= List of the Cenozoic life of Florida =

This list of the Cenozoic life of Florida contains the various prehistoric life-forms whose fossilized remains have been reported from within the US state of Florida during the Cenozoic Era, between 66 million and 10,000 years ago.

== A ==
- †Abderospira
  - †Abderospira funiakensis – type locality for species
- †Abelmoschomys
  - †Abelmoschomys simpsoni – type locality for species
- Abertella
- †Abra
  - †Abra aequalis
  - †Abra cylicion – type locality for species
  - †Abra lapochi – type locality for species
  - †Abra subreflexa
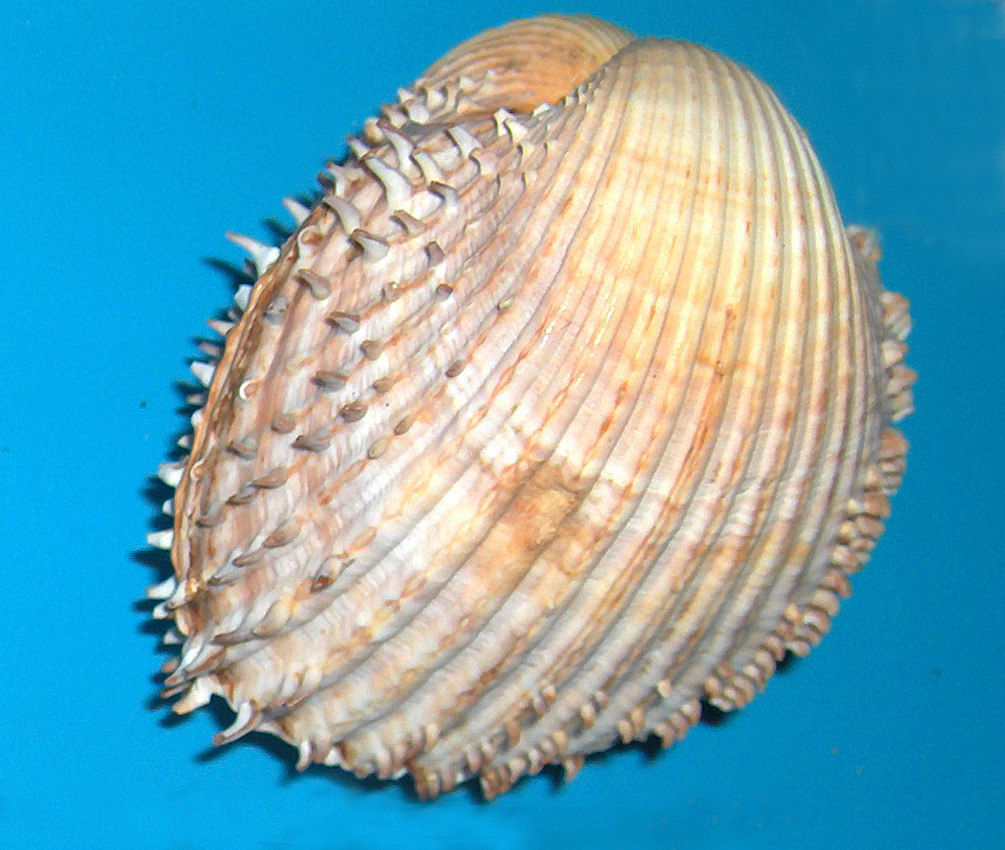
- Shell of an Acanthocardia cockle
  Acanthocardia
  - †Acanthocardia acrocome
  - †Acanthocardia claibornense – or unidentified comparable form
  - †Acanthocardia ctenolium
  - †Acanthocardia propeciliare
  - †Acanthocardia spinosifrons – type locality for species
- Acanthochitona
  - †Acanthochitona pygmaea
- †Acantholabia
  - †Acantholabia floridana
  - †Acantholabia sarasotaensis
- Acar
  - †Acar domingensis
  - †Acar retciulata
- Accipiter
  - †Accipiter cooperii
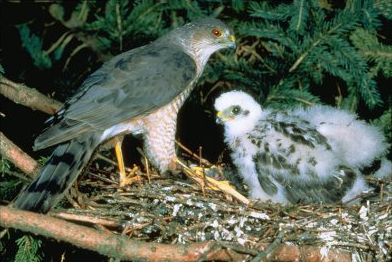
  - Living adult (center) and chick (lower right) Accipiter striatus, or sharp-shinned hawks
    †Accipiter striatus
- Acer
  - †Acer rubrum
- †Acheronictis
  - †Acheronictis webbi – type locality for species
- †Acmaturris
  - †Acmaturris metria
- Acorylus
  - †Acorylus gouldii
- Acris
  - †Acris gryllus – or unidentified comparable form
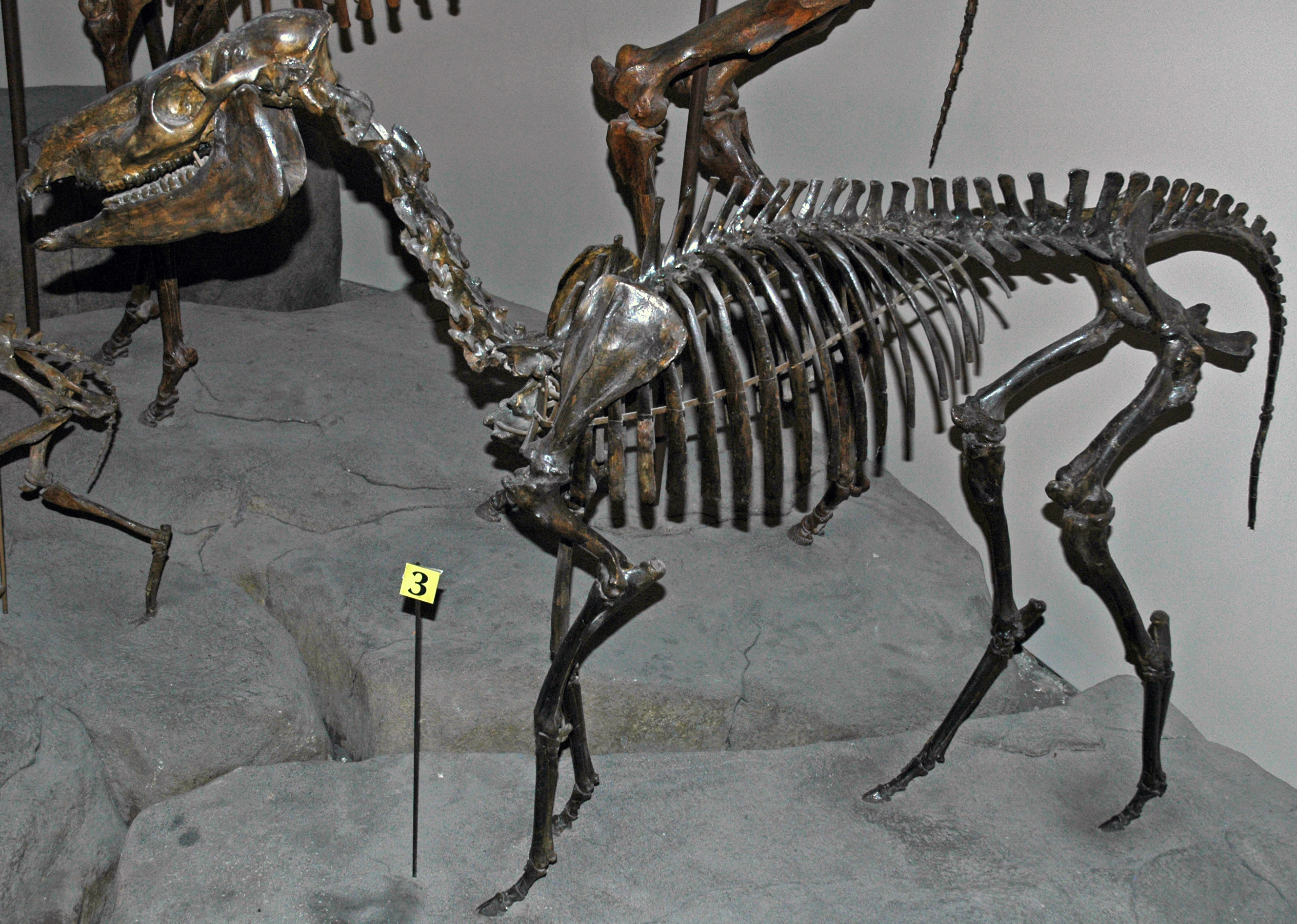
- Mounted fossilized skeleton of the Miocene horse Acritohippus
  †Acritohippus
  - †Acritohippus isonesus
- Acropora
  - †Acropora cervicornis
  - †Acropora palmata
  - †Acropora panamensis
  - †Acropora tampaensis – type locality for species
- Acrosterigma
  - †Acrosterigma declive
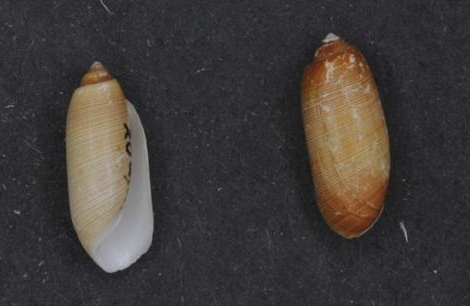
- Shells of Acteocina barrel-bubble sea snails
  Acteocina
  - †Acteocina canaliculata
  - †Acteocina candei
  - †Acteocina fischeri
  - †Acteocina incisula
  - †Acteocina persimilis
  - †Acteocina rusa – type locality for species
  - †Acteocina sphalera – type locality for species
  - †Acteocina squarrosa
  - †Acteocina wetherilli
- Acteon
  - †Acteon chipolanus
  - †Acteon hamadryados
  - †Acteon korphys – type locality for species
  - †Acteon luculi
  - †Acteon tampae
  - †Acteon textilis
  - †Acteon vaughani
- Actinocythereis
  - †Actinocythereis exanthemata
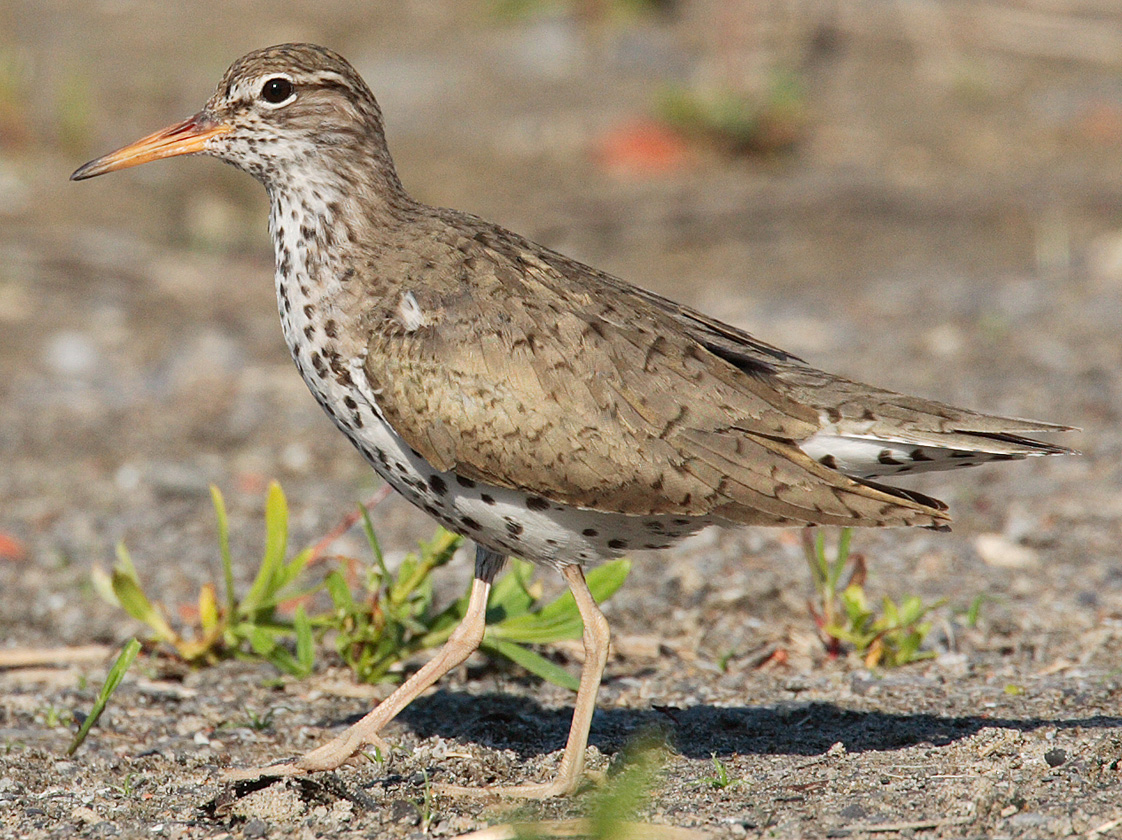
- A living Actitis macularius, or spotted sandpiper
  Actitis
  - †Actitis macularia
- †Acuticythereis
  - †Acuticythereis laevissima
- Adeonellopsis
  - †Adeonellopsis galeata
- Aegolius
  - †Aegolius acadicus
- †Aelurodon
  - †Aelurodon taxoides
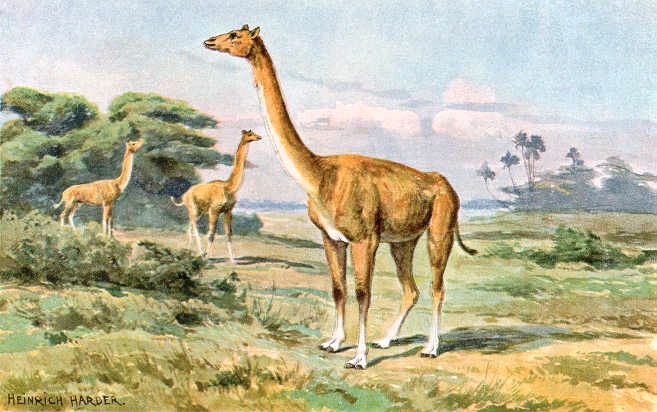
- Life restoration of the Miocene camel Aepycamelus, or the long-necked camel. Heinrich Harder (1920).
  †Aepycamelus
  - †Aepycamelus major
- Aequipecten
  - †Aequipecten camperilis
  - †Aequipecten camperis
  - †Aequipecten comparilis
  - †Aequipecten eboreus
  - †Aequipecten fuscopurpureus
  - †Aequipecten spillmani
  - †Aequipecten suwaneensis
- Aesopus
  - †Aesopus proctorae
- Aetobatus
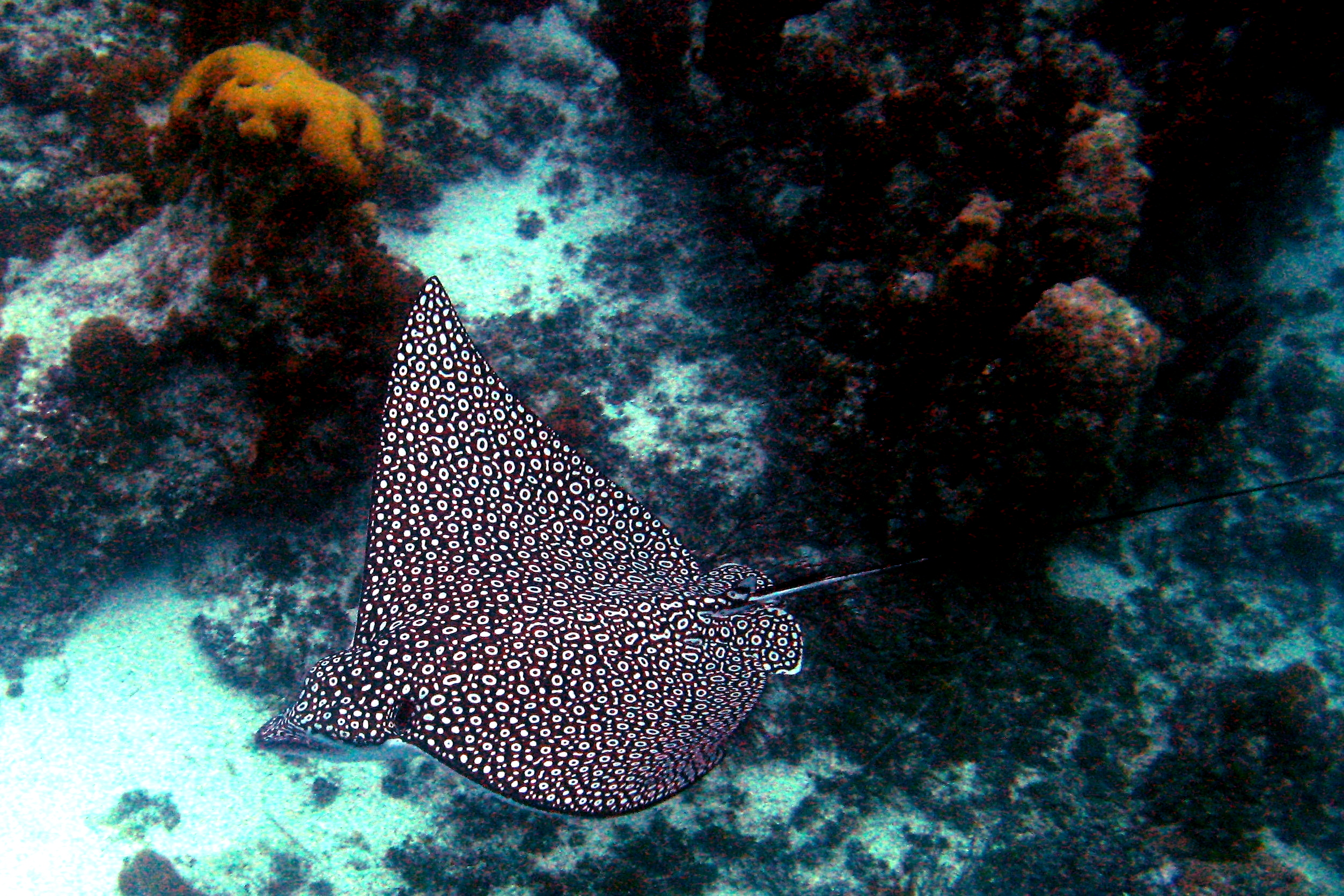
  - A living Aetobatus narinari, or spotted eagle ray
    †Aetobatus narinari
- Agaricia
  - †Agaricia agaricites
  - †Agaricia dominicensis
- Agaronia
  - †Agaronia inglisia – type locality for species
- Agassizia
  - †Agassizia clevei
  - †Agassizia floridana
  - †Agassizia porifera
- Agathistoma
  - †Agathistoma fasciatum
- Agatrix
- Agelaius
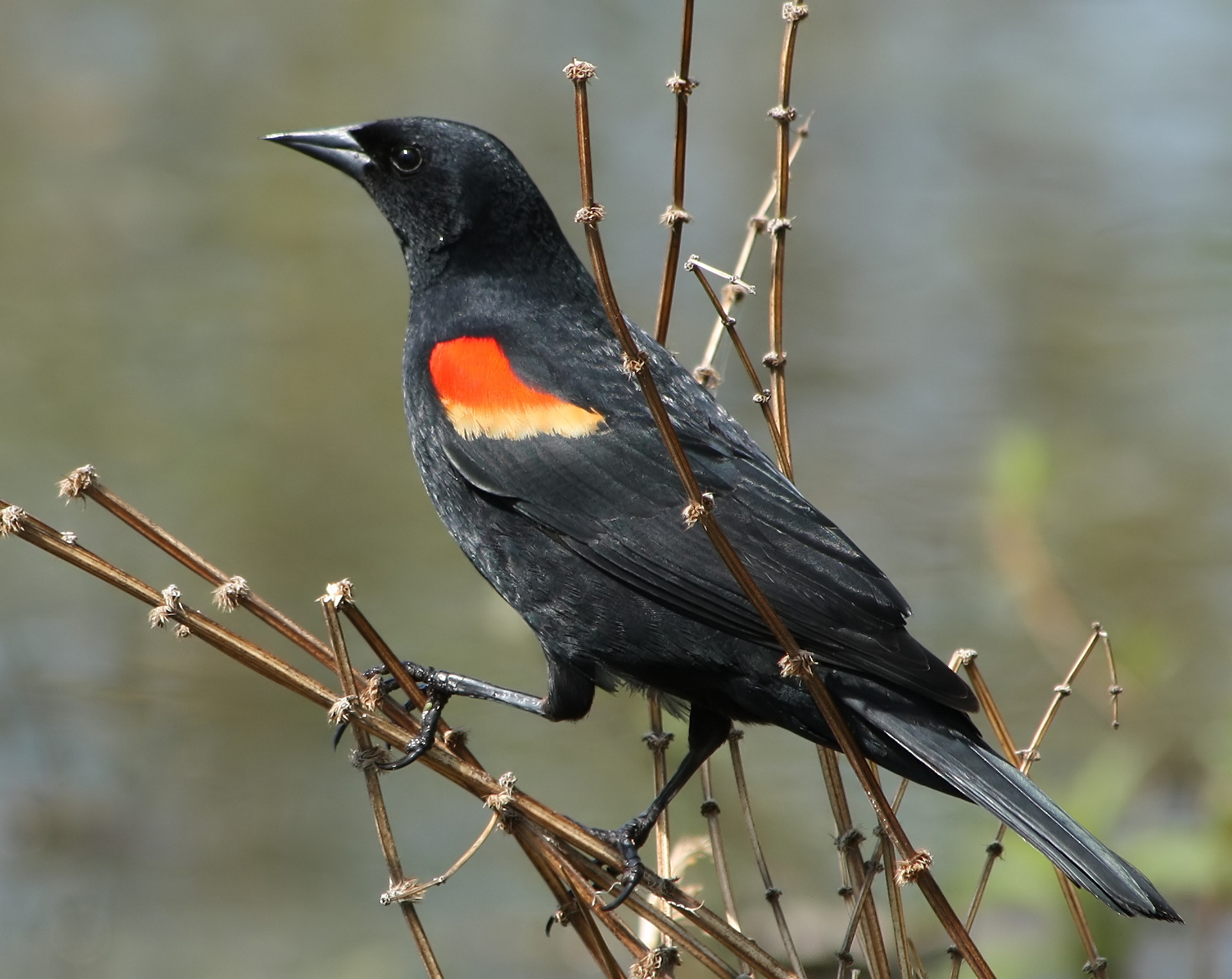
  - A living Agelaius phoeniceus, or red-winged blackbird
    †Agelaius phoeniceus
- Agkistrodon
  - †Agkistrodon piscivorus
- Agladrillia
  - †Agladrillia agla – type locality for species
  - †Agladrillia dodona – type locality for species
  - †Agladrillia rabdotacoma
  - †Agladrillia rabdotacona – type locality for species
  - †Agladrillia rabdotocona
- †Agnotocastor
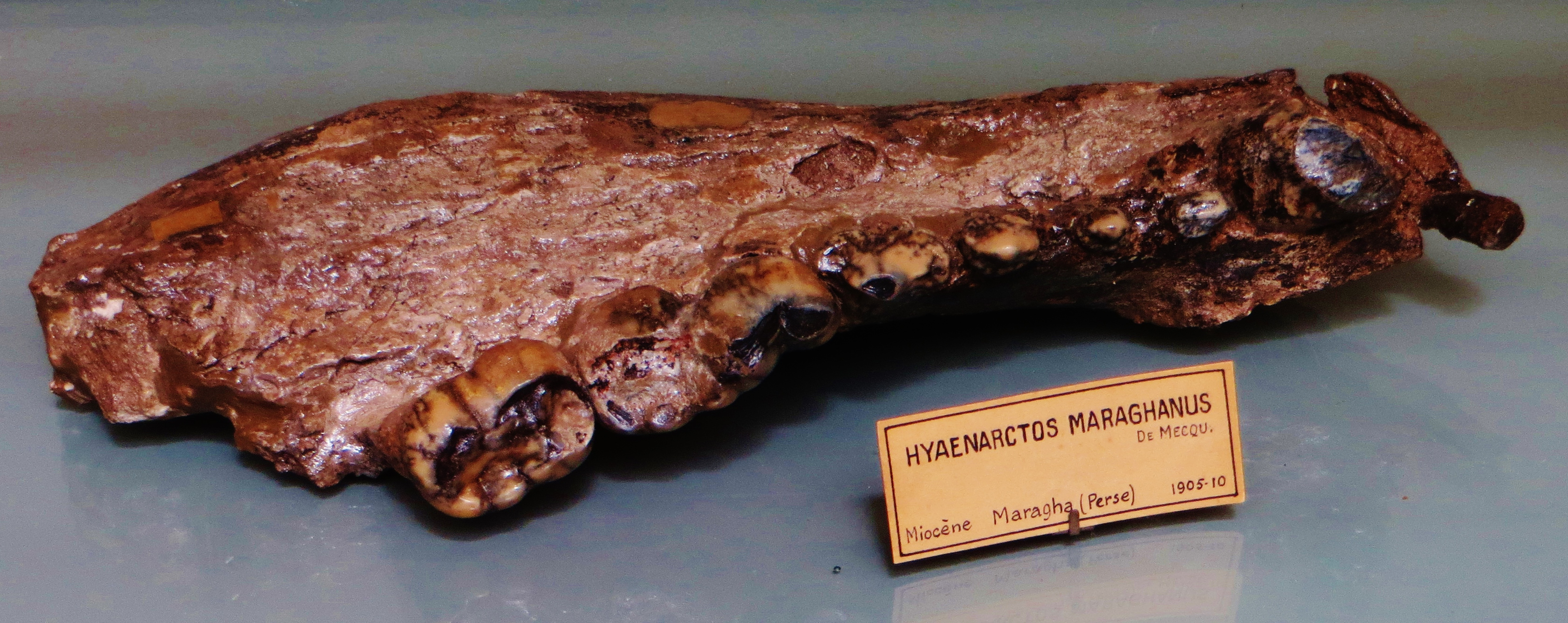
- Fossilized mandible of the Miocene-Pleistocene bear Agriotherium
  †Agriotherium
  - †Agriotherium schneideri – type locality for species
- Aix
  - †Aix sponsa
- †Aizengyps
  - †Aizengyps toomeyae – type locality for species
- Ajaia
  - †Ajaia ajaja
  - †Ajaia chione – type locality for species
- †Akleistostoma
  - †Akleistostoma bairdi
  - †Akleistostoma carolinensis
  - †Akleistostoma crocodila
  - †Akleistostoma diegelae
  - †Akleistostoma erici
  - †Akleistostoma floridana
  - †Akleistostoma hughesi
  - †Akleistostoma jenniferae
  - †Akleistostoma macbrideae
  - †Akleistostoma pilsbryi
  - †Akleistostoma rilkoi
  - †Akleistostoma transitoria
- Alaba
  - †Alaba chipolana
  - †Alaba dodona – type locality for species
- Alabina
  - †Alabina boiplex
  - †Alabina turbatrix
- †Albertella
  - †Albertella alberti
  - †Albertella floridana
- Alca – type locality for genus
  - †Alca grandis – type locality for species
- Alderina
  - †Alderina pulcherrima
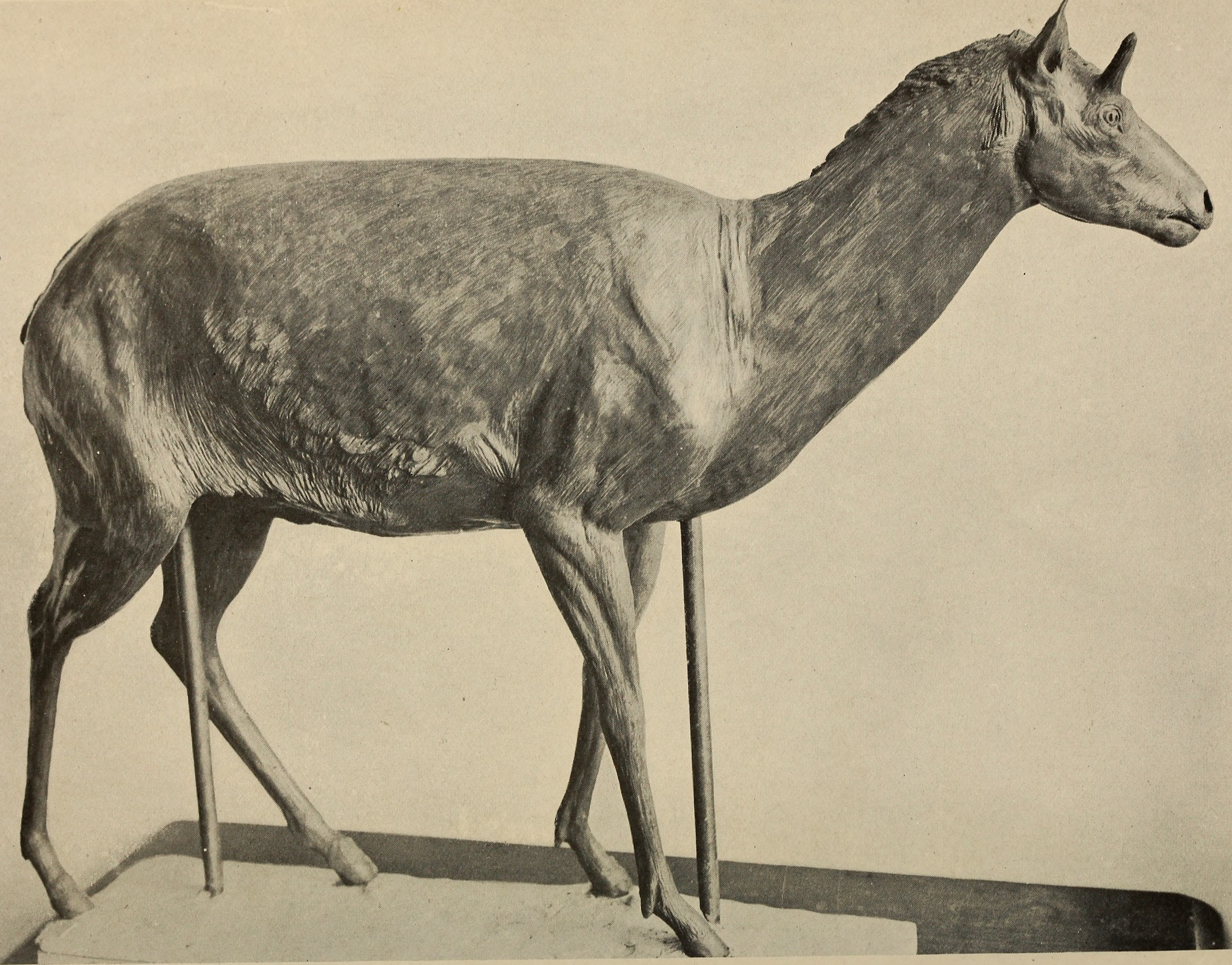
- Restorative model of the Miocene deer relative Aletomeryx
  †Aletomeryx
  - †Aletomeryx gracilis – or unidentified comparable form
- Aligena
  - †Aligena lineata
  - †Aligena pustulosa
- Alligator
  - †Alligator mississipiensis
  - †Alligator mississippiensis
  - †Alligator olseni – type locality for species
- Alnus
- Alosa
- †Alveinus
  - †Alveinus rotundus – type locality for species
- Alveopora
  - †Alveopora tampae – type locality for species
- Amauropsis – report made of unidentified related form or using admittedly obsolete nomenclature
  - †Amauropsis burnsii – or unidentified related form
- †Amblypygus
  - †Amblypygus americanus
- †Ambystoma
  - †Ambystoma tigrinum
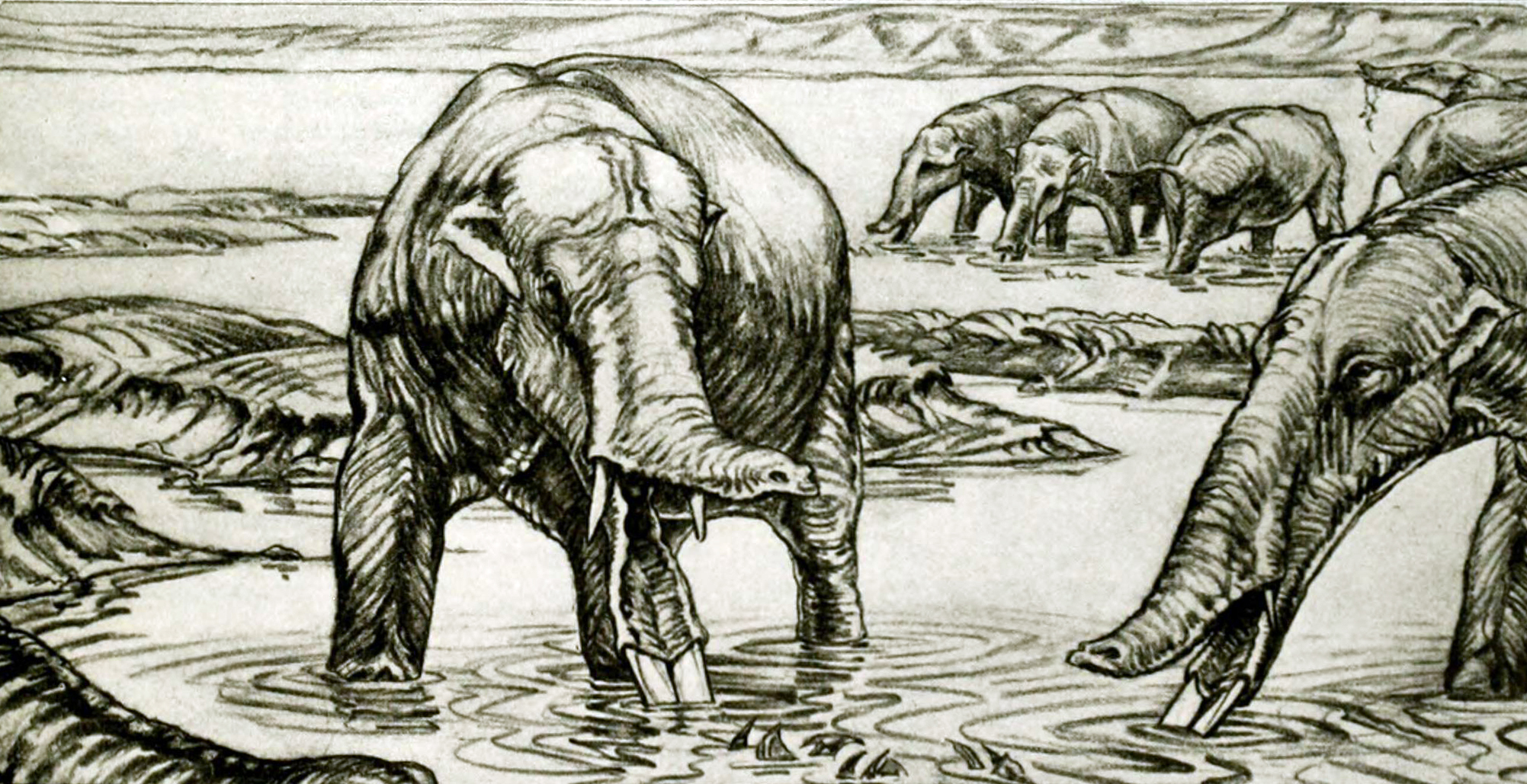
- Life restoration of the Miocene elephant relative Amebelodon. Margret Flinsch (1932).
  †Amebelodon
  - †Amebelodon britti
  - †Amebelodon floridanus
- Americardia
  - †Americardia avona
  - †Americardia avonum – type locality for species
  - †Americardia burnsii
  - †Americardia media
  - †Americardia protoalicula
  - †Americardia protoaliculum – type locality for species
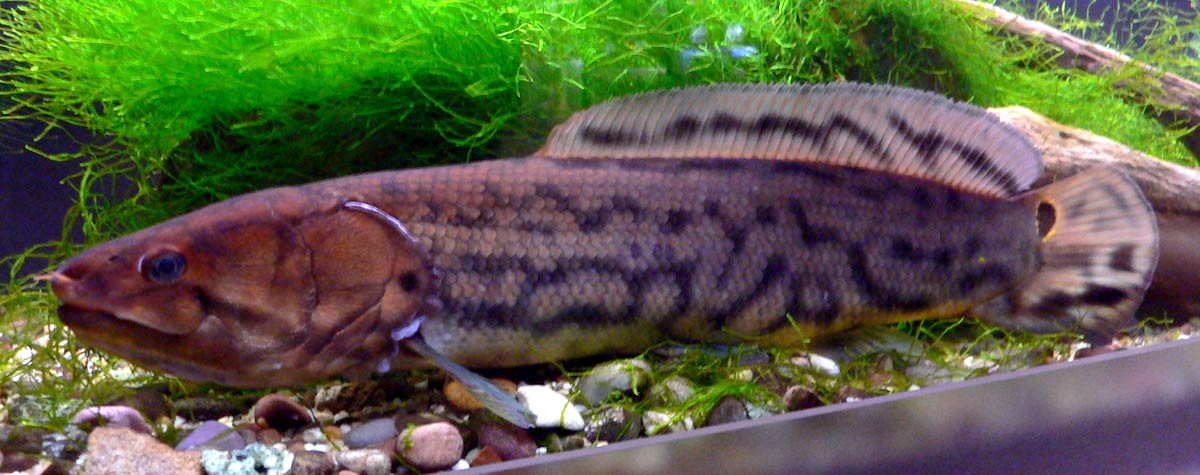
- A living Amia, or bowfin
  Amia
  - †Amia calva
- †Amiatus
  - †Amiatus calvus
- Ammodramus
  - †Ammodramus maritimus
  - †Ammodramus savannarum
- Amnicola
  - †Amnicola adesta
  - †Amnicola floridana – or unidentified related form
- †Amphicyon
  - †Amphicyon longiramus – type locality for species
  - †Amphicyon pontoni – type locality for species
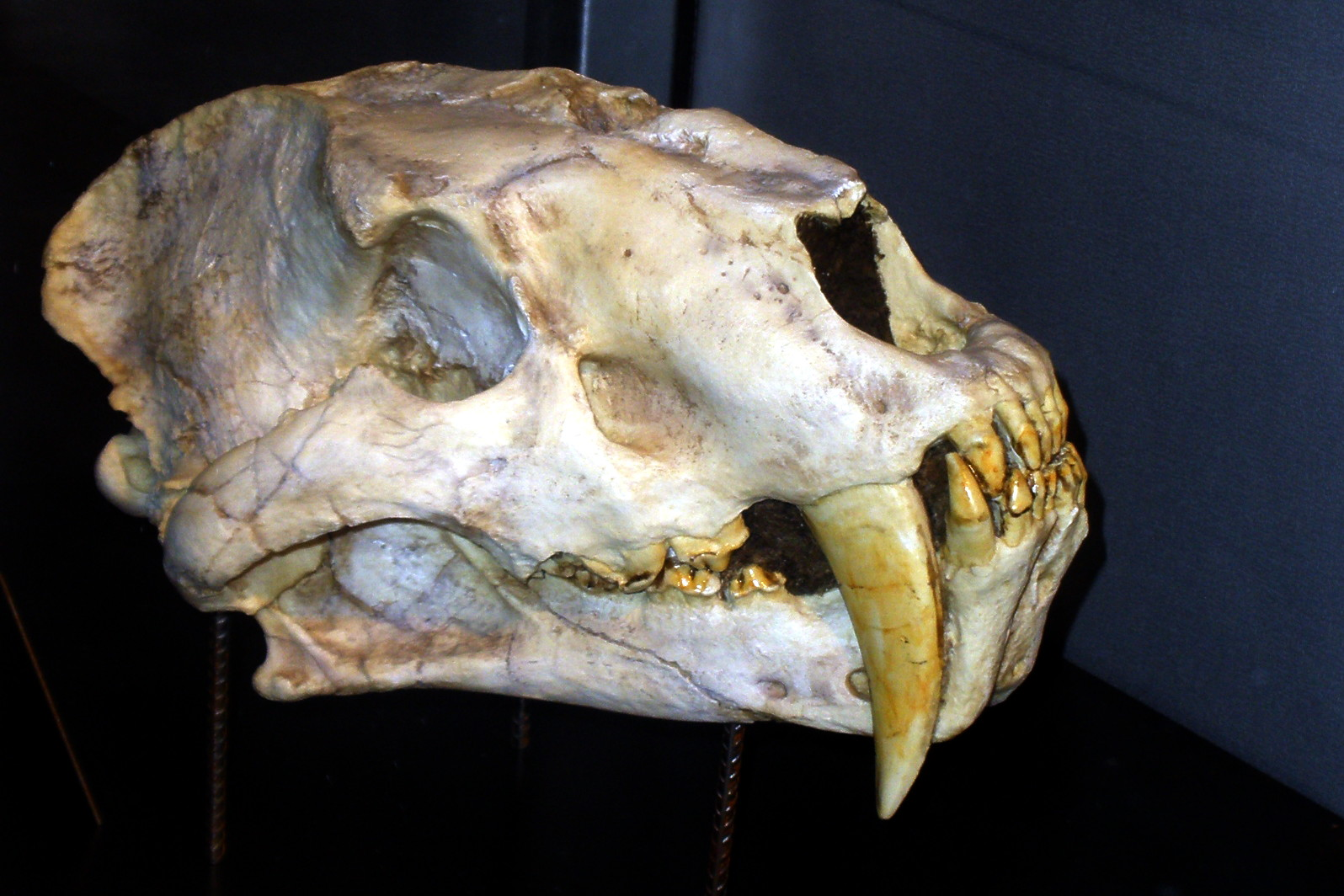
- Fossilized skull of the Miocene saber-toothed cat Amphimachairodus
  †Amphimachairodus
  - †Amphimachairodus coloradensis – or unidentified comparable form
- †Amphiroa
  - †Amphiroa americana
- Amphisorus
- Amphistegina
  - †Amphistegina lessonii
- †Amphisterigina
  - †Amphisterigina lessoni – or unidentified comparable form
- Amphiuma
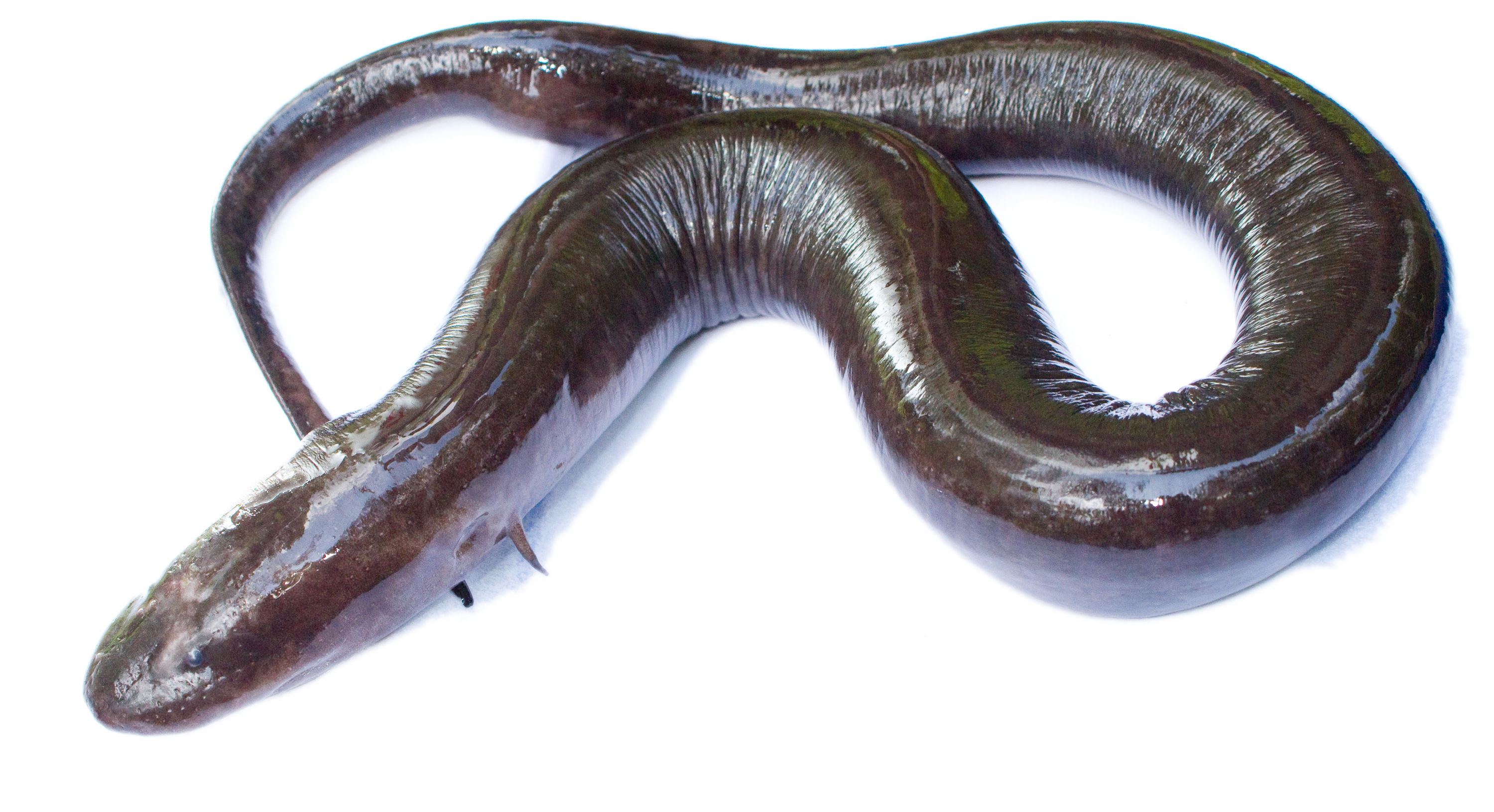
  - A living Amphiuma means, or two-toed amphiuma
    †Amphiuma means
- †Amplibuteo
  - †Amplibuteo concordatus – type locality for species
  - †Amplibuteo woodwardi
- †Ampullina
  - †Ampullina flintensis
- †Ampullinopsis
  - †Ampullinopsis amphora
  - †Ampullinopsis citrinensis – type locality for species
  - †Ampullinopsis flintensis
- Amusium
  - †Amusium mertoni
  - †Amusium mortoni
  - †Amusium ocalanum
  - †Amusium precursor
- †Anabernicula
  - †Anabernicula gracilenta
  - †Anabernicula minuscula – or unidentified comparable form
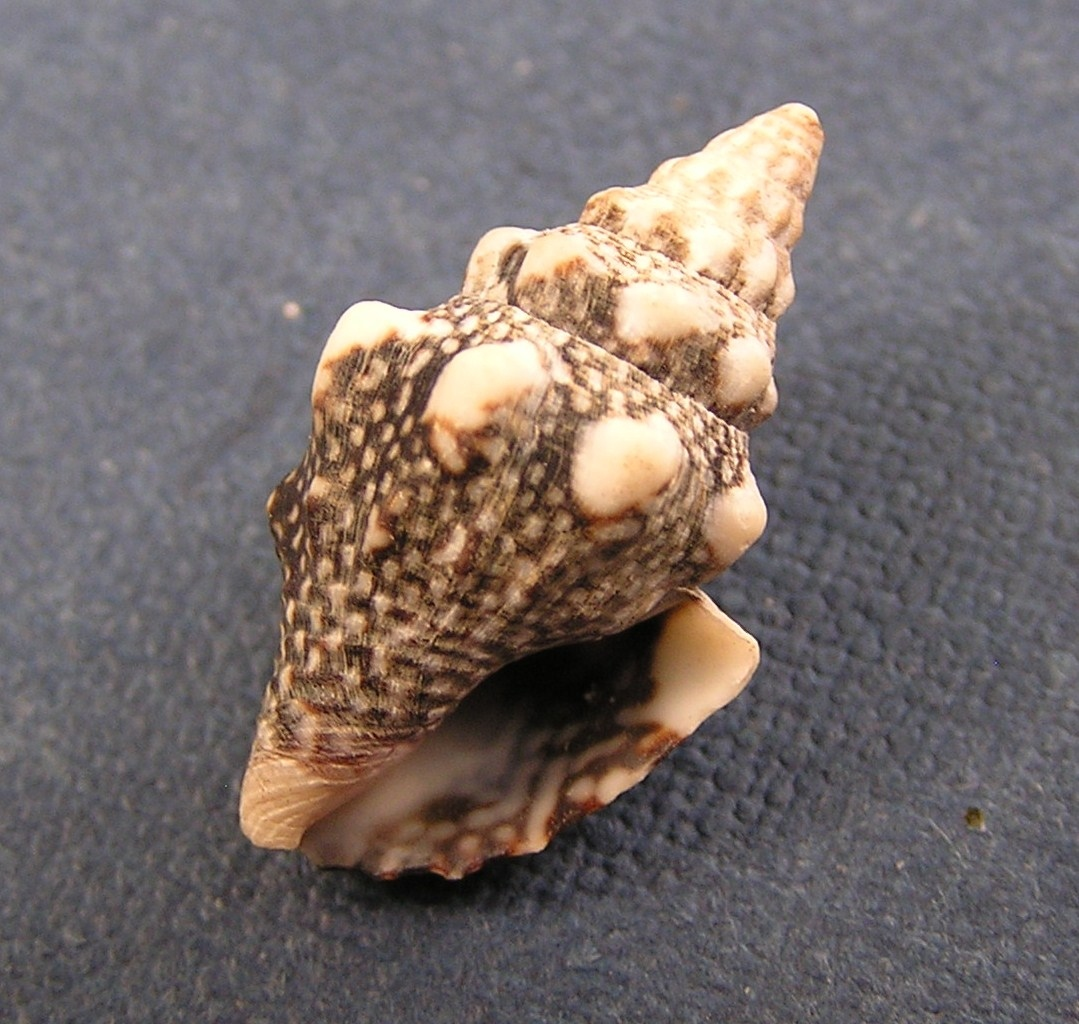
- Shell of an Anachis dove sea snail
  Anachis
  - †Anachis avara
  - †Anachis caloosaensis
  - †Anachis camax
  - †Anachis chariessa
  - †Anachis clavatula
  - †Anachis dappi
  - †Anachis eutheria
  - †Anachis obesus
  - †Anachis wieserae
- Anadara
  - †Anadara acompsa
  - †Anadara aequalis
  - †Anadara aequalitas
  - †Anadara aequlitas
  - †Anadara aresta
  - †Anadara callicestosa
  - †Anadara campsa
  - †Anadara campyla
  - †Anadara cardioides – type locality for species
  - †Anadara castarca
  - †Anadara catasarca
  - †Anadara crassicosta
  - †Anadara delandensis – or unidentified comparable form
  - †Anadara dodona
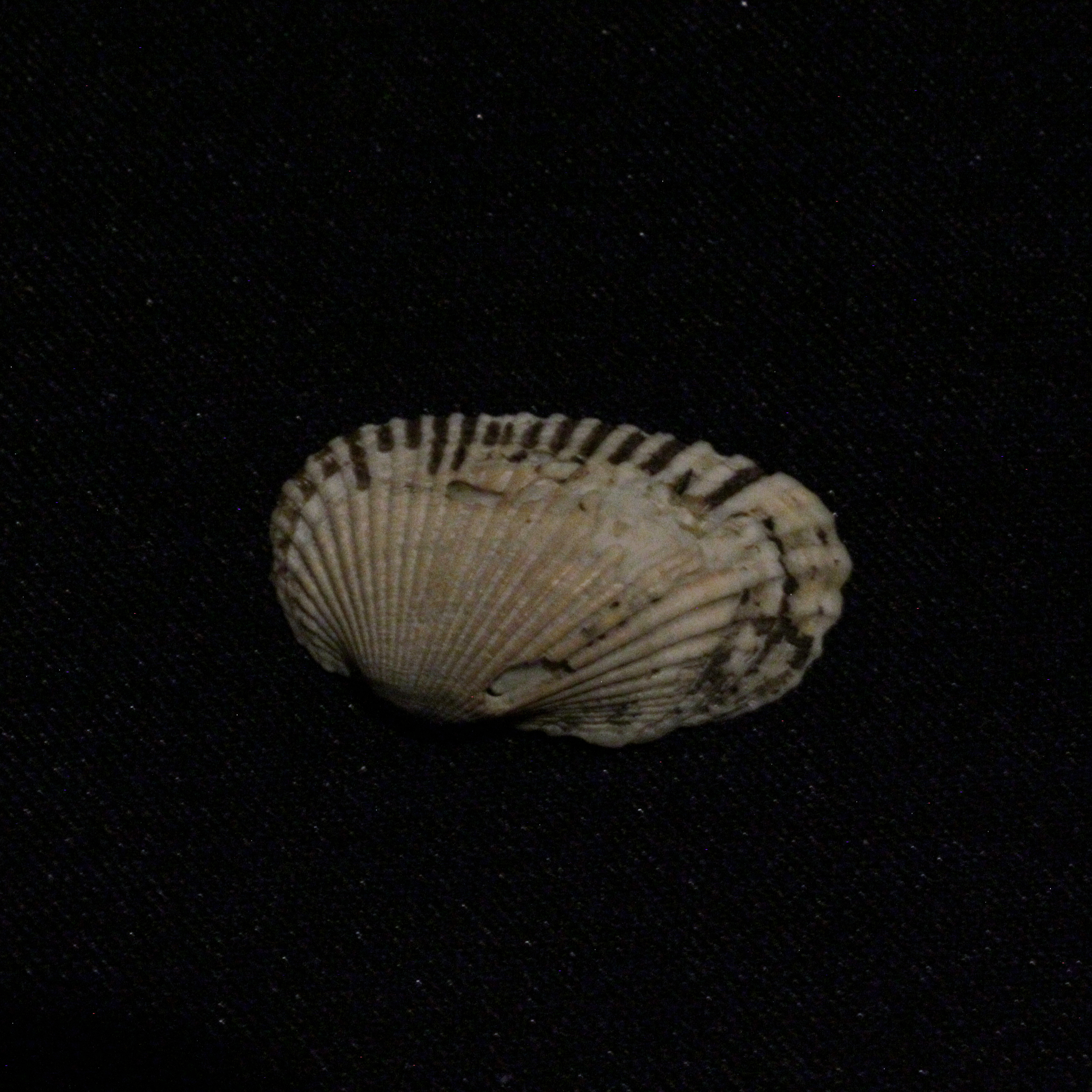
  - Shell of an Anadara floridana, or cut-ribbed ark clam
    †Anadara floridana
  - †Anadara gunteri
  - †Anadara hoerleae
  - †Anadara hypomela
  - †Anadara improcera
  - †Anadara incongrus
  - †Anadara initiator
  - †Anadara latidentata
  - †Anadara lienosa
  - †Anadara lineolata
  - †Anadara macneili – type locality for species
  - †Anadara megerata
  - †Anadara metastrebla
  - †Anadara mikkula – type locality for species
  - †Anadara mummi – type locality for species
  - †Anadara notoflorida – type locality for species
  - †Anadara ovalis
  - †Anadara petersburgensis
  - †Anadara propearesta
  - †Anadara rubisiniana
  - †Anadara rustica
  - †Anadara santarosana – type locality for species
  - †Anadara scalarina
  - †Anadara scalaris
  - †Anadara sellardsi
  - †Anadara staminata
  - †Anadara strebla
  - †Anadara tarponensis
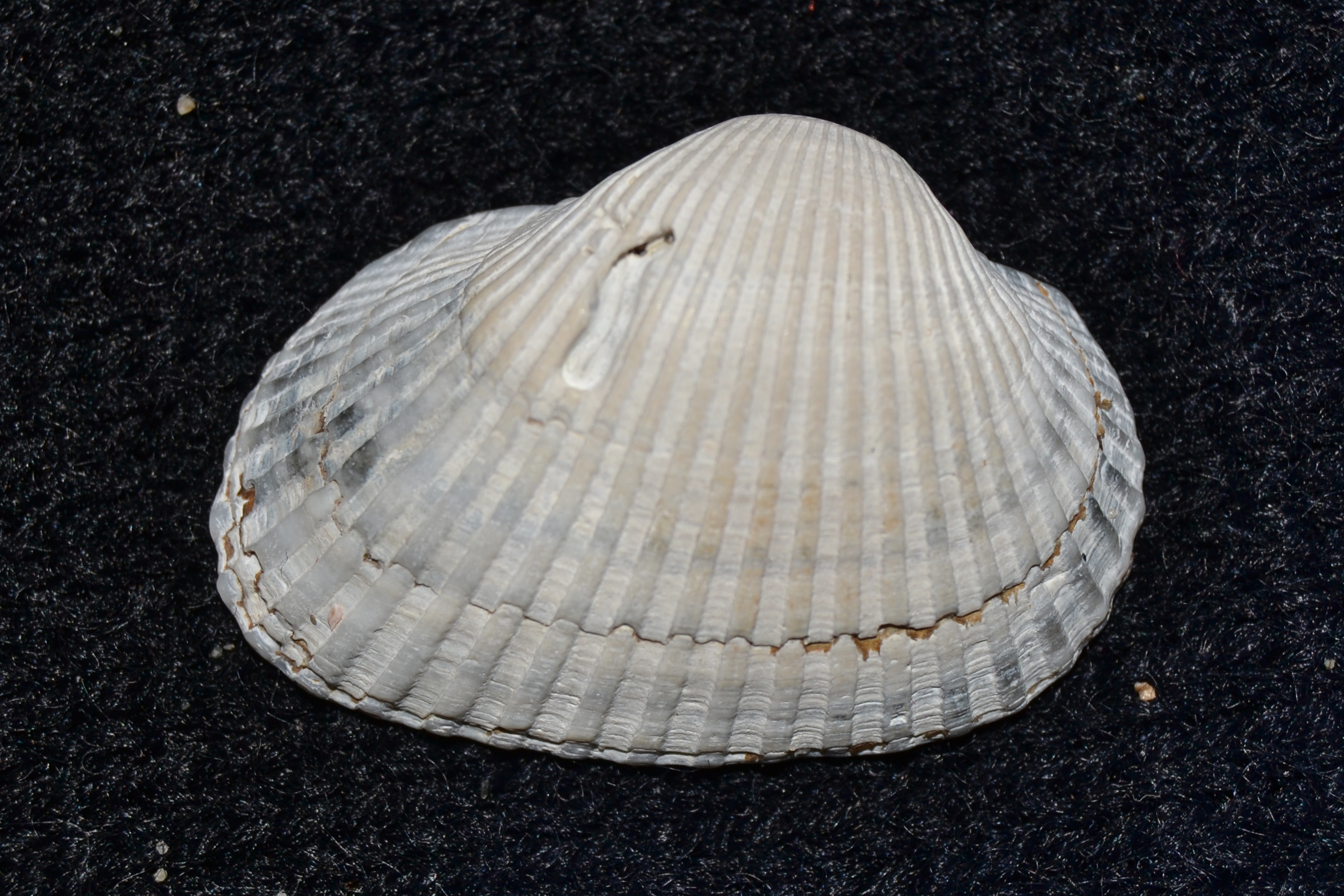
  - Shell of an Anadara transversa, or transverse ark clam
    †Anadara transversa
  - †Anadara trapezia
  - †Anadara tuberculosa
  - †Anadara waltonia – type locality for species
- Anas
  - †Anas acuta
  - †Anas americana
  - †Anas carolinensis
  - †Anas clypeata
  - †Anas crecca
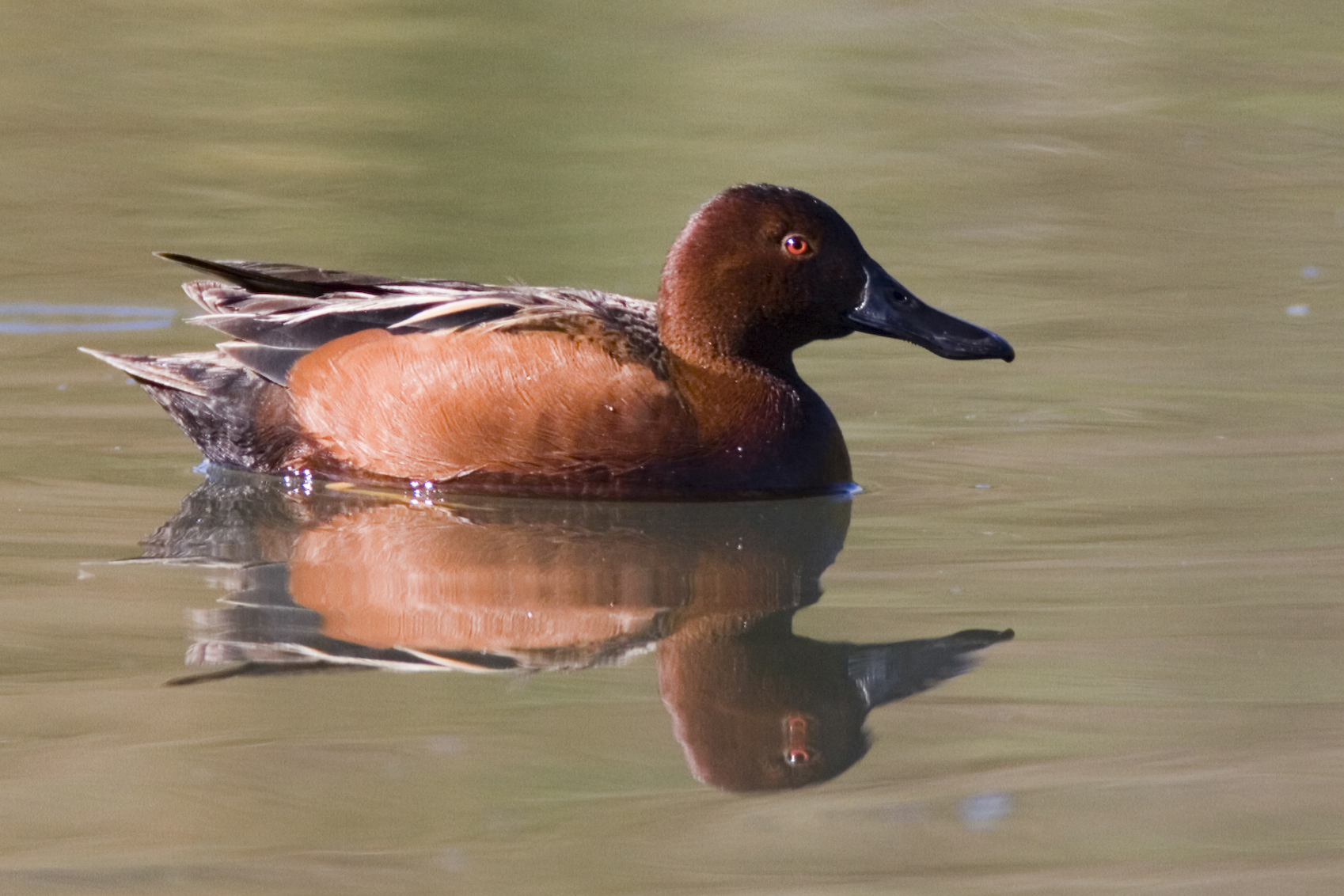
  - A living Spatula cyanoptera, or cinnamon teal
    †Anas cyanoptera – or unidentified comparable form
  - †Anas discors
  - †Anas fulvigula
  - †Anas itchtucknee – type locality for species
  - †Anas platyrhynchos
  - †Anas rubripes
  - †Anas strepera
- Anatina
  - †Anatina anatina
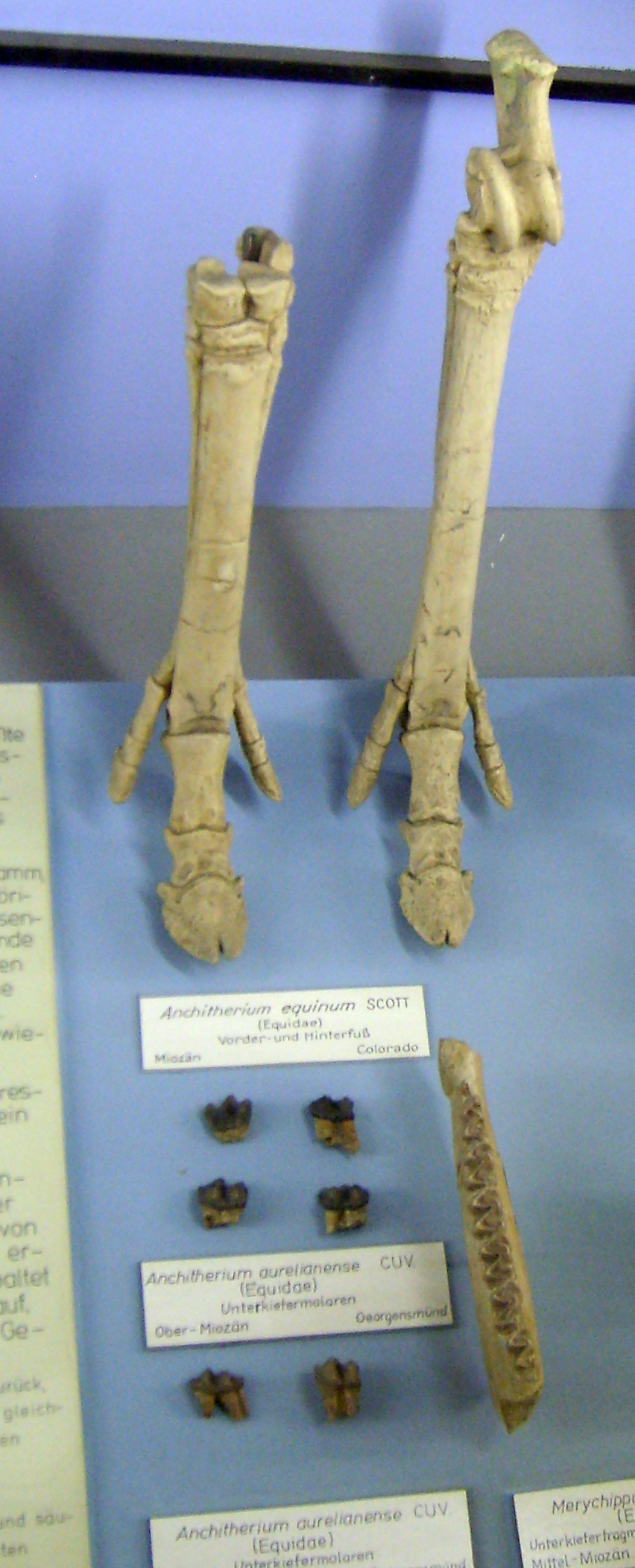
- Fossilized limb bones, and teeth of the Miocene three-toed horse Anchitherium (left)
  †Anchitherium
  - †Anchitherium clarencei – type locality for species
- Ancilla
  - †Ancilla chipolana
  - †Ancilla shepardi
- Angulogerina
  - †Angulogerina occidentalis
- Angulus
  - †Angulus agilis – or unidentified comparable form
  - †Angulus merus – or unidentified comparable form
  - †Angulus texanus
  - †Angulus versicolor
- Anhinga
  - †Anhinga anhinga
  - †Anhinga grandis
  - †Anhinga subvolans – type locality for species
- †Anilioides – type locality for genus
  - †Anilioides minuatus – type locality for species
- †Anisaster
  - †Anisaster mossomi
- Anisodonta
  - †Anisodonta americana
- Anodonta
- Anodontia
  - †Anodontia alba
  - †Anodontia janus
  - †Anodontia santarosana
  - †Anodontia schrammi
- Anolis
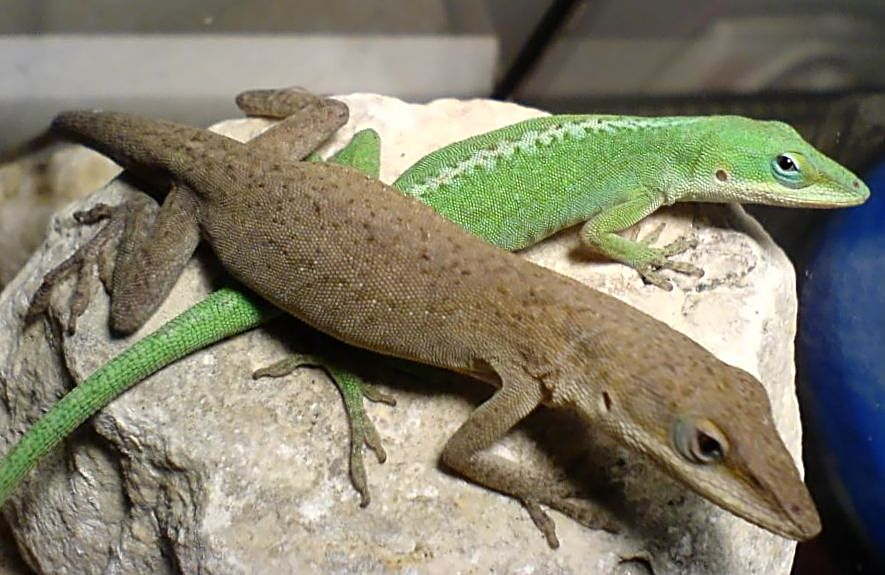
  - Living male (on top) and female (bottom, with white stripe down her back) Anolis carolinensis, or Carolina anoles
    †Anolis carolinensis
  - †Anolis morphotype A informal
  - †Anolis morphotype B informal
- Anomalocardia
  - †Anomalocardia aubreyana
  - †Anomalocardia brasiliana
  - †Anomalocardia callosa
  - †Anomalocardia caloosana
  - †Anomalocardia chipolana
  - †Anomalocardia concinna
  - †Anomalocardia cuneimeris
  - †Anomalocardia hendryana
  - †Anomalocardia penita
- Anomia
  - †Anomia floridana
  - †Anomia floridiana
  - †Anomia glypta – type locality for species
  - †Anomia lisbonensis
  - †Anomia microgrammata
  - †Anomia simplex
  - †Anomia suwaneensis
- Anona
  - †Anona glabra
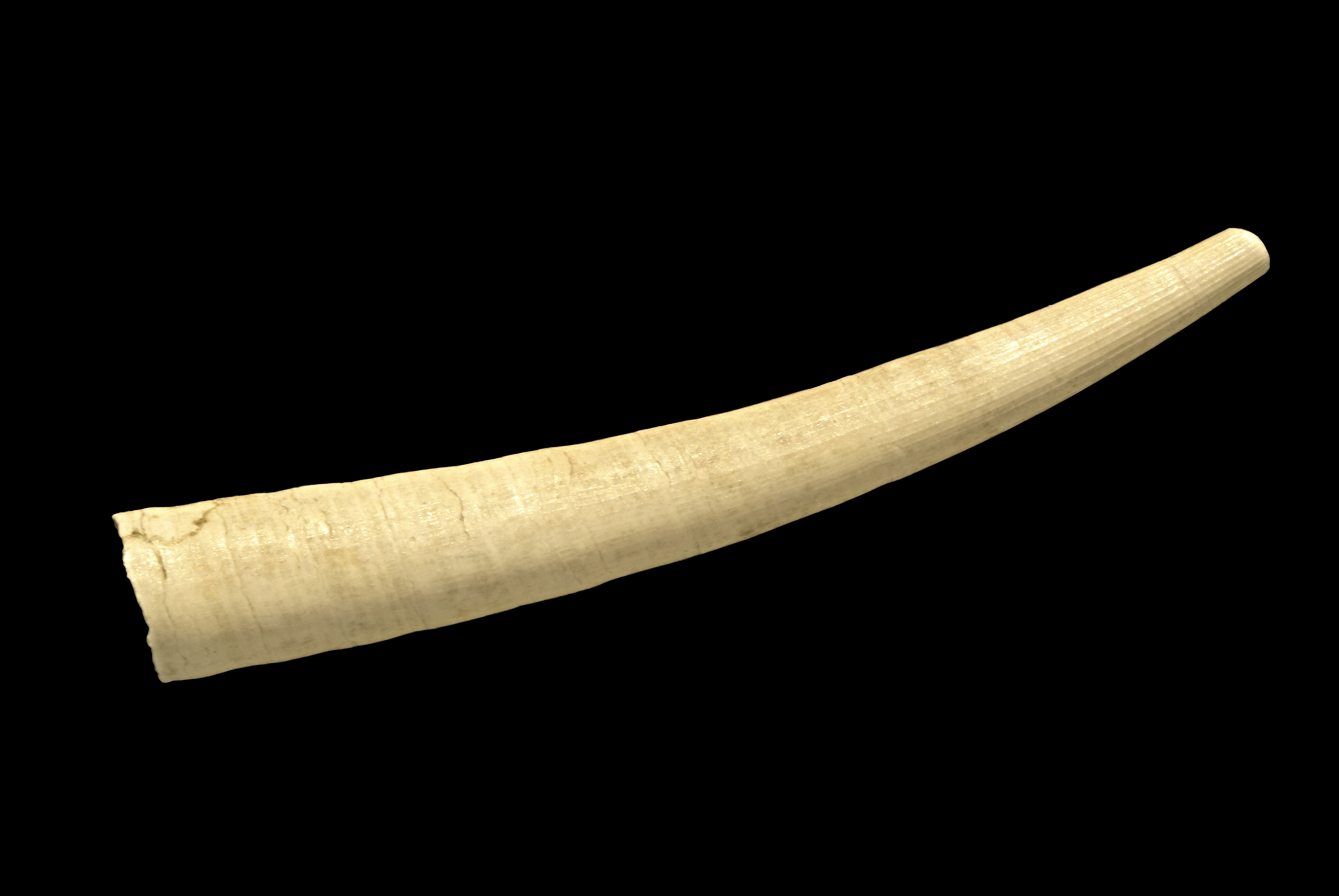
- A shell of an Antalis tusk shell
  Antalis
  - †Antalis ceratum
  - †Antalis chipolanum – type locality for species
  - †Antalis diopon – type locality for species
- Anthemiphyllia – tentative report
- Anticlimax
  - †Anticlimax annae
  - †Anticlimax calligypta
  - †Anticlimax locklini
  - †Anticlimax pilsbryi
  - †Anticlimax tholus
- Antigona
  - †Antigona listeri
- †Antiguastrea
  - †Antiguastrea cellulosa
  - †Antiguastrea silicensis
- Antillipecten
  - †Antillipecten alumensis
  - †Antillipecten anguillensis
  - †Antillipecten antillarum
  - †Antillipecten cercadicus
  - †Antillipecten flintensis
- †Antillocyathus – tentative report
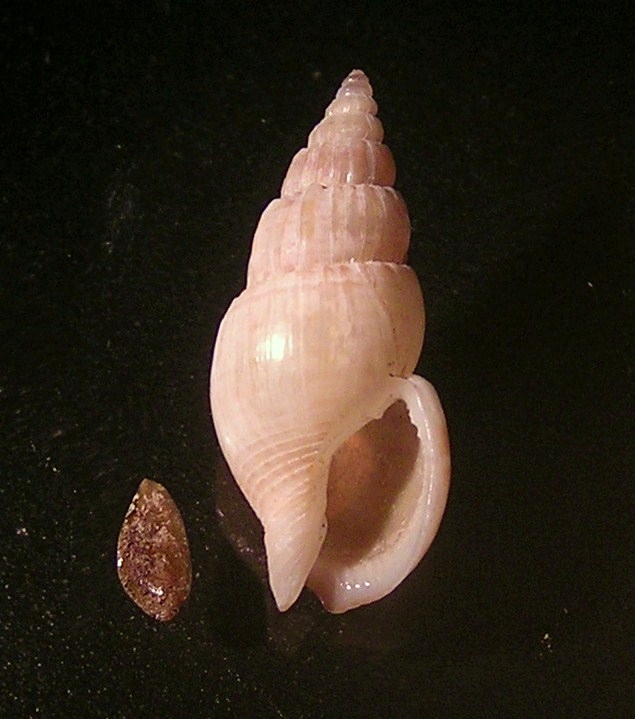
- Shell of an Antillophos nassa mud snail
  Antillophos
  - †Antillophos candeanus – or unidentified comparable form
  - †Antillophos dictyola – type locality for species
- †Antillophyllia
  - †Antillophyllia chipolana – type locality for species
- Antropora
  - †Antropora minuta
  - †Antropora octonaria
  - †Antropora pyriformis
- Antrozous
- Aorotrema
  - †Aorotrema cistronium
  - †Aorotrema pontogenes
- Apalone
  - †Apalone ferox
- Aphelocoma
  - †Aphelocoma coerulescens
- †Aphelops
  - †Aphelops malacorhinus
  - †Aphelops mutilus
- Aphera
  - †Aphera waltonensis
- †Apicula
  - †Apicula apicalis
  - †Apicula bowenae
  - †Apicula buckinghamensis
  - †Apicula gladeensis
- Aquila
  - †Aquila bivia – type locality for species
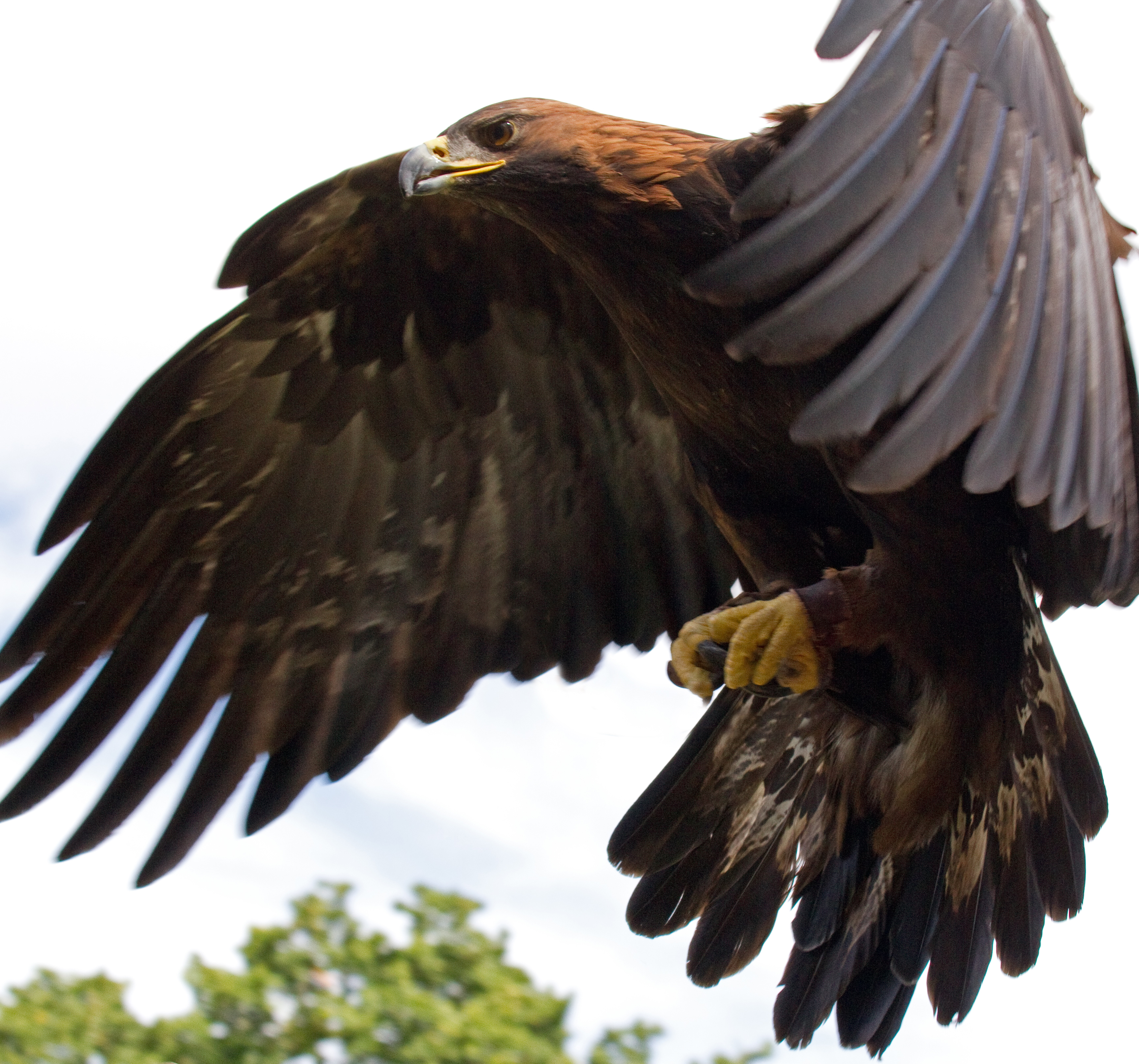
  - A living Aquila chrysaetos, or golden eagle
    †Aquila chrysaetos
- Aquitanobursa – tentative report
  - †Aquitanobursa chipolana – type locality for species. Formerly classified as Bursa chipolana. May warrant creation of new genus altogether.
- †Araloselachus
  - †Araloselachus cuspidata
- †Aramides
  - †Aramides cajanea
- †Aramiltha
  - †Aramiltha disciformis – or unidentified related form
- Aramus
  - †Aramus guarauna
  - †Aramus pictus
- Arbacia
  - †Arbacia crenulata
- Arca
  - †Arca aquila
  - †Arca grammatodonta
  - †Arca imbricata
  - †Arca kendrickensis
  - †Arca latidentata
  - †Arca limula
  - †Arca mikkula
  - †Arca occidentalis
  - †Arca paratina
  - †Arca staminata
  - †Arca umbonata
  - †Arca wagneriana
  - †Arca williamsoni
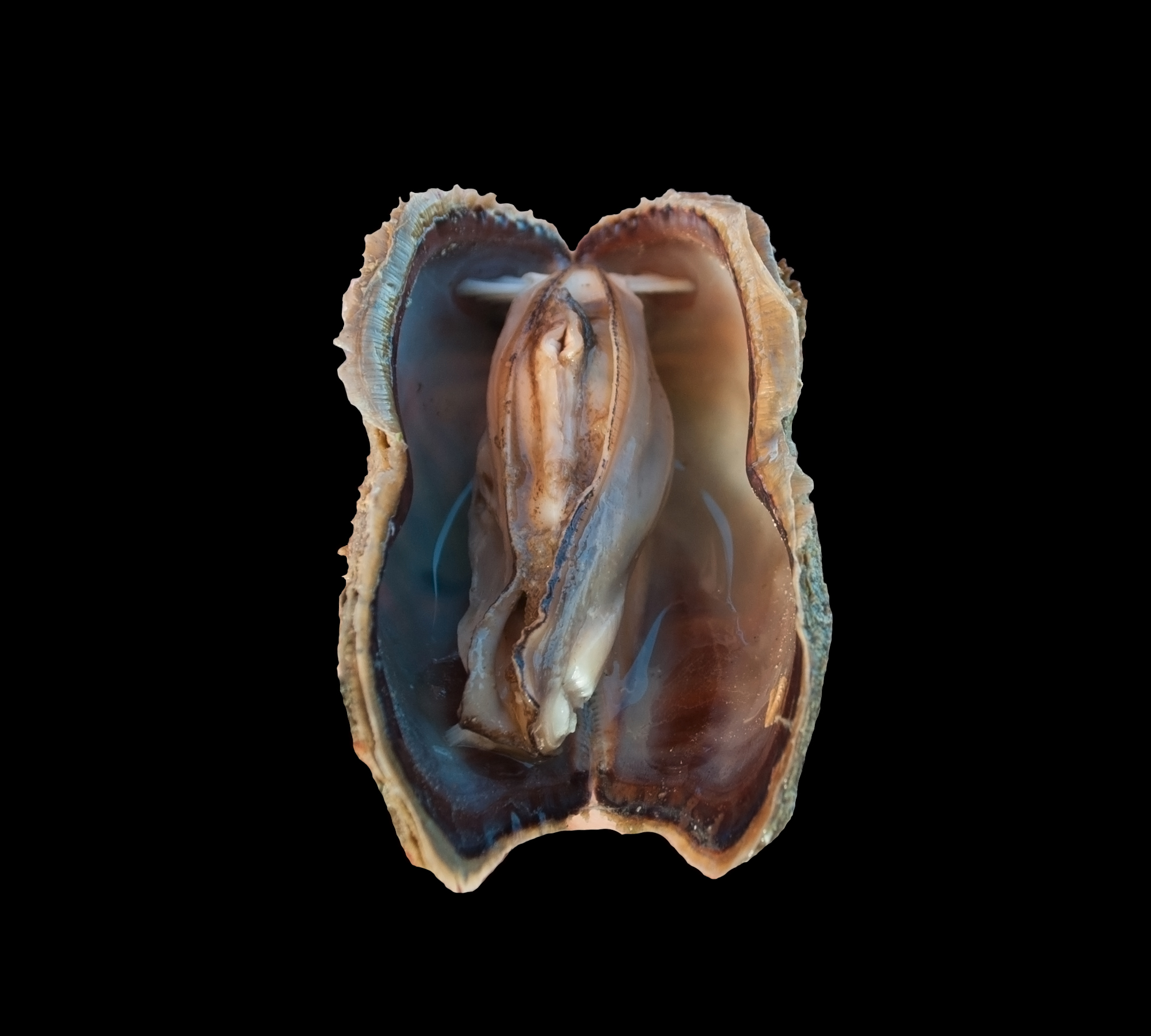
  - Interior of the shell of an Arca zebra, or turkey wing ark clam
    †Arca zebra
- †Archaeohippus
  - †Archaeohippus blackbergi
  - †Archaeohippus mannulus – type locality for species
- †Archaeolagus
- Archaeolithothamnium
  - †Archaeolithothamnium dalloni
  - †Archaeolithothamnium floridanum
  - †Archaeolithothamnium gunteri
  - †Archaeolithothamnium parisiense
- Archaias
- †Archimediella
  - †Archimediella duplinensis
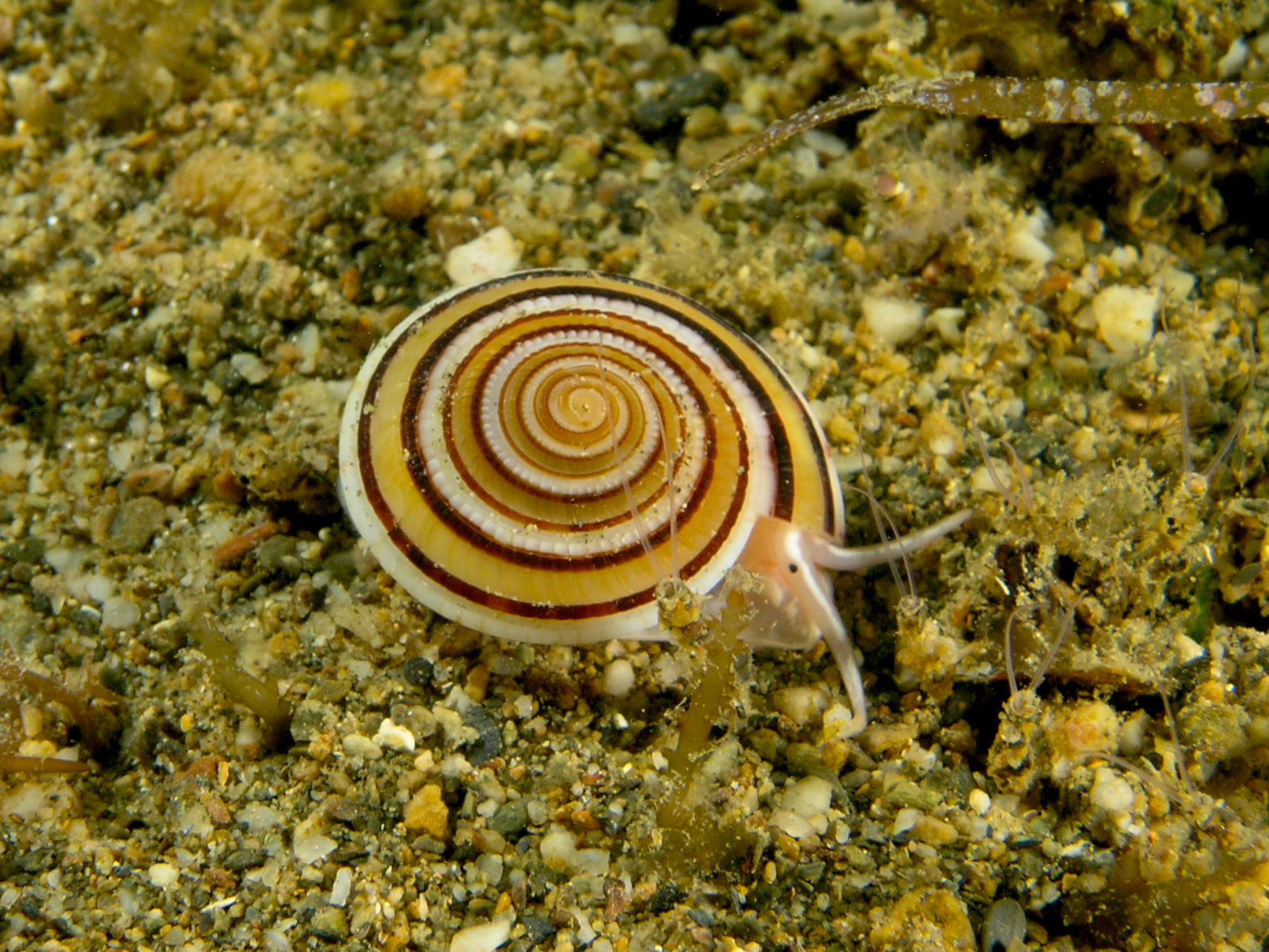
- A living Architectonica staircase shell sea snail
  Architectonica
  - †Architectonica alvear
  - †Architectonica chipolana
  - †Architectonica nobilis
- †Archosargus
  - †Archosargus probatocephalus
- Arcinella
  - †Arcinella arcinella
  - †Arcinella cornuta
  - †Arcinella draconis
- †Arcohelia
  - †Arcohelia limonensis
- Arcopagia
  - †Arcopagia dodona
  - †Arcopagia fausta
  - †Arcopagia leptalea
- Arcopsis
  - †Arcopsis adamsi
- †Arcoptera
  - †Arcoptera wagneriana
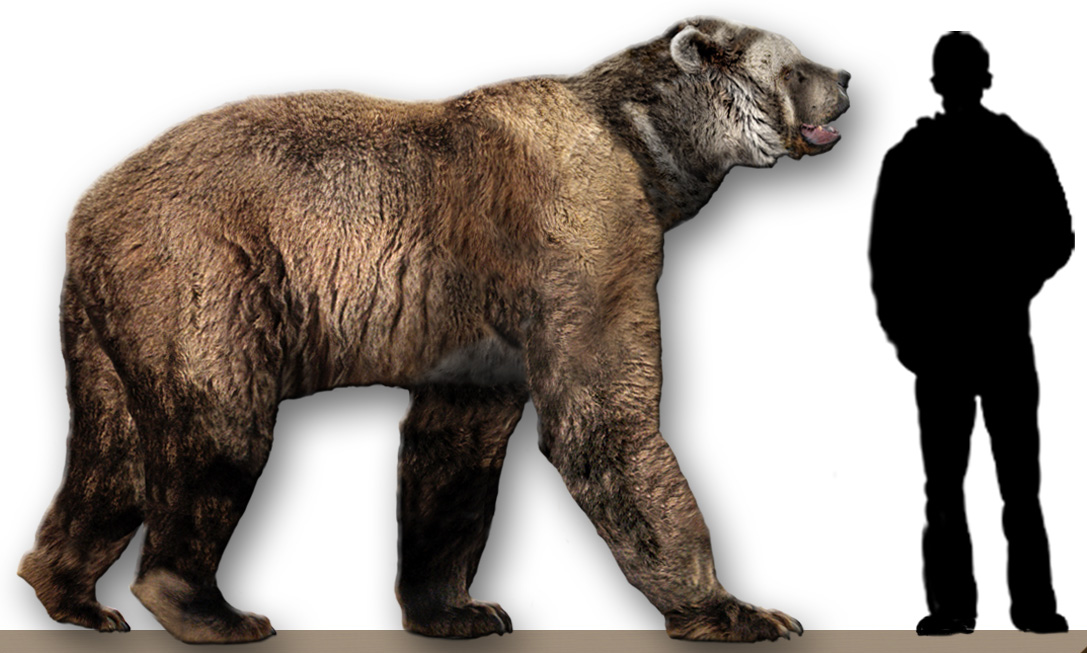
- Restoration of an Arctodus, or short-faced bear, with a human to scale
  †Arctodus
  - †Arctodus pristinus
- †Arctonasua
  - †Arctonasua eurybates
  - †Arctonasua floridana – type locality for species
- Ardea
  - †Ardea herodias
  - †Ardea polkensis – type locality for species
- Ardeola
- Argobuccinum – report made of unidentified related form or using admittedly obsolete nomenclature
  - †Argobuccinum poppelacki
- Argopecten
  - †Argopecten anteamplicostata
  - †Argopecten anteamsolarioides
  - †Argopecten chipolanus
  - †Argopecten choctawhatcheensis
  - †Argopecten comparilis
  - †Argopecten evergladensis – type locality for species
  - †Argopecten gibbus
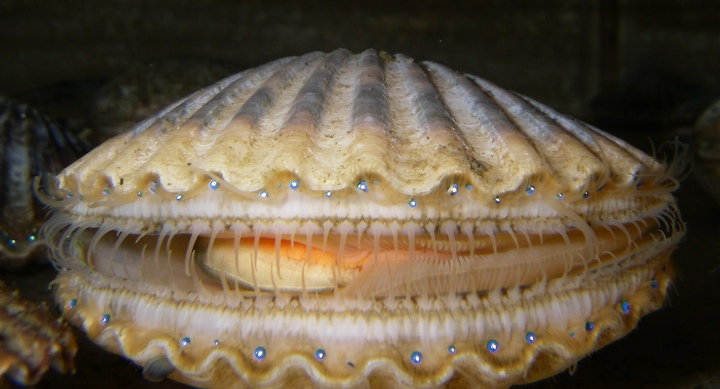
  - A living Argopecten irradians (formerly Aequipecten irradians), or Atlantic bay scallop
    †Argopecten irradians
  - †Argopecten irremotis
  - †Argopecten jacksonensis
  - †Argopecten nicholsi
  - †Argopecten tamiamiensis
  - †Argopecten vicenarius
- †Arikareeomys
- †Arikarictis
  - †Arikarictis chapini – type locality for species
- Arius
  - †Arius felis
- †Armimiltha
  - †Armimiltha disciformis
  - †Armimiltha heilprini – type locality for species
- Arossia
  - †Arossia glyptopoma
- Artena
  - †Artena glyptoconcha
  - †Artena shepardi
- †Asaphis
  - †Asaphis centenaria
- Asio
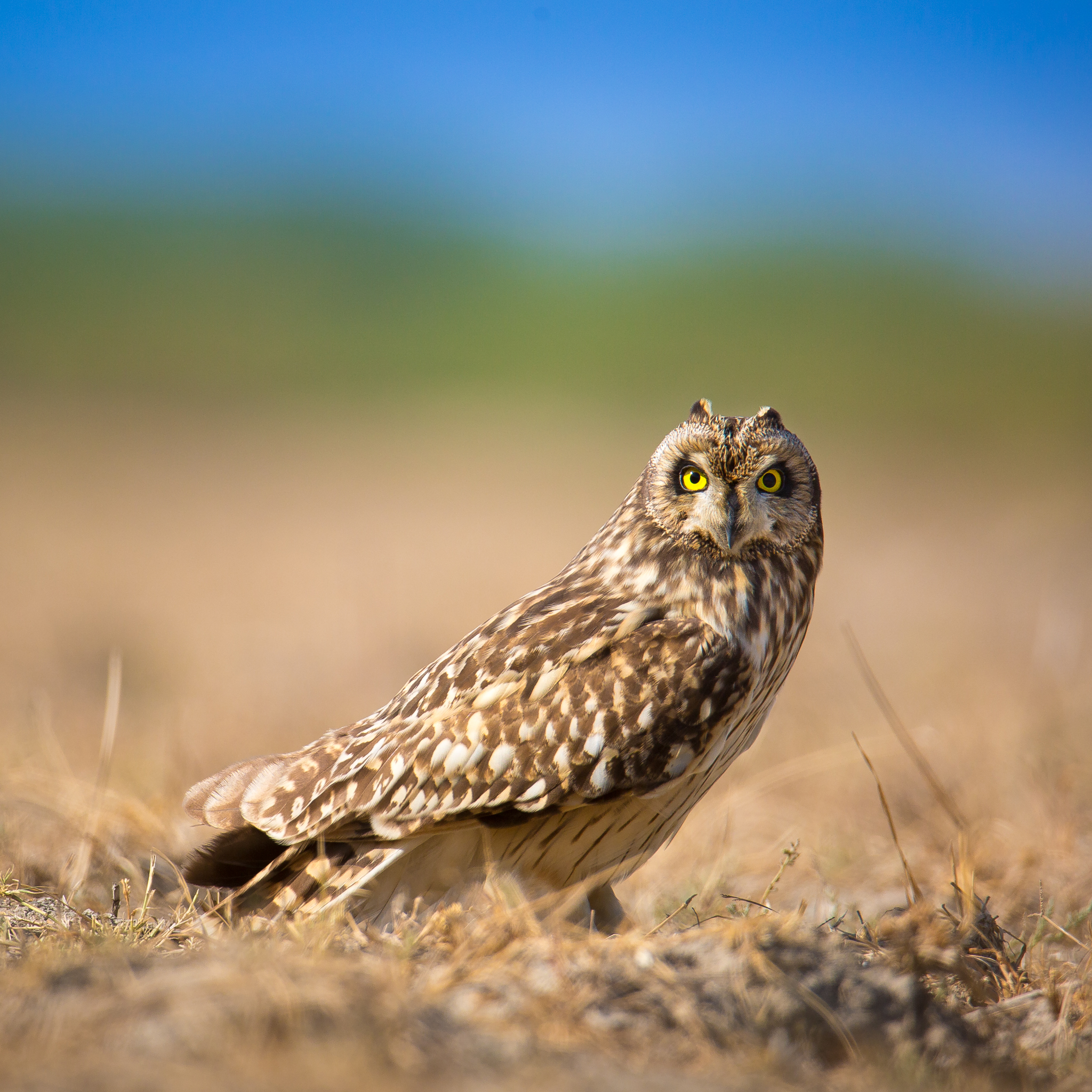
  - A living Asio flammeus, or Short-eared owl
    †Asio flammeus
- Aspella
  - †Aspella engonata
  - †Aspella petuchi
  - †Aspella senex – type locality for species
- Assiminea
  - †Assiminea aldra
- †Astaculus
- Astarte
  - †Astarte concentrica
  - †Astarte eugonia – type locality for species
  - †Astarte floridana
  - †Astarte gleni
  - †Astarte glenni
  - †Astarte isosceles – type locality for species
  - †Astarte isosocles
  - †Astarte pansyrta – type locality for species
  - †Astarte perplana – or unidentified comparable form
  - †Astarte sima – type locality for species
  - †Astarte symmetrica – or unidentified related form
  - †Astarte vaughani
  - †Astarte wagneri
- Asterosmilia
  - †Asterosmilia exarata
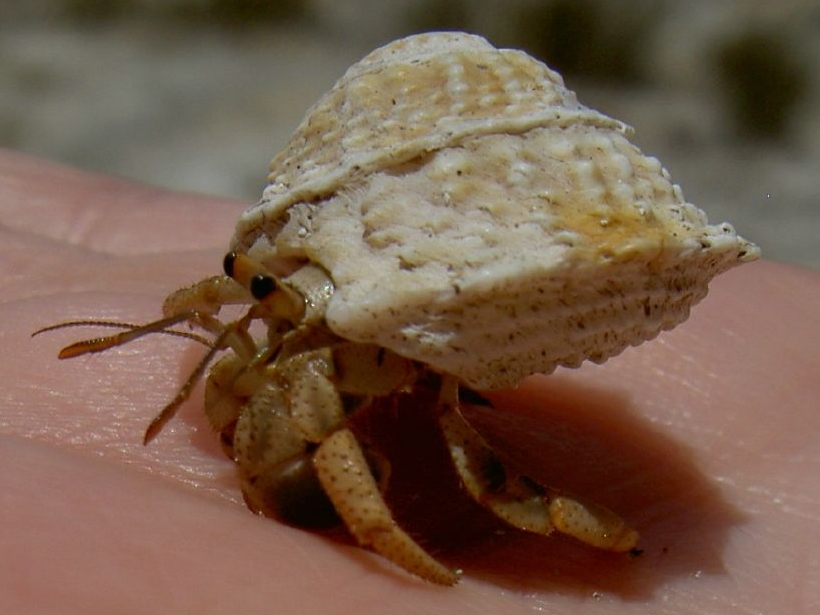
- Shell of a Lithopoma phoebium (formerly Astraea phoebia), or longspine star shell sea snail, inhabited by a hermit crab
  Astraea
  - †Astraea chipolana
  - †Astraea scolopax
  - †Astraea tectariaformis
  - †Astraea withlacoochensis
  - †Astraea witlacoochensis
- Astralium
  - †Astralium dalli
  - †Astralium longispina
  - †Astralium phoebium
  - †Astralium polkensis
- Astrangia
  - †Astrangia calhounensis – type locality for species
  - †Astrangia floridana
  - †Astrangia leonensis – type locality for species
  - †Astrangia lineata
  - †Astrangia talquinensis – type locality for species
- †Astrocoenia
  - †Astrocoenia meinzeri
- †Astrohippus
  - †Astrohippus stockii
- Astyris
  - †Astyris lunata
- †Athleenia
  - †Athleenia burryi
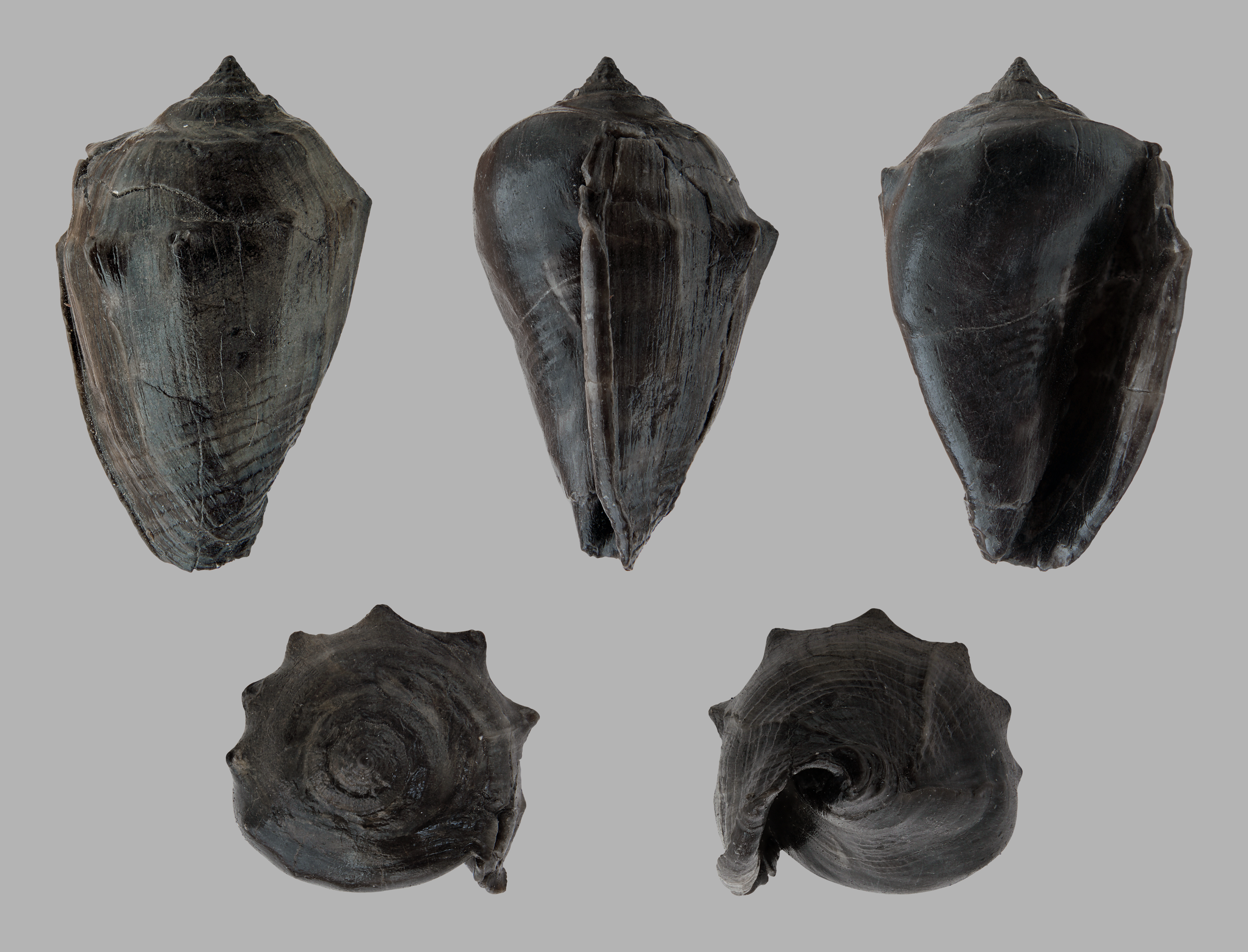
- Multiple views of a fossilized shell of the volute sea snail Athleta
  Athleta
  - †Athleta arangia – type locality for species
  - †Athleta arangius
- †Atopomys
  - †Atopomys texensis
- Atractosteus
  - †Atractosteus spatula
- Atrina
  - †Atrina caloosaensis
  - †Atrina chipolana
  - †Atrina quadrata
- Attiliosa
  - †Attiliosa aldridgei
  - †Attiliosa striata
  - †Attiliosa viaavensis
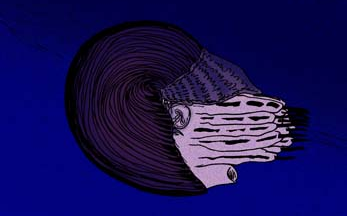
- Restoration of the Paleocene-Miocene nautiloid cephalopod Aturia
  †Aturia
  - †Aturia alabamensis
  - †Aturia cubaensis
- Atys
  - †Atys gracilis
  - †Atys obscuratus
  - †Atys oedemata
  - †Atys sandersoni
  - †Atys subscuratus
- Aurila
  - †Aurila conradi
- Axelella
  - †Axelella bifoliata
  - †Axelella desmotis – type locality for species
  - †Axelella sphenoidostoma
  - †Axelella spherotoleura
- Aythya
  - †Aythya affinis
  - †Aythya americana
  - †Aythya collaris
  - †Aythya marila
  - †Aythya valisineria
- †Aztlanolagus

== B ==
- †Babelomurex
  - †Babelomurex lindae
- Bactridium
  - †Bactridium ellipticum
  - †Bactridium sexordinatum
  - †Bactridium teges
- Bailya
  - †Bailya intricata
  - †Bailya roycei
- Baiomys
- Bairdiella
  - †Bairdiella chrysoura
- Balaenoptera
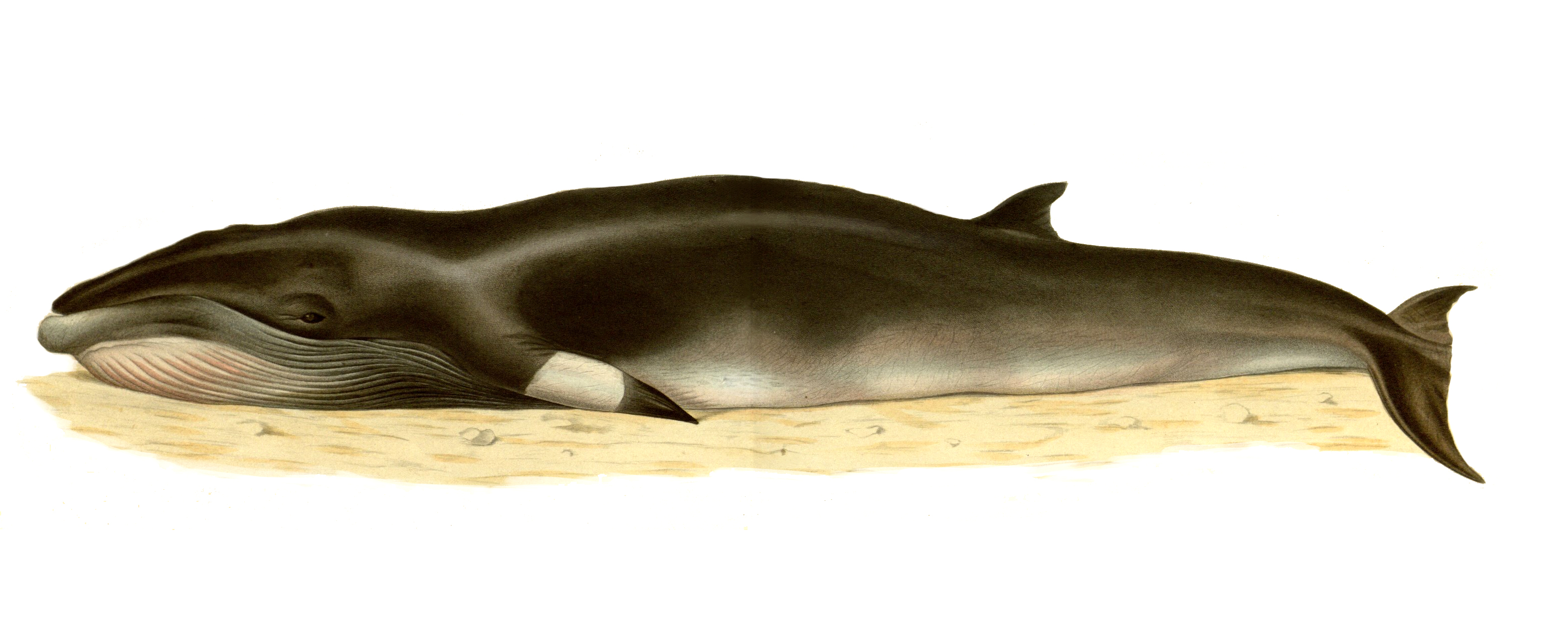
  - Illustration of a living Balaenoptera acutorostrata, or common minke whale
    †Balaenoptera acutorostrata
  - †Balaenoptera floridana – type locality for species
- Balanus
  - †Balanus bloxhamensis
  - †Balanus humilis
  - †Balanus improvisus – or unidentified related form
  - †Balanus leonensis
  - †Balanus newburnensis
  - †Balanus niveus
  - †Balanus ochlockoneensis
  - †Balanus ochlockonensis
  - †Balanus trigonus
- Balcis
  - †Balcis biconica
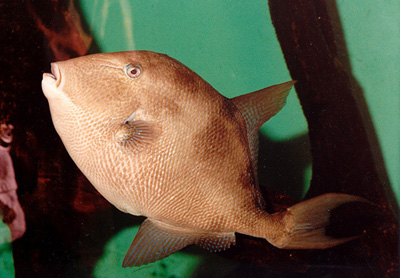
- A living Balistes triggerfish
  Balistes
- Bambusum
  - †Bambusum heladum
- Barbatia
  - †Barbatia candida
  - †Barbatia inglisia – type locality for species
  - †Barbatia marylandica
  - †Barbatia palmerae – type locality for species
  - †Barbatia propatula
- †Barbourofelis
  - †Barbourofelis loveorum
- Bartschella
  - †Bartschella parkeri – or unidentified comparable form
- Basiliscus – or unidentified comparable form
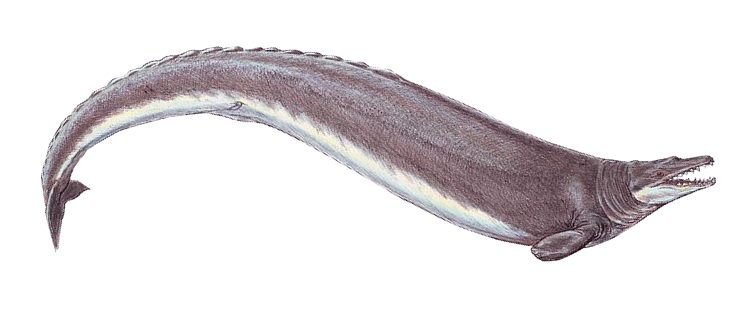
- Life restoration of the Eocene whale Basilosaurus
  †Basilosaurus
  - †Basilosaurus cetoides
- †Bassaricyonoides
  - †Bassaricyonoides phyllismillerae – type locality for species
- Basterotia
  - †Basterotia ambona – type locality for species
  - †Basterotia elliptica
  - †Basterotia floridana
  - †Basterotia miocenica – type locality for species
- Bathypsammia
- Bathytormus
  - †Bathytormus protextus
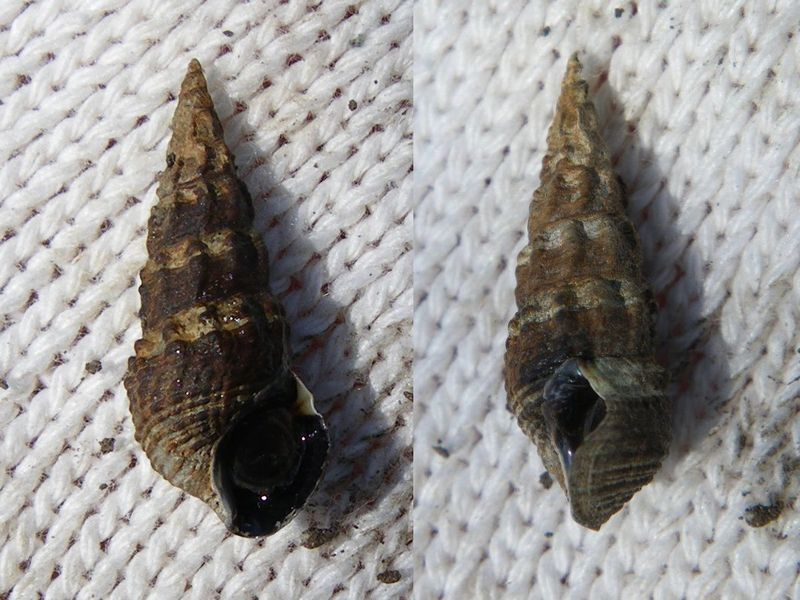
- Shells of Batillaria mudcreeper snails
  Batillaria
  - †Batillaria advena – type locality for species
  - †Batillaria minima
- †Batrachosauroides
  - †Batrachosauroides dissimulans
- Beisselina
  - †Beisselina implicata
- Bela
  - †Bela nassoides – type locality for species
- †Bellatara
  - †Bellatara americana – type locality for species
  - †Bellatara citrana – type locality for species
  - †Bellatara floridana – type locality for species
- Bellucina
  - †Bellucina waccamawensis
- †Benzoin
  - †Benzoin melissaefolium – or unidentified comparable form
- Bicorbula
- Bigenerina
  - †Bigenerina floridana
- Biomphalaria
  - †Biomphalaria havanensis
- Bison
  - †Bison antiquus
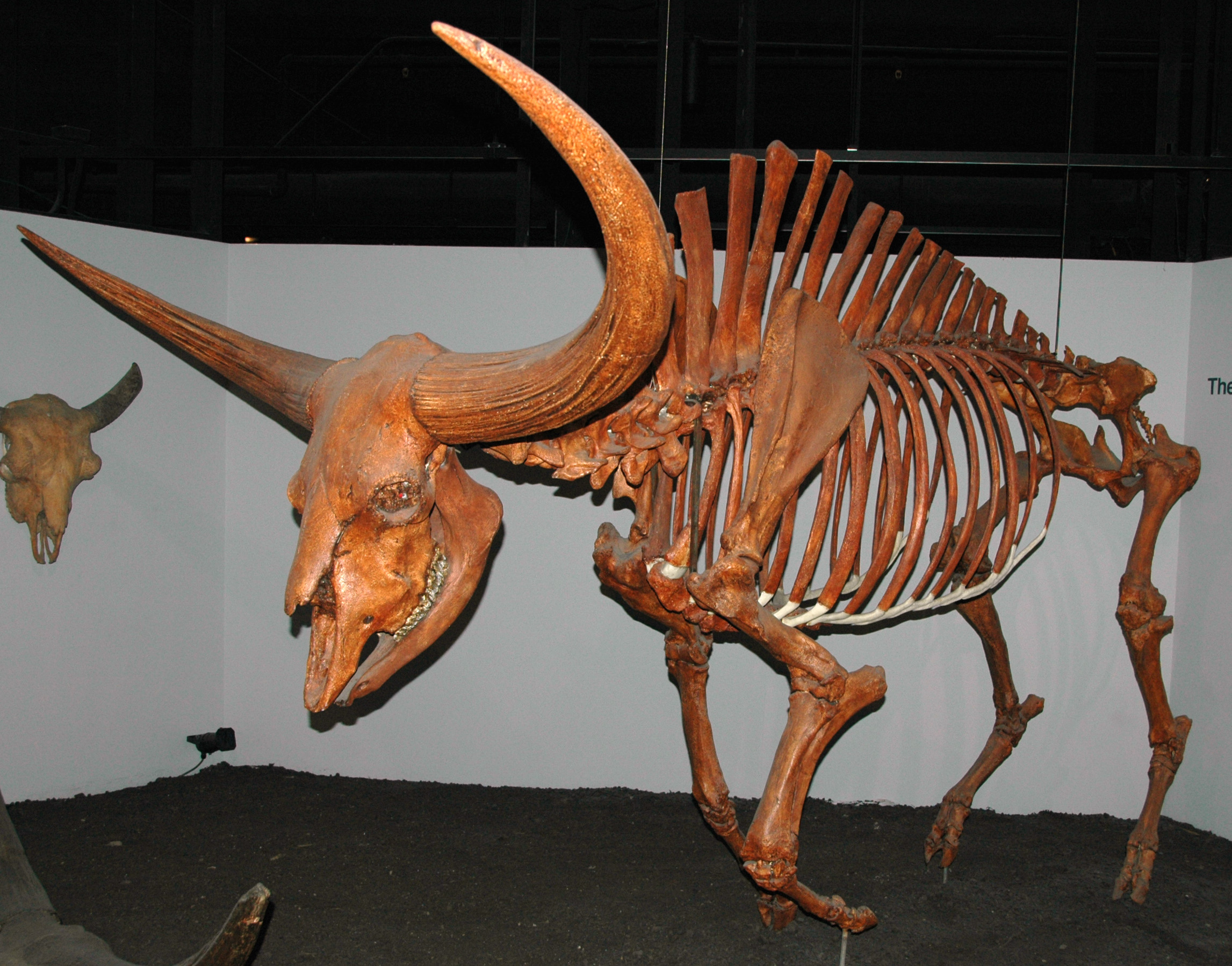
  - Mounted fossilized skeleton of the Pleistocene Bison latifrons, also known as the giant bison or long-horned bison
    †Bison latifrons
- Bittiolum
  - †Bittiolum podagrinum
  - †Bittiolum varium
- Bittium
  - †Bittium adela
  - †Bittium caseyi
  - †Bittium podagrinum
  - †Bittium priscum
  - †Bittium serenum – type locality for species
  - †Bittium sora
- Bivetopsia
  - †Bivetopsia rugosa
- †Blagraveia – tentative report
  - †Blagraveia gunteri – type locality for species
- Blarina
  - †Blarina brevicauda
  - †Blarina carolinensis
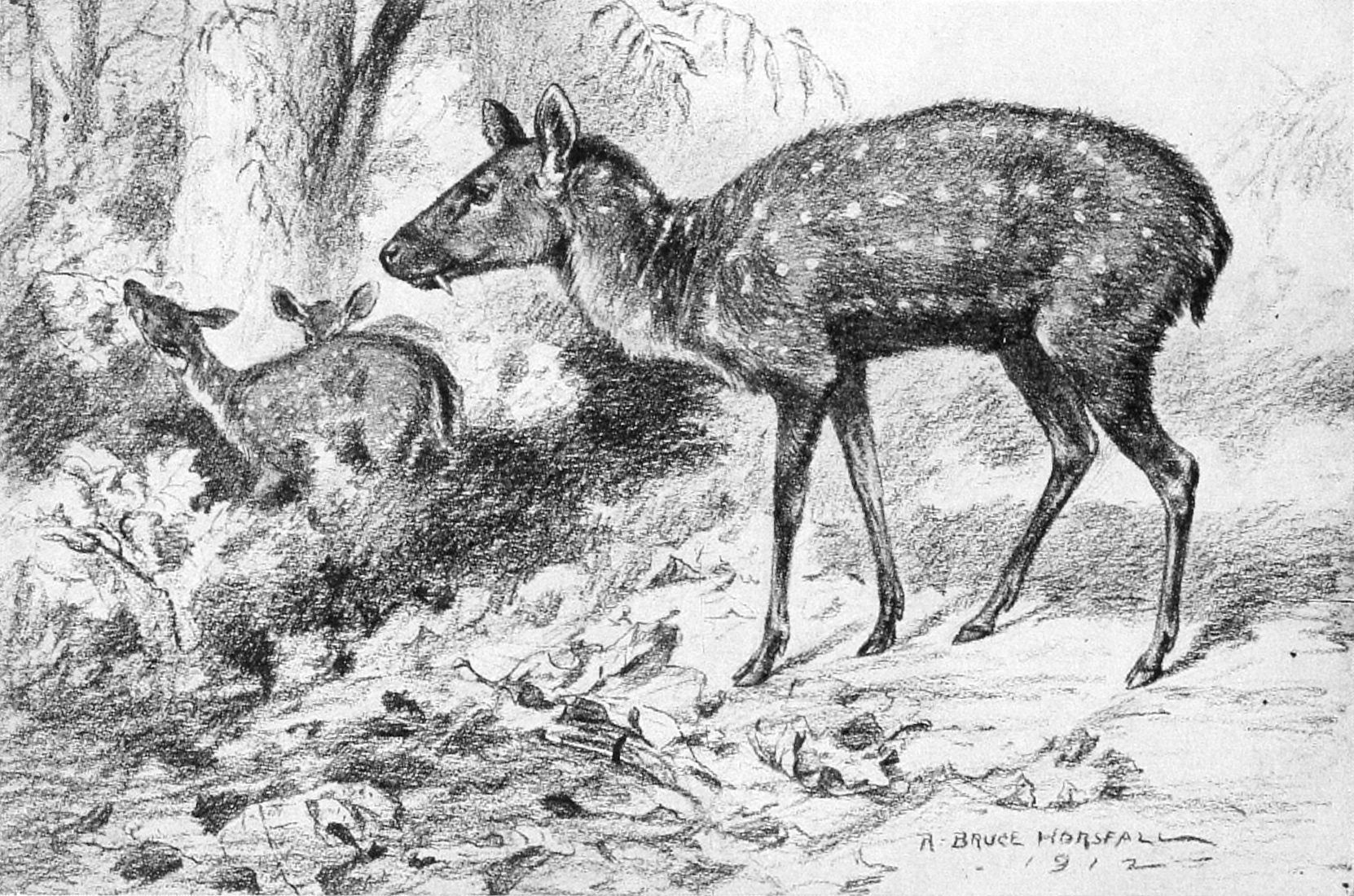
- Life restoration of the Miocene musk deer Blastomeryx. Robert Bruce Horsfall (1913).
  †Blastomeryx
- Boa
  - †Boa constrictor – type locality for species
- Bolivina
  - †Bolivina floridana
  - †Bolivina marginata
  - †Bolivina paula
  - †Bolivina pulchella
- Bonasa
  - †Bonasa umbellus
- Boonea
  - †Boonea seminuda
- †Boreortalis – type locality for genus
  - †Boreortalis laesslei – type locality for species
- Bornia
  - †Bornia dodona
  - †Bornia floridana
  - †Bornia lioica
  - †Bornia mazyckii
  - †Bornia tampae
  - †Bornia triangula – or unidentified comparable form
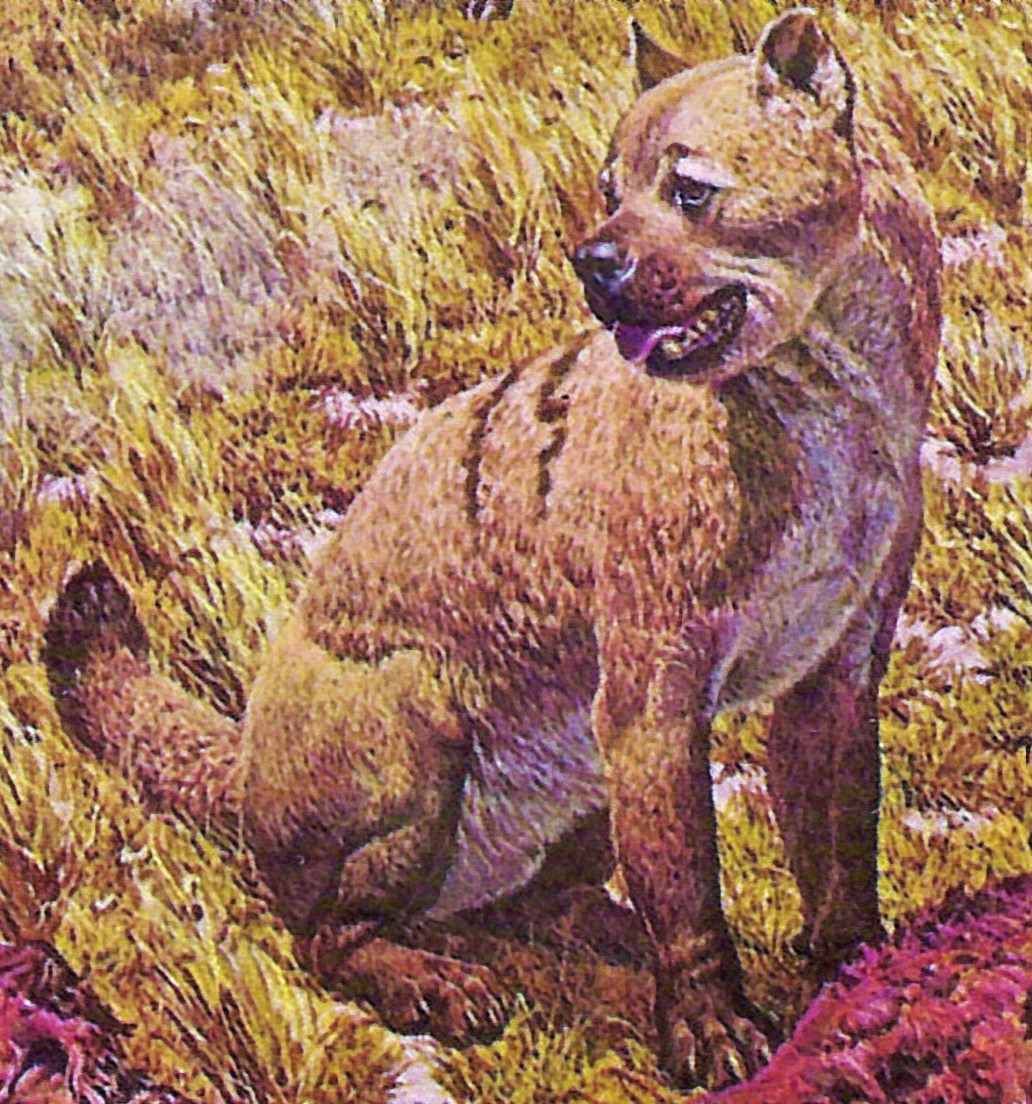
- Restoration of two of the Miocene-Pliocene bone-crushing dog genus Borophagus preying on a camel. Jay Matternes (1964).
  †Borophagus
  - †Borophagus diversidens
  - †Borophagus hilli
  - †Borophagus orc
  - †Borophagus pugnator
- Bostrycapulus
  - †Bostrycapulus aculeatus
- Botaurus
  - †Botaurus lentiginosus
- †Bothriodon
- †Bothrocorbula
  - †Bothrocorbula radiatula
  - †Bothrocorbula synarmostes
  - †Bothrocorbula wilcoxii
- Botula
  - †Botula cinnamomeus
  - †Botula fusca
- †Bouromeryx
  - †Bouromeryx americanus
- Bracebridgia
  - †Bracebridgia aculeata
- Brachidontes
  - †Brachidontes curtulus
  - †Brachidontes exustus
  - †Brachidontes vetustus
- Brachiodontes
  - †Brachiodontes exustis
  - †Brachiodontes exustus
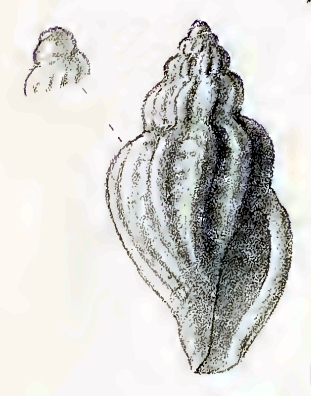
- Illustration of the shell of a Brachycythara sea snail
  †Brachycythara
  - †Brachycythara dasa – type locality for species
  - †Brachycythara gordonae
  - †Brachycythara terminula
- †Brachysycon
  - †Brachysycon amoenum
  - †Brachysycon kissimmeensis
  - †Brachysycon propeincile
- †Brachysyon
  - †Brachysyon willcoxi
- †Brana
  - †Brana dickeyi
- Branta
  - †Branta canadensis
- †Brasenia
  - †Brasenia purpurea
- †Brissopatagus
- Brissopsis
- Brissus
- Bubo
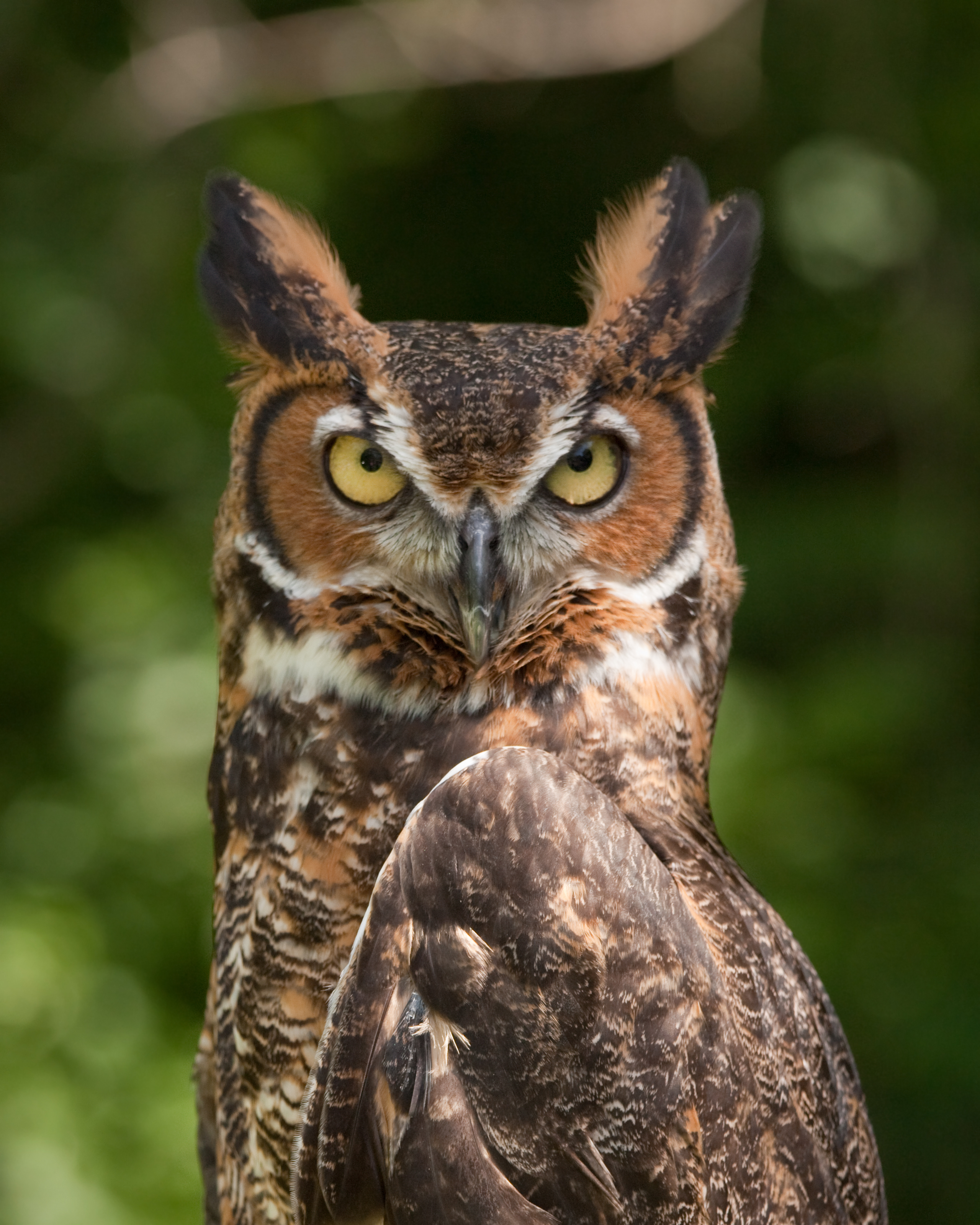
  - A living Bubo virginianus, or great horned owl
    †Bubo virginianus
- Buccella
  - †Buccella hannai
- Buccinum
  - †Buccinum contrarium
- Bucephala
  - †Bucephala albeola
  - †Bucephala ossivallis
- Buchema
- Bufo
  - †Bufo defensor – type locality for species
  - †Bufo praevius
  - †Bufo quercicus
  - †Bufo terrestris
  - †Bufo tiheni – type locality for species
  - †Bufo woodhousei
- Bulimina
  - †Bulimina gracilis
- Buliminella
  - †Buliminella curta
  - †Buliminella elegantissima
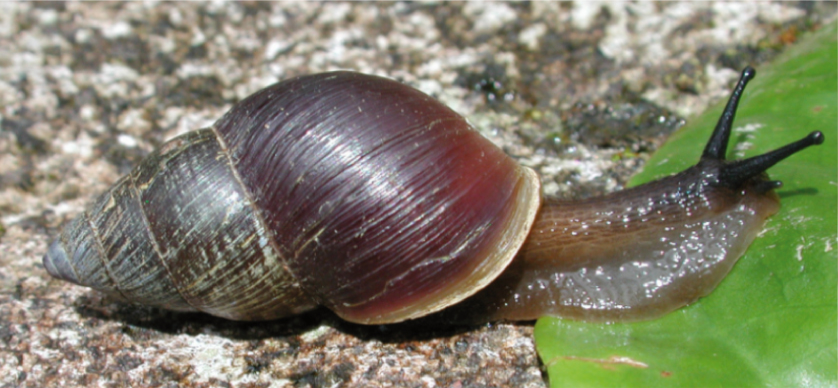
- A living Bulimulus land snail
  Bulimulus
  - †Bulimulus ballistae
  - †Bulimulus floridanus
  - †Bulimulus heilprinianus
  - †Bulimulus remolinus
  - †Bulimulus stearnsii
  - †Bulimulus tampae
  - †Bulimulus tortillus
- Bulla
  - †Bulla petrosa
  - †Bulla sarasotaensis
  - †Bulla striata
  - †Bulla umbilicata
- Bullaria
- Bursa
  - †Bursa amphritrites
  - †Bursa chipolana – type locality for species. Later reclassified in the genus Aquitanobursa.
  - †Bursa rhodostoma
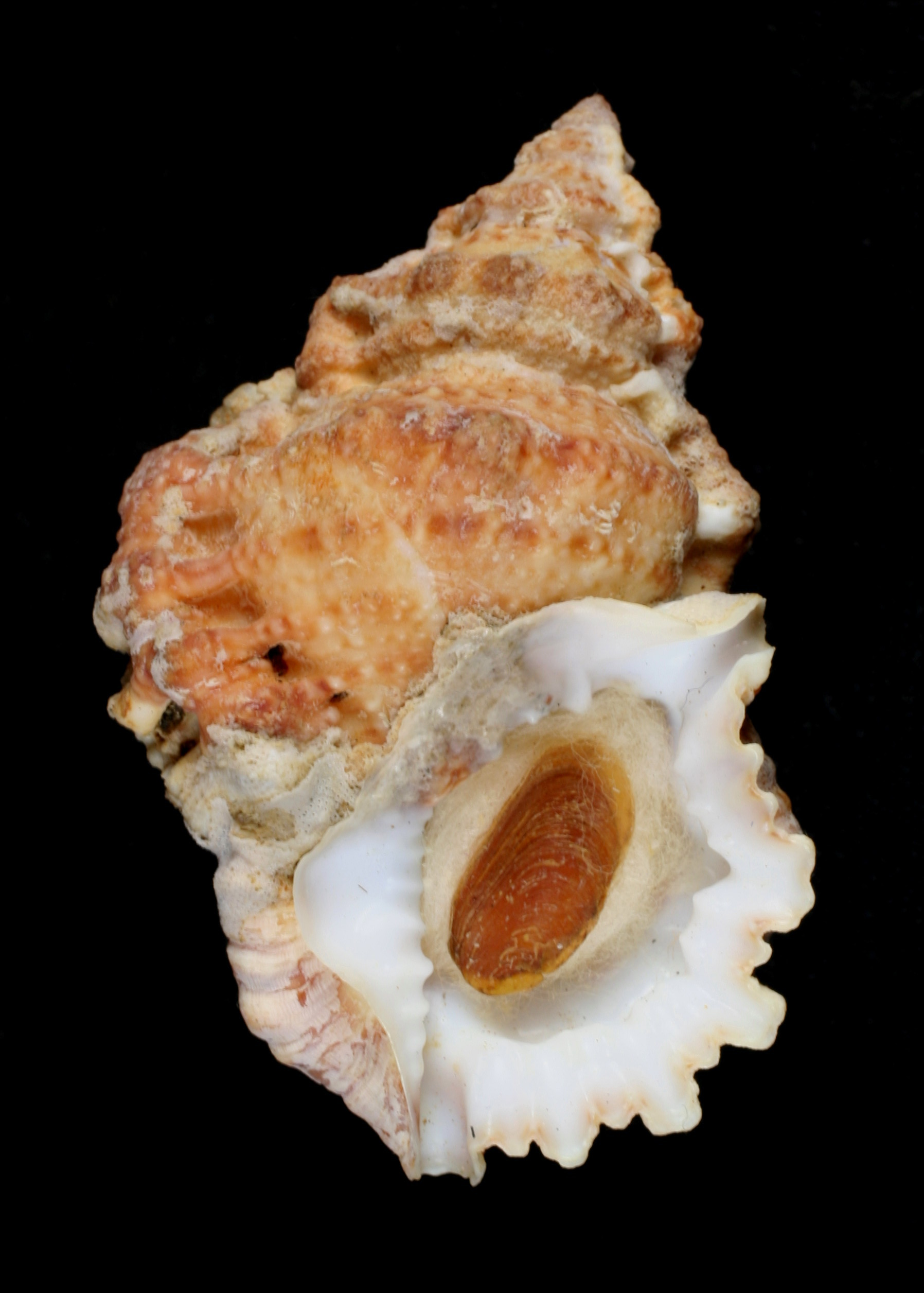
  - Shell of a Bursa rugosa frog shell sea snail
    †Bursa rugosa
- Busycon
  - †Busycon aldrichi – type locality for species
  - †Busycon atraktoides – type locality for species
  - †Busycon basingerensis
  - †Busycon bladenense
  - †Busycon burnsii
  - †Busycon caloosahatcheensis
  - †Busycon cannoni
  - †Busycon capelettii
  - †Busycon carica
  - †Busycon carolinensis
  - †Busycon carraheri
  - †Busycon chowanense
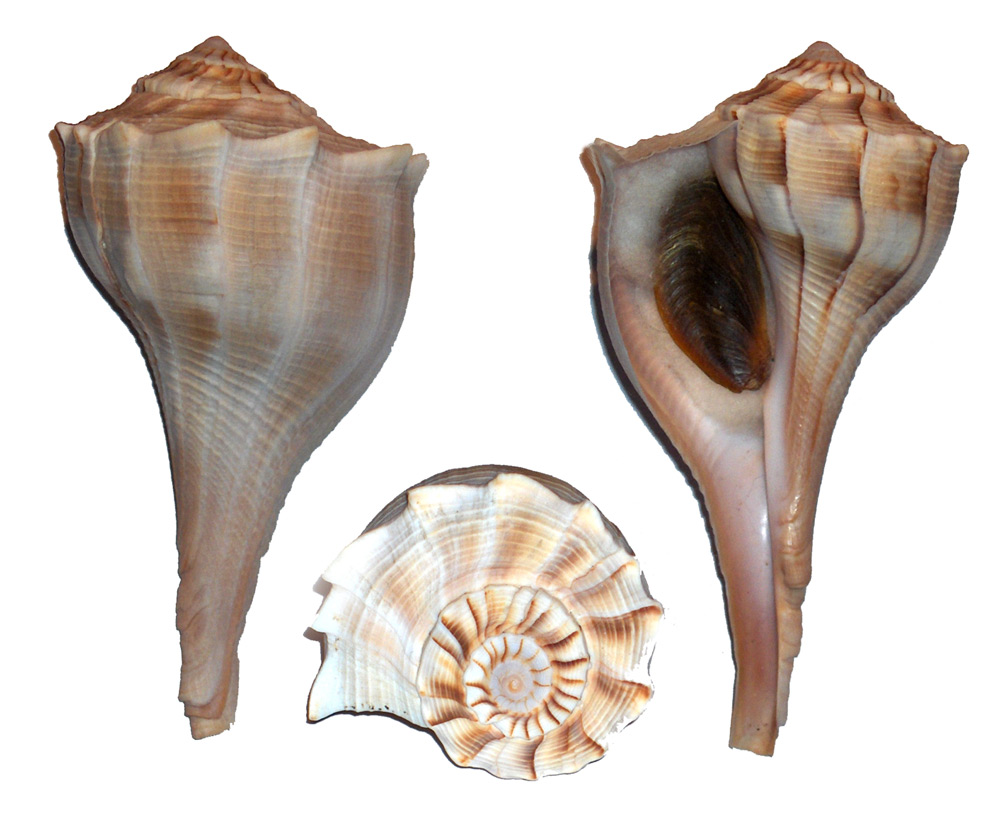
  - Shell in multiple views of a Sinistrofulgur perversum
    †Busycon contrarium
  - †Busycon dalli
  - †Busycon dasum – type locality for species
  - †Busycon demistriatum
  - †Busycon duerri
  - †Busycon echinatum
  - †Busycon eismonti
  - †Busycon elongatus
  - †Busycon epispiniger – type locality for species
  - †Busycon excavatum
  - †Busycon federicoae
  - †Busycon filosum
  - †Busycon floridanus
  - †Busycon grabaui
  - †Busycon griffini
  - †Busycon harasewychi
  - †Busycon helenae
  - †Busycon holeylandica
  - †Busycon hollisteri
  - †Busycon jonesae
  - †Busycon labellensis
  - †Busycon laevis
  - †Busycon lindajoyceae
  - †Busycon maximum
  - †Busycon miamiensis
  - †Busycon montforti
  - †Busycon montfortis
  - †Busycon obrapum – or unidentified related form
  - †Busycon ovoidea
  - †Busycon pachyus
  - †Busycon palmbeachensis
  - †Busycon pamlico
  - †Busycon perversum
  - †Busycon planulatum
  - †Busycon radix – type locality for species
  - †Busycon radula
  - †Busycon rapum
  - †Busycon roseae
  - †Busycon rugosicostata
  - †Busycon schmidti
  - †Busycon sicyoides – type locality for species
  - †Busycon sinistrum
  - †Busycon soror
  - †Busycon stellatum
  - †Busycon superbus
  - †Busycon tampaense
  - †Busycon titan
  - †Busycon tomeui
  - †Busycon tropicalis
  - †Busycon tudiculatum
  - †Busycon turbinalis
  - †Busycon waltfrancei
  - †Busycon yeehaw
- Busycotypus
  - †Busycotypus aepynotum
  - †Busycotypus bicoronatum
  - †Busycotypus canaliculatus
  - †Busycotypus incile
  - †Busycotypus libertiensis
  - †Busycotypus scotti
  - †Busycotypus spiratus
- Buteo
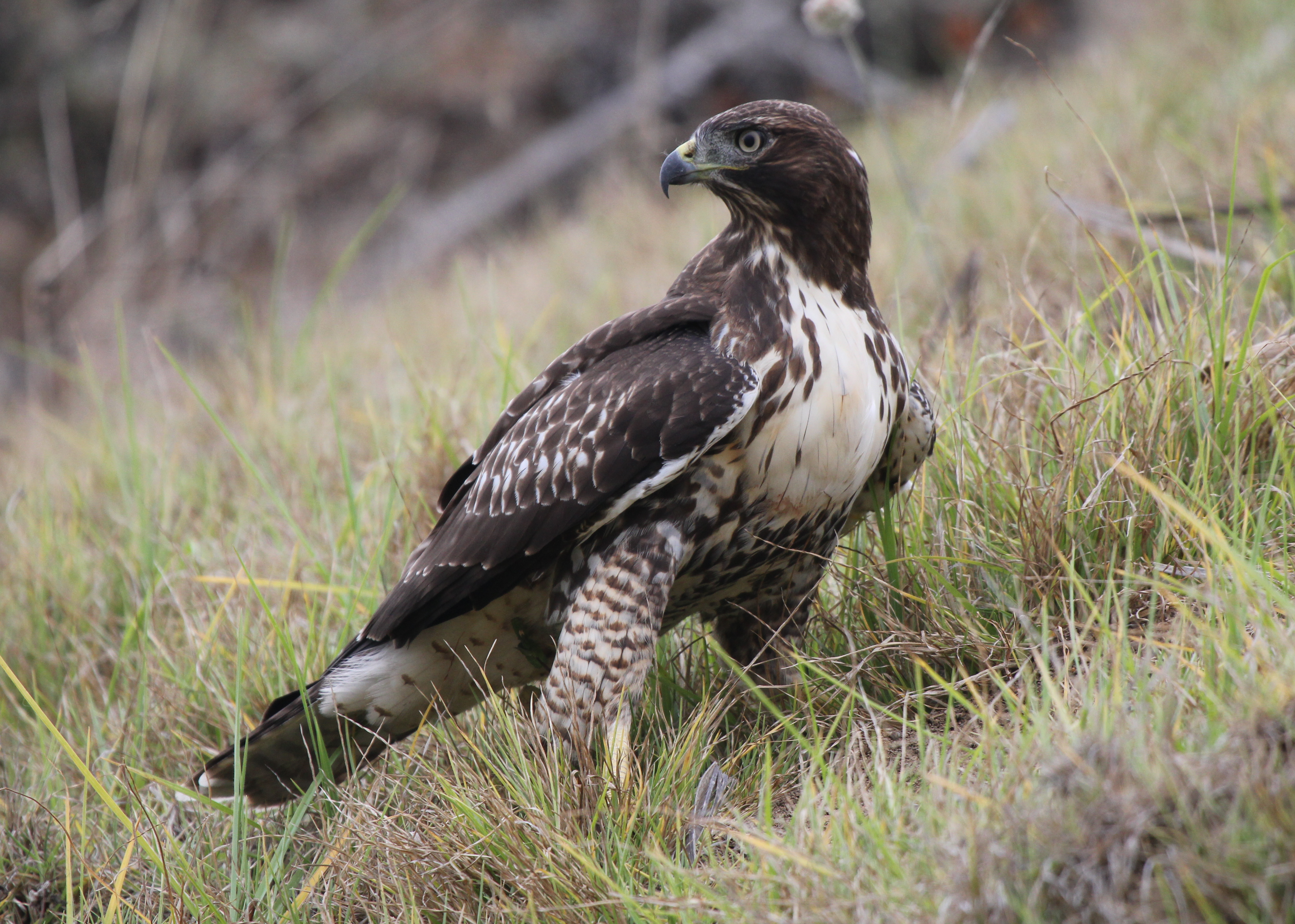
  - A living Buteo jamaicensis, or red-tailed hawk
    †Buteo jamaicensis
  - †Buteo lineatus
  - †Buteo platypterus
  - †Buteo swainsoni
- Buteogallus
  - †Buteogallus fragilis
  - †Buteogallus urubitinga
- Butorides
  - †Butorides validipes – type locality for species
  - †Butorides virescens

== C ==
- Cadulus
  - †Cadulus blountense
  - †Cadulus carolinensis
  - †Cadulus floridanus
  - †Cadulus quadridentatus
  - †Cadulus tetrodon
  - †Cadulus thallus
- Caecum
  - †Caecum chipolanum
  - †Caecum cinctum
  - †Caecum circumvolutum
  - †Caecum cooperi
  - †Caecum cornellum
  - †Caecum cycloferum
  - †Caecum floridanum
  - †Caecum imbricatum
  - †Caecum pararegulare – type locality for species
  - †Caecum pulchellum
  - †Caecum regulare
  - †Caecum strigosum
  - †Caecum tortile
- †Calamagras
  - †Calamagras floridanus – type locality for species
  - †Calamagras platyspondyla
- Calidris
  - †Calidris albus – or unidentified comparable form
  - †Calidris canutus – or unidentified comparable form
  - †Calidris pacis – type locality for species
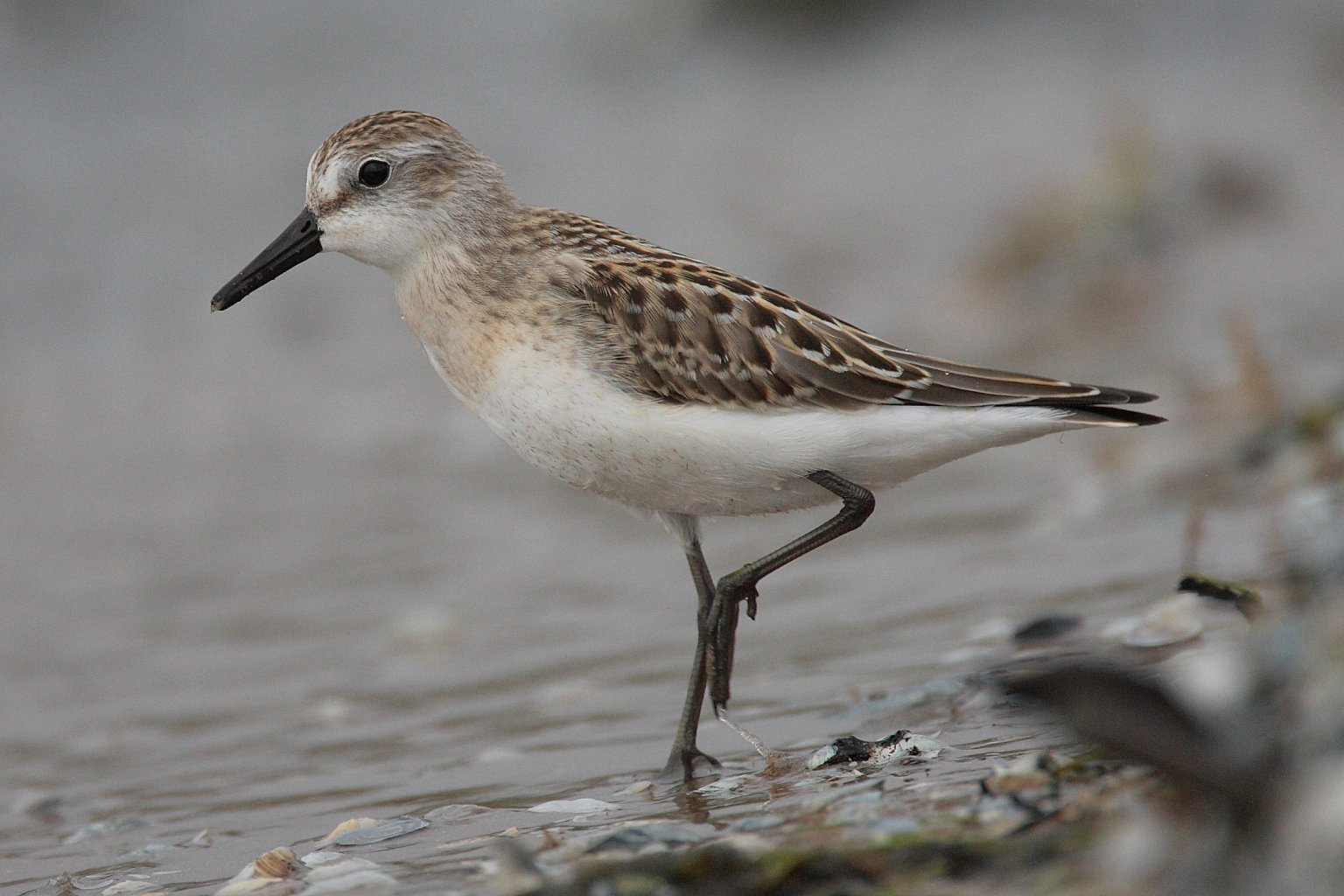
  - A living Calidris pusilla, or semipalmated sandpiper
    †Calidris pusilla – or unidentified comparable form
- †Calippus
  - †Calippus cerasinus
  - †Calippus elachistus
  - †Calippus hondurensis
  - †Calippus maccartyi
  - †Calippus martini
  - †Calippus proplacidus
- Callianassa
  - †Callianassa inglisestris – type locality for species
- Calliostoma
  - †Calliostoma ceramicum
  - †Calliostoma euconulum
  - †Calliostoma euglyptum
  - †Calliostoma exile
  - †Calliostoma flumenvadum – type locality for species
  - †Calliostoma grammaticum
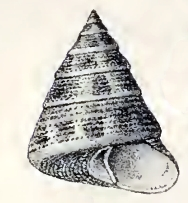
  - Illustration of the shell of a Calliostoma jujubinum
    †Calliostoma jujubinum
  - †Calliostoma jujucanulum
  - †Calliostoma jujuconulum
  - †Calliostoma lindae
  - †Calliostoma metrium
  - †Calliostoma pauli
  - †Calliostoma permagnum
  - †Calliostoma philanthropus
  - †Calliostoma philonthopus
  - †Calliostoma prejujubinum
  - †Calliostoma pulchrum
  - †Calliostoma rhombotoide – type locality for species
  - †Calliostoma roseolum
  - †Calliostoma rugabasis – type locality for species
  - †Calliostoma seminolum
  - †Calliostoma silicatum
  - †Calliostoma sincerum
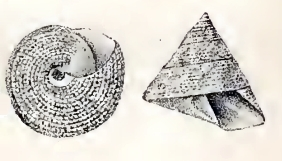
  - Illustration in multiple views of the shell of a Calliostoma tampaense
    †Calliostoma tampaense
  - †Calliostoma tampicum
  - †Calliostoma willcoxianum
  - †Calliostoma yucatecanum – or unidentified comparable form
- Callista
  - †Callista annexa
- Calloarca
  - †Calloarca irregularis
  - †Calloarca lenensis
  - †Calloarca phalacra
  - †Calloarca taeniata
- Callocardia
  - †Callocardia albofonte – type locality for species
  - †Callocardia nux
  - †Callocardia prosayana – type locality for species
  - †Callocardia silicata
  - †Callocardia sincera
- †Callophoca
  - †Callophoca obscura
- Callucina
  - †Callucina cala
  - †Callucina keenae
- †Calodiscus
  - †Calodiscus retiferus
- †Caloosarca
  - †Caloosarca aequilitas
- †Calophos
  - †Calophos nanus
  - †Calophos plicatile
  - †Calophos wilsoni
- Calotrophon
  - †Calotrophon multangula
  - †Calotrophon myakka
  - †Calotrophon ostrearum
  - †Calotrophon phagon
- †Calusaconus
  - †Calusaconus evergladensis
  - †Calusaconus spuroides
  - †Calusaconus tomeui
- †Calusacypraea
  - †Calusacypraea briani
  - †Calusacypraea globulina
  - †Calusacypraea sarasotaensis
  - †Calusacypraea tequesta
- Calyptraea
  - †Calyptraea centralis
  - †Calyptraea conradi
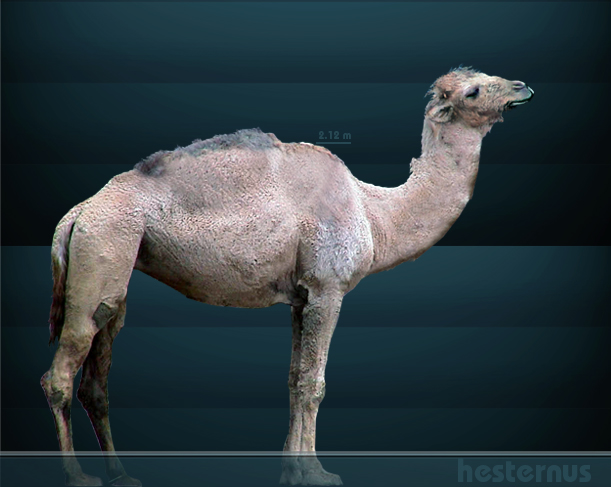
- Life restoration of the Pliocene-Holocene camel Camelops
  †Camelops
- Campylocythere
- Cancellaria
  - †Cancellaria aldrichi
  - †Cancellaria amoena
  - †Cancellaria ancycla – type locality for species
  - †Cancellaria atraktoides
  - †Cancellaria calusa
  - †Cancellaria cannoni
  - †Cancellaria clewistonensis
  - †Cancellaria conradiana
  - †Cancellaria defuniak – type locality for species
  - †Cancellaria druidarum – type locality for species
  - †Cancellaria ecuheea
  - †Cancellaria eucheea – type locality for species
  - †Cancellaria floridana
  - †Cancellaria mitrodita – type locality for species
  - †Cancellaria paramoorei – type locality for species
  - †Cancellaria pinguis – type locality for species
  - †Cancellaria reticulata
  - †Cancellaria rotunda
  - †Cancellaria spherotopleura – type locality for species
  - †Cancellaria stibara – type locality for species
  - †Cancellaria subtiarophora
  - †Cancellaria tabulata
  - †Cancellaria waltoniana – type locality for species
- Cancilla
  - †Cancilla desmia
- Cancris
  - †Cancris sagra
- Canis
  - †Canis armbrusteri
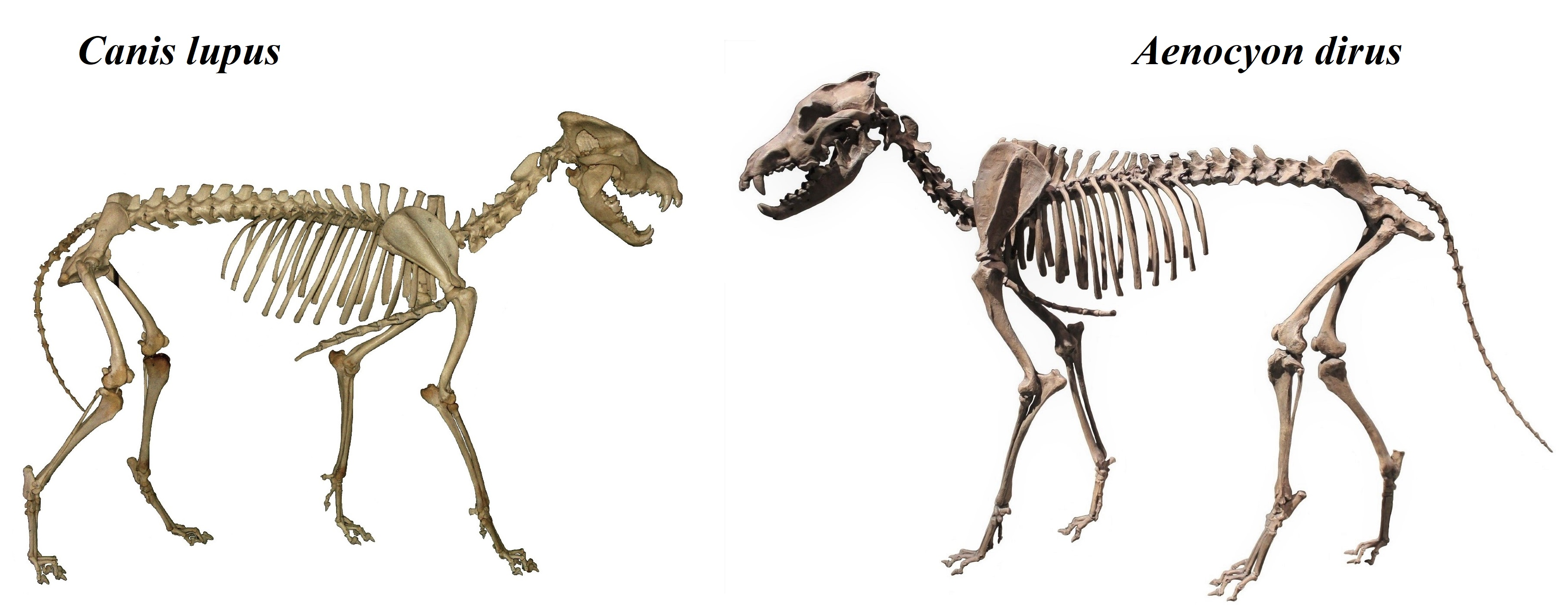
  - Modern mounted skeleton of Canis lupus, the grey wolf, to scale with a fossilized skeleton of the Pleistocene wolf Canis dirus, or dire wolf
    †Canis dirus – type locality for species
  - †Canis edwardii
  - †Canis familiaris
  - †Canis latrans
  - †Canis lepophagus
  - †Canis lupus
  - †Canis rufus
- Cantharus
  - †Cantharus clarksvillensis
  - †Cantharus multangulata
  - †Cantharus pauper
- Capella
  - †Capella delicata
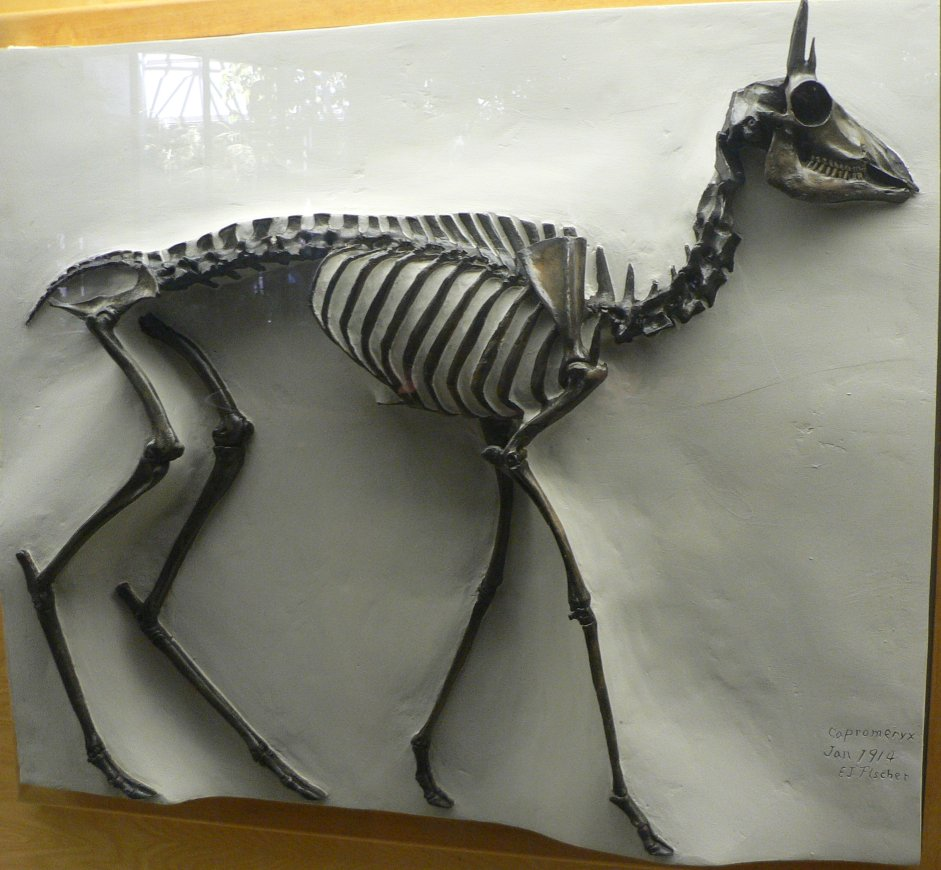
- Fossilized skeleton of the Pleistocene dwarf pronghorn Capromeryx
  †Capromeryx
  - †Capromeryx arizonensis
- Capulus
  - †Capulus chipolanus – type locality for species
- Caracara
  - †Caracara cheriway
  - †Caracara plancus
  - †Caracara prelutosa
  - †Caracara prelutosus
- Caranx
  - †Caranx hippos
- Carcharhinus
  - †Carcharhinus brevipinna
  - †Carcharhinus leucas
  - †Carcharhinus limbatus
  - †Carcharhinus plumbeus
  - †Carcharhinus signatus
- Carcharias
  - †Carcharias taurus
- Carcharodon
  - †Carcharodon auriculatus
  - †Carcharodon carcharias
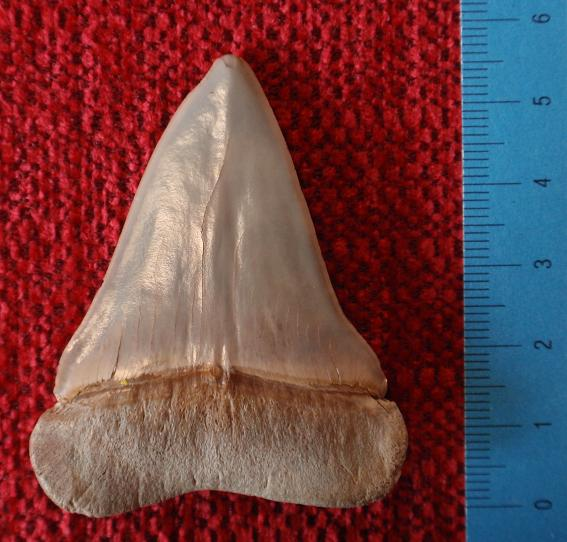
  - Fossilized tooth of the Miocene-Pliocene shark Cosmopolitodus hastalis, or broad-toothed mako
    †Carcharodon hastalis
  - †Carcharodon subauriculatus
- Cardinalis
  - †Cardinalis cardinalis
- Cardiolucina
  - †Cardiolucina multistriatus
  - †Cardiolucina parawhitfieldi – type locality for species
- Cardiomya
  - †Cardiomya costellata
  - †Cardiomya mansfieldi
  - †Cardiomya orbignyi
  - †Cardiomya ornatissima
- Cardita
  - †Cardita apotegea
  - †Cardita liveoakensis
  - †Cardita seminolensis
  - †Cardita shepardi
- Carditamera
  - †Carditamera anclotensis
  - †Carditamera apotegea – type locality for species
  - †Carditamera arata
  - †Carditamera catharia
  - †Carditamera dasytes
  - †Carditamera defuniak – type locality for species
  - †Carditamera floridana
  - †Carditamera tegea
  - †Carditamera vaughani
- Cardium
  - †Cardium aclinensis
  - †Cardium brooksvillensis
  - †Cardium gadsdenense – or unidentified comparable form
  - †Cardium hernandoense – or unidentified related form
  - †Cardium hernandoensis
  - †Cardium panastrum
  - †Cardium precursor
  - †Cardium suwannense
- Caretta
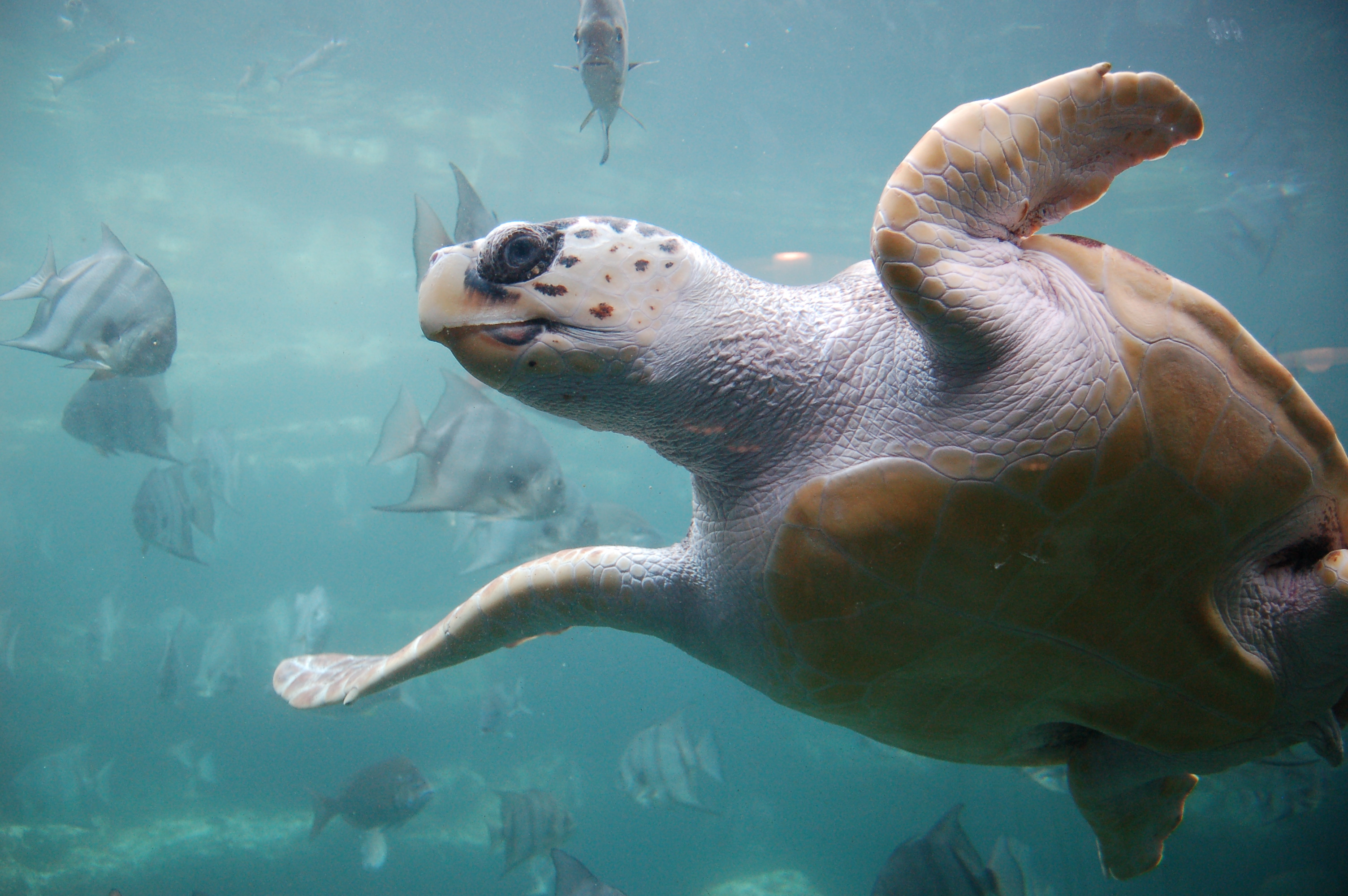
  - A living Caretta caretta, or loggerhead sea turtle
    †Caretta caretta
- †Carex
- †Caricella
  - †Caricella florea – type locality for species
  - †Caricella obsoleta – type locality for species
  - †Caricella pycnoplecta – type locality for species
- Carinodrillia
  - †Carinodrillia cymatoides – type locality for species
  - †Carinodrillia pylonia
- †Carolia
  - †Carolia floridana
- †Carolinapecten
  - †Carolinapecten darlingtonensis
  - †Carolinapecten eboreus
  - †Carolinapecten jamieae
  - †Carolinapecten senescens
  - †Carolinapecten solaroides
  - †Carolinapecten urbannaensis
  - †Carolinapecten walkerensis
  - †Carolinapecten watsonensis
  - †Carolinapecten yorkensis
- †Carpella
  - †Carpella gallinago
- Carphophis
  - †Carphophis amoenus
- †Carpocyon
  - †Carpocyon limosus – type locality for species
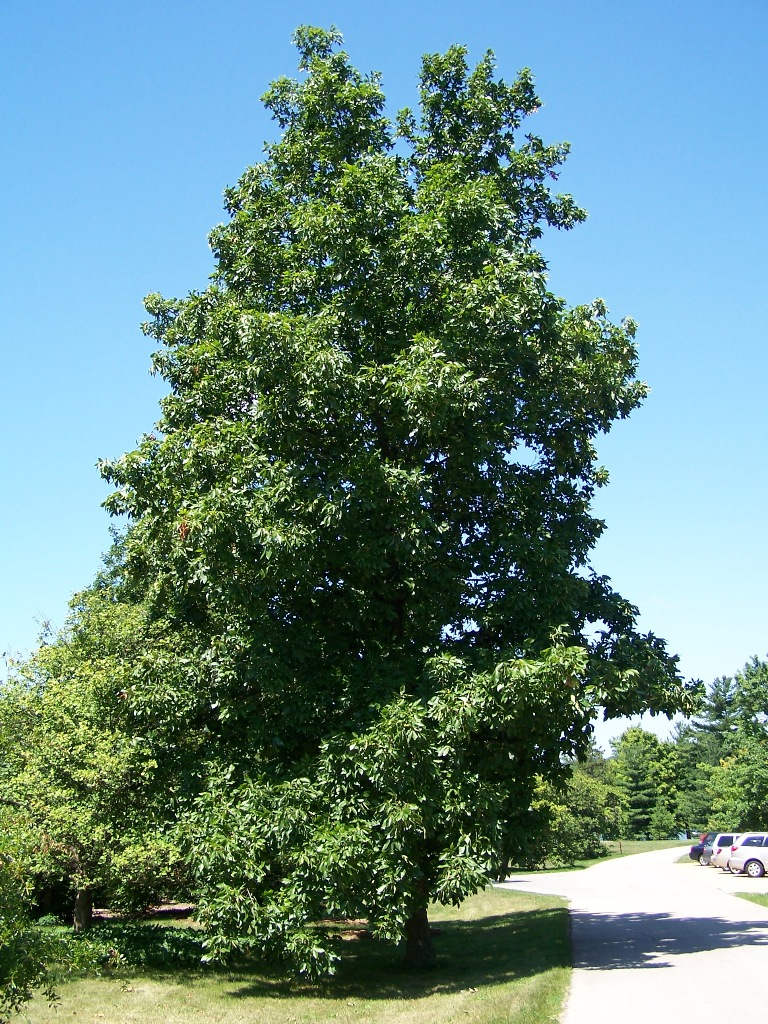
- A living Carya, or hickory tree
  Carya
- Carychium
  - †Carychium mexicanum
- Caryocorbula
  - †Caryocorbula cala
  - †Caryocorbula caribaea
  - †Caryocorbula contracta
  - †Caryocorbula cuneata
  - †Caryocorbula densata
  - †Caryocorbula funiakensis
  - †Caryocorbula leonensis
  - †Caryocorbula parawhitfieldi
  - †Caryocorbula seminella
  - †Caryocorbula whitfieldi
- †Casmerodius
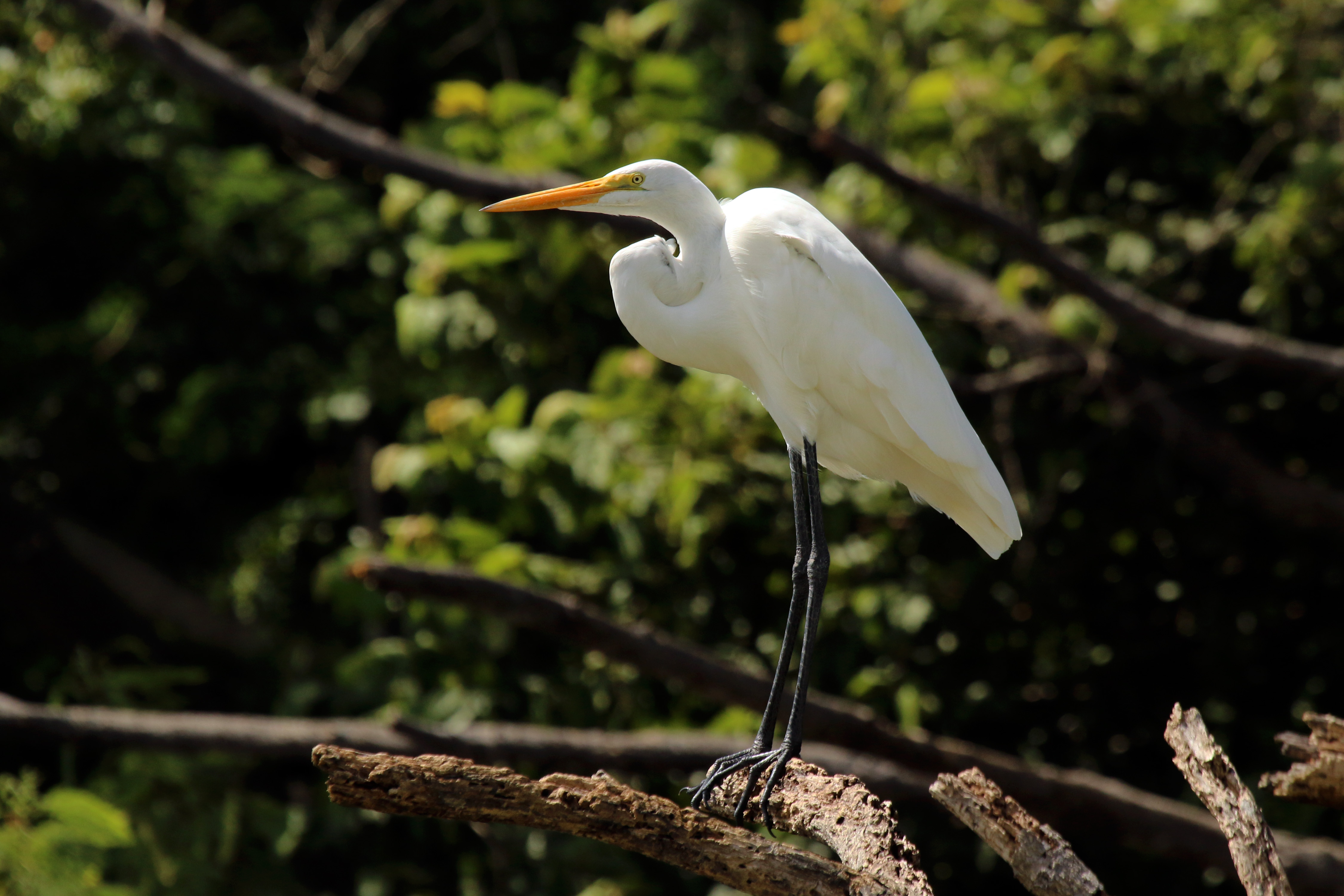
  - A living Ardea alba, or great egret
    †Casmerodius albus
- Cassidulina
  - †Cassidulina crassa
  - †Cassidulina laevigata
- Cassidulinoides
  - †Cassidulinoides braydi
- Cassis
  - †Cassis delta
  - †Cassis flintensis
  - †Cassis floridensis
  - †Cassis jameshoubricki
  - †Cassis ketteri
  - †Cassis madagascariensis
  - †Cassis schnirei
- Castanea
- Castor
  - †Castor californicus
  - †Castor canadensis
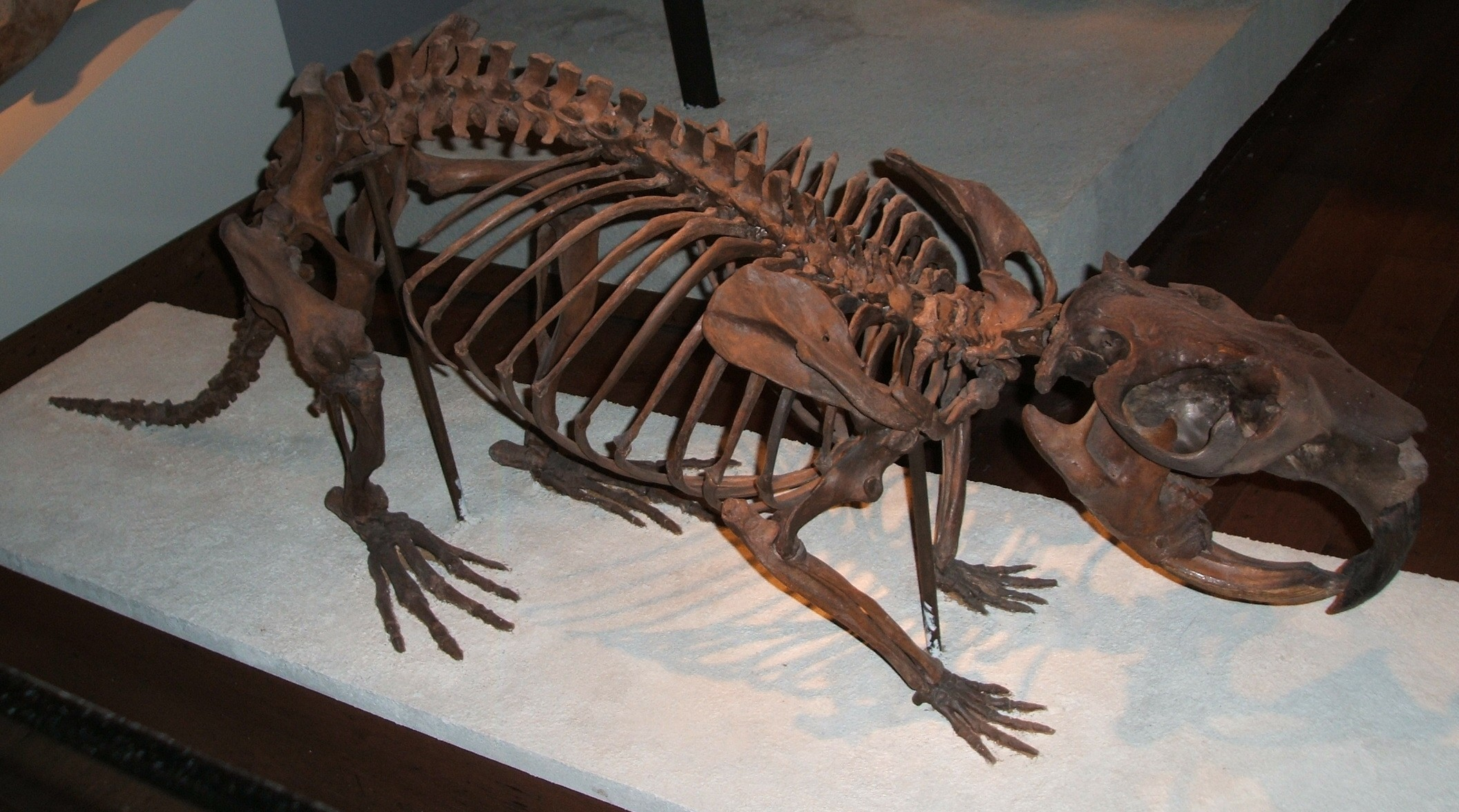
- Mounted fossilized skeleton of the Pliocene-Pleistocene giant beaver Castoroides
  †Castoroides
  - †Castoroides leiseyorum – type locality for species
  - †Castoroides ohioensis
- Cathartes
  - †Cathartes aura
- Catharus
- Cavilinga
  - †Cavilinga blanda
  - †Cavilinga trisulcata
- Celleporaria
  - †Celleporaria fissurata
- Celleporina
  - †Celleporina umbonata
- †Celliforma
  - †Celliforma nuda
- †Centetodon
  - †Centetodon magnus
- Centropomus
- †Cepolis
  - †Cepolis instrumosa
  - †Cepolis latebrosa
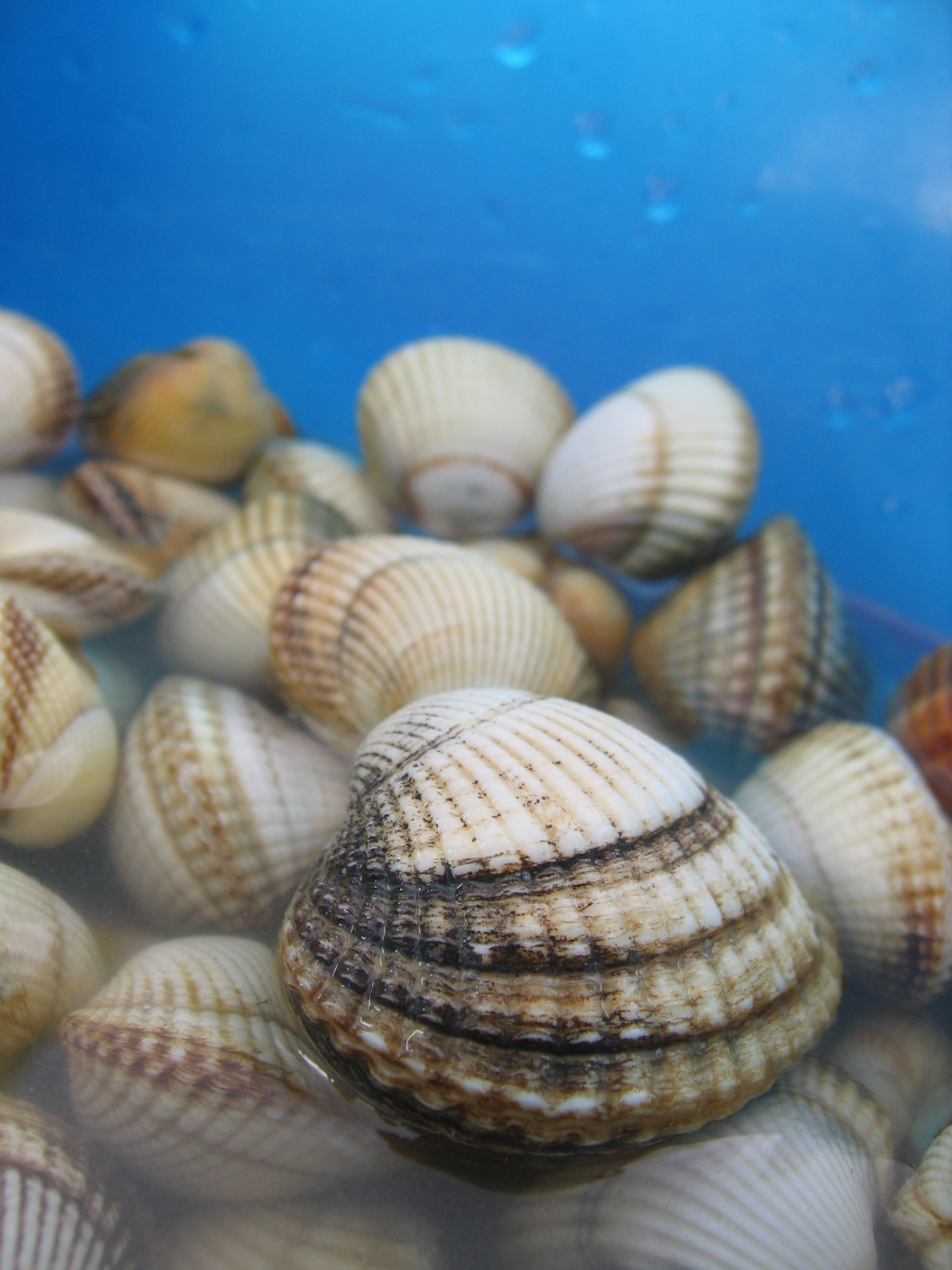
- Living Cerastoderma cockles
  Cerastoderma
  - †Cerastoderma chipolanum
  - †Cerastoderma druidicum
  - †Cerastoderma panastrum
  - †Cerastoderma waltonianum
- †Cerion
  - †Cerion anodonta
- Cerithidea
  - †Cerithidea briani
  - †Cerithidea costatus
  - †Cerithidea diegelae
  - †Cerithidea duerri
  - †Cerithidea jenniferae
  - †Cerithidea lindae
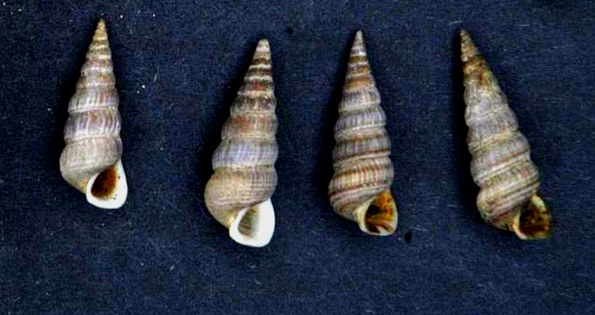
  - Shells of Cerithideopsis pliculosa, or the plicate horn shell sea snail
    †Cerithidea pliculosa
  - †Cerithidea scalariformis
  - †Cerithidea xenos
- Cerithioclava
  - †Cerithioclava caloosaensis
  - †Cerithioclava caloosanae
  - †Cerithioclava eutextile
  - †Cerithioclava turriculus
- Cerithiopsis
  - †Cerithiopsis aralia
  - †Cerithiopsis dauca
  - †Cerithiopsis greenii
  - †Cerithiopsis inopinus – type locality for species
  - †Cerithiopsis silicata
  - †Cerithiopsis vinca
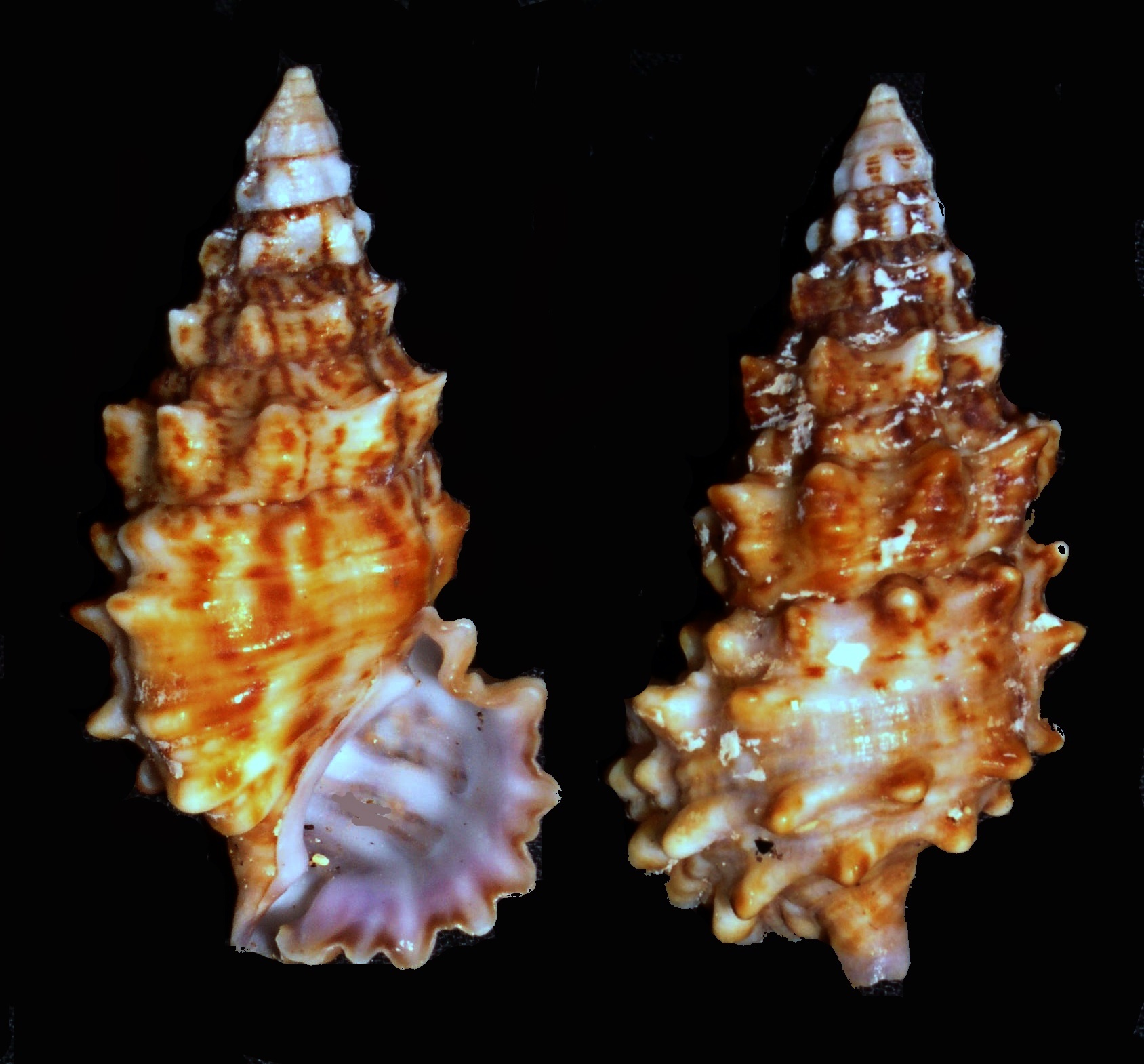
- Two views of a Cerithium cerith sea snail
  Cerithium
  - †Cerithium atratum
  - †Cerithium caloosaene
  - †Cerithium caloosaense
  - †Cerithium caloosaensis
  - †Cerithium coccodes
  - †Cerithium cookei
  - †Cerithium dominicense
  - †Cerithium eburneum
  - †Cerithium georgianum – or unidentified related form
  - †Cerithium glaphyrea
  - †Cerithium guinaicum
  - †Cerithium harveyensis
  - †Cerithium hernandoensis
  - †Cerithium insulatum
  - †Cerithium litharium
  - †Cerithium lutosum
  - †Cerithium muscarum
  - †Cerithium obesum
  - †Cerithium ornatissimum
  - †Cerithium plectrum
  - †Cerithium praecursor
  - †Cerithium suwannensis
  - †Cerithium turriculum
- Cerodrillia
  - †Cerodrillia simpsoni
- †Certhioclava
  - †Certhioclava garciai
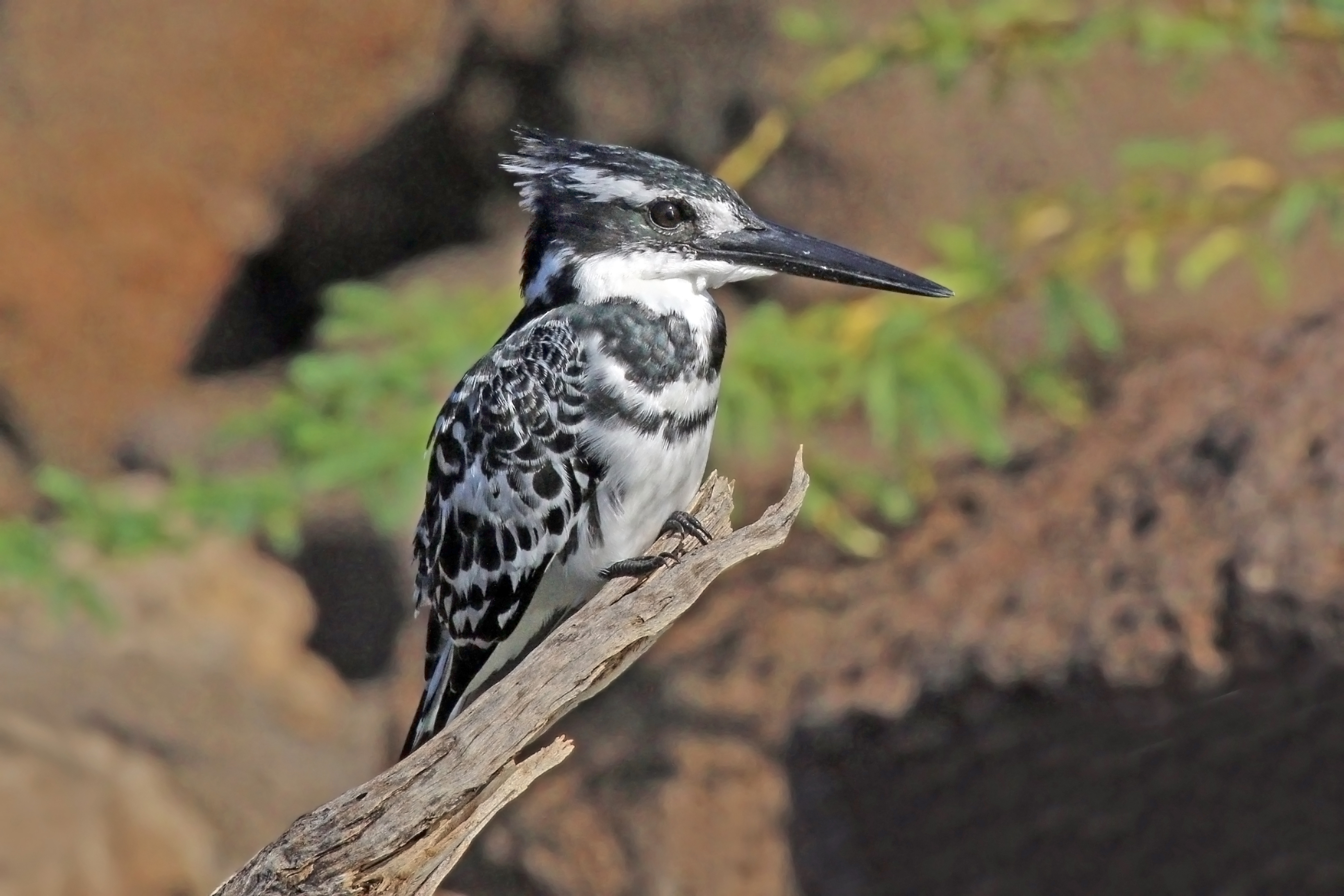
- A living Ceryle rudis, or pied kingfisher
  Ceryle
  - †Ceryle torquata
- †Cestumcerithium
  - †Cestumcerithium brooksvillensis
  - †Cestumcerithium liveoakensis
  - †Cestumcerithium pascoensis
  - †Cestumcerithium vaginatum
- Chaetopleura
  - †Chaetopleura apiculata
- Chama
  - †Chama caloosana
  - †Chama congregata
  - †Chama corticosa
  - †Chama gardnerae
  - †Chama heilprini
  - †Chama hillsboroughensis
  - †Chama macerophylla
  - †Chama radians
  - †Chama spinosa
  - †Chama tampaensis
  - †Chama willcoxii
- Chamelea
  - †Chamelea rhodia
  - †Chamelea spada
- Charadrius
  - †Charadrius vociferus
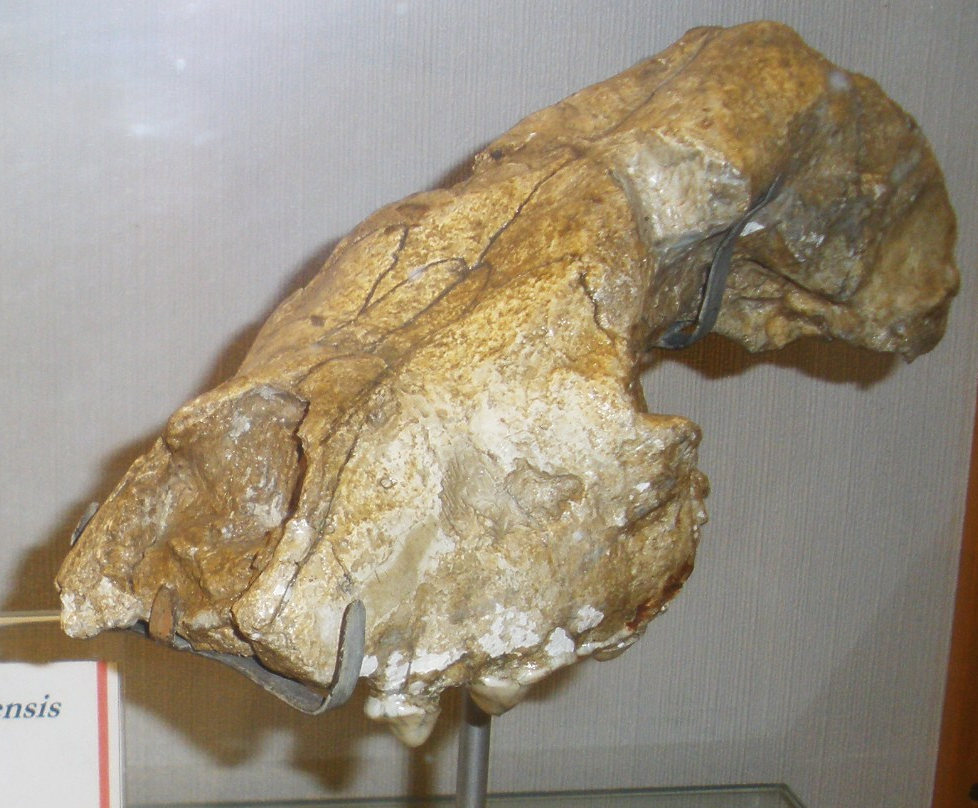
- Fossilized cranium of the Pliocene-Pleistocene hyena Chasmaporthetes
  †Chasmaporthetes
  - †Chasmaporthetes ossifragus
- Cheilea
  - †Cheilea uncinata – type locality for species
- Cheiloporina
  - †Cheiloporina bellensis – type locality for species
  - †Cheiloporina saillans
- Chelonia
  - †Chelonia mydas
- Chelonibia
  - †Chelonibia patula
  - †Chelonibia testudinaria
- Chelydra
  - †Chelydra floridana
  - †Chelydra sculpta
  - †Chelydra serpentina
- Chemnitzia
- †Chesacardium
  - †Chesacardium laqueatum
- †Chesaconcavus
  - †Chesaconcavus tamiamiensis
- †Chesapecten
  - †Chesapecten decemnarius
  - †Chesapecten jeffersonius
  - †Chesapecten madisonius
  - †Chesapecten middlesexensis
  - †Chesapecten palmyrensis
- Chicoreus
  - †Chicoreus aldrichi – type locality for species
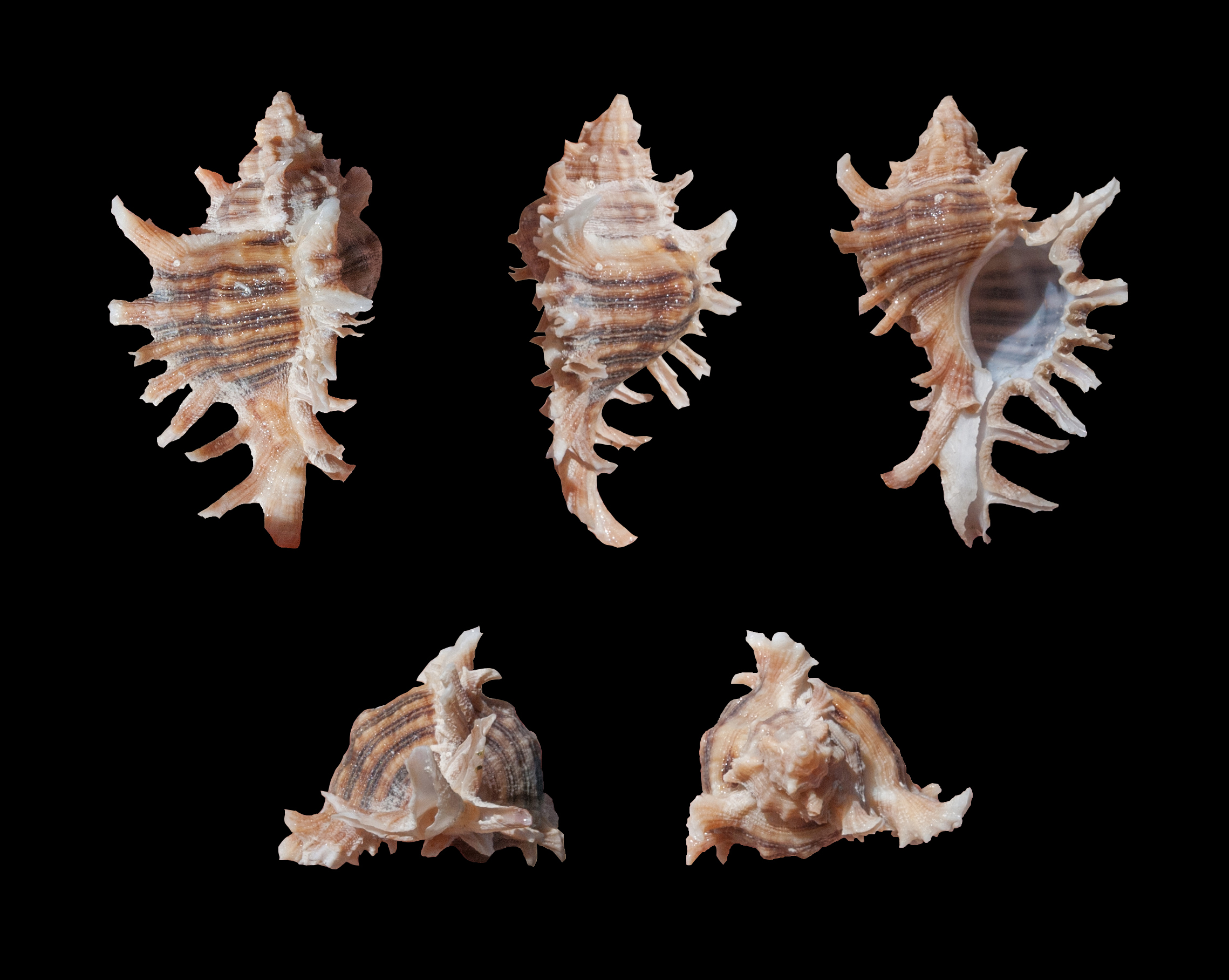
  - Shell in multiple views of a Chicoreus brevifrons, or West Indian murex
    †Chicoreus brevifrons
  - †Chicoreus brevis
  - †Chicoreus burnsii
  - †Chicoreus calusa
  - †Chicoreus chipolanus
  - †Chicoreus cornurectus
  - †Chicoreus dilectus
  - †Chicoreus duerri
  - †Chicoreus dujardinoides
  - †Chicoreus elusivus
  - †Chicoreus floridanus
  - †Chicoreus floridensis
  - †Chicoreus folidodes – type locality for species
  - †Chicoreus gravesae
  - †Chicoreus judeae
  - †Chicoreus juliagardnerae – type locality for species
  - †Chicoreus lepidotus
  - †Chicoreus miccosukee
  - †Chicoreus nicholsi
  - †Chicoreus pyknos
  - †Chicoreus sarae
  - †Chicoreus shirleyae
  - †Chicoreus stephensae
  - †Chicoreus stetopus
  - †Chicoreus susanae
  - †Chicoreus xestos
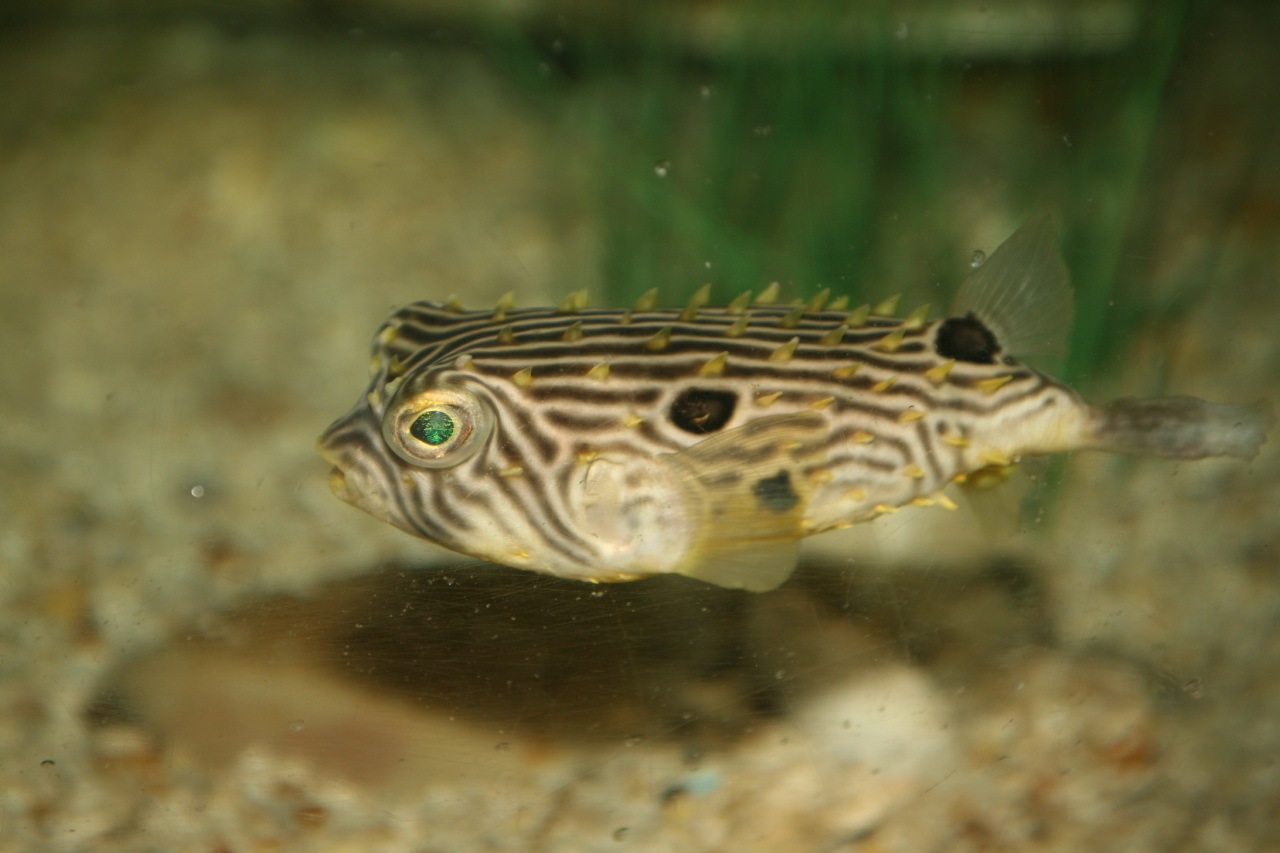
- A living Chilomycterus, or burrfish
  Chilomycterus
- Chione
  - †Chione ballista
  - †Chione burnsii
  - †Chione cancellata
  - †Chione chipolana
  - †Chione cortinaria
  - †Chione cribaria
  - †Chione cribraria
  - †Chione elevata
  - †Chione erosa
  - †Chione gardnerae
  - †Chione interpurpurea
  - †Chione moristans
  - †Chione morsitans
  - †Chione nuciformis
  - †Chione procancellata
- Chionopsis
  - †Chionopsis bainbridgensis
  - †Chionopsis intapurpurea
  - †Chionopsis spenceri – or unidentified comparable form
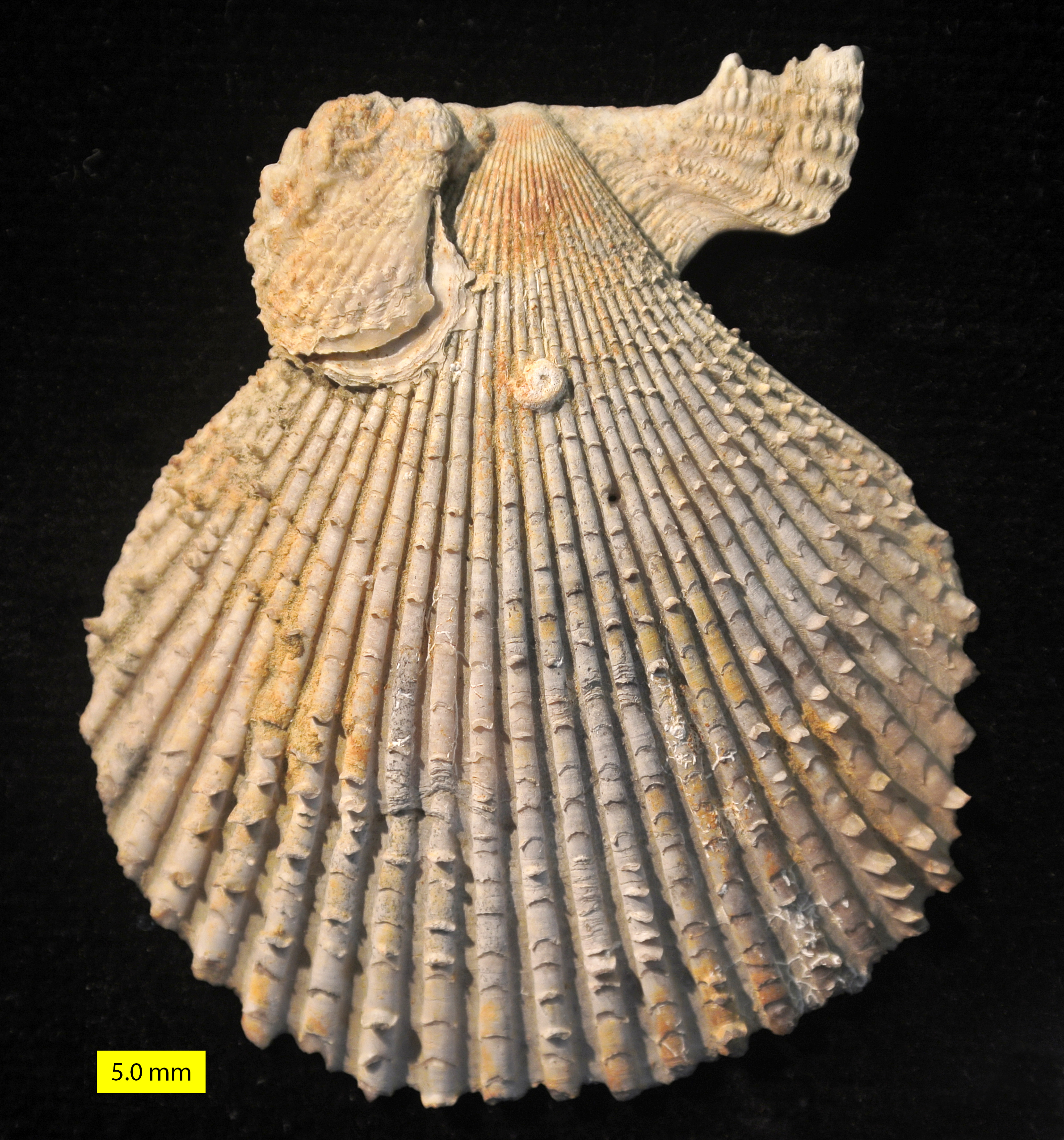
- Fossillized shell of a Chlamys bivalve
  Chlamys
  - †Chlamys anatipes
  - †Chlamys brooksvillensis
  - †Chlamys buckinghamensis
  - †Chlamys caloosensis
  - †Chlamys clinchfieldensis
  - †Chlamys condylomatus
  - †Chlamys crocus
  - †Chlamys eboreus
  - †Chlamys indecisa
  - †Chlamys liveoakensis
  - †Chlamys nematopleura
  - †Chlamys nicholsi – type locality for species
  - †Chlamys nupera
  - †Chlamys sayanus
  - †Chlamys solarioides
  - †Chlamys spillmani
  - †Chlamys vaun – or unidentified related form
- Chlorostoma
  - †Chlorostoma exoletus
  - †Chlorostoma exolutum
- Chondestes – or unidentified comparable form
  - †Chondestes grammacus
- Choristodon
  - †Choristodon robustus
- Chrysallida
  - †Chrysallida locklini – or unidentified comparable form
  - †Chrysallida macneili
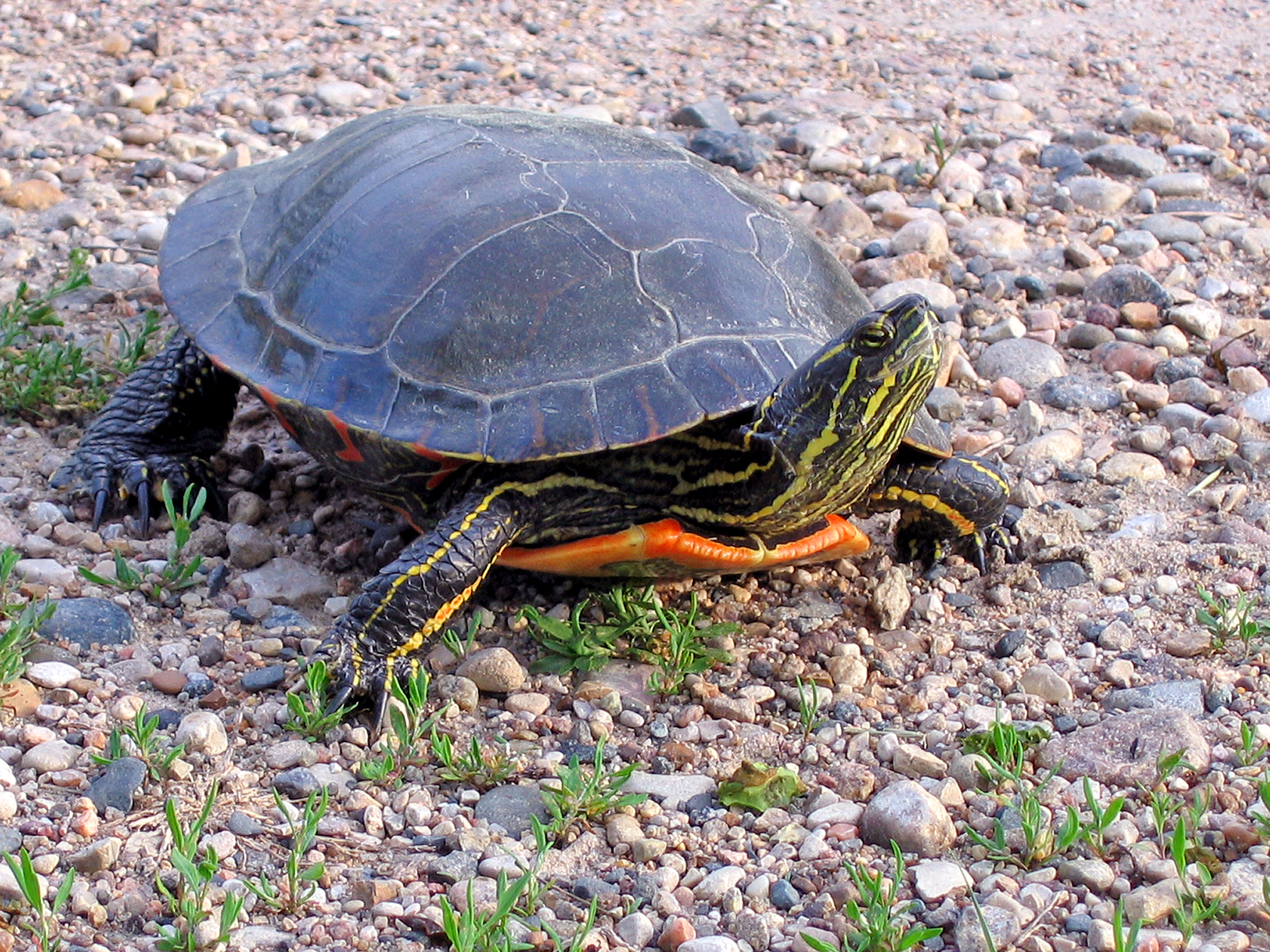
- A living Chrysemys picta, or painted turtle
  Chrysemys
  - †Chrysemys floridana
  - †Chrysemys nelsoni
  - †Chrysemys scripta
  - †Chrysemys williamsi
- Cibicides
  - †Cibicides concentricus
  - †Cibicides deprimus
  - †Cibicides floridanus
  - †Cibicides lobatulus
  - †Cibicides mississippiensis
- Ciconia
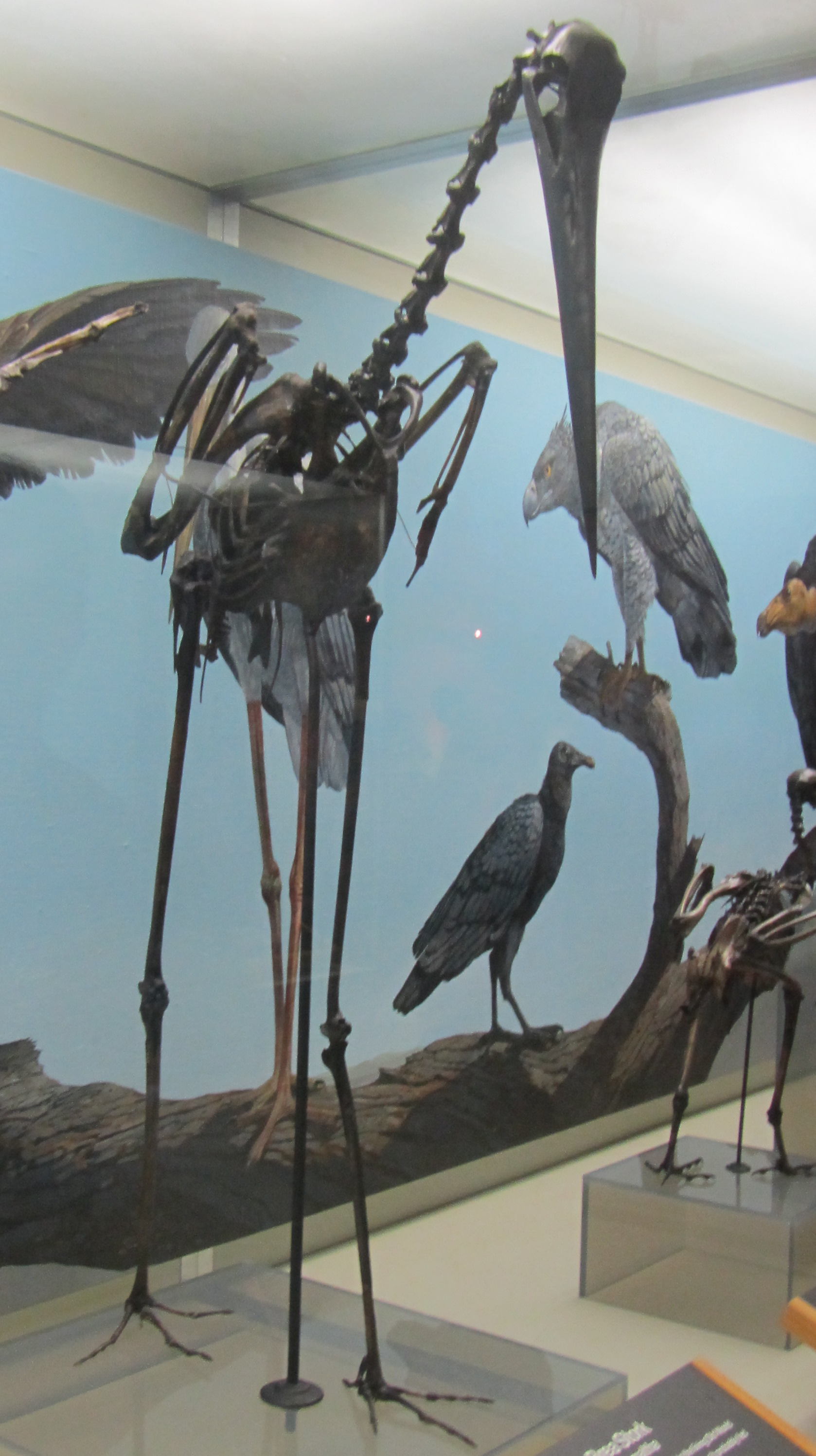
  - Mounted fossilized skeleton of the Pliocene-Pleistocene Ciconia maltha, also known as the asphalt stork or La Brea stork
    †Ciconia maltha
- Cidaris
  - †Cidaris mortoni
- Cinctura
  - †Cinctura capelettii
  - †Cinctura evergladensis
  - †Cinctura holeylandica
  - †Cinctura hunteria
  - †Cinctura lilium
  - †Cinctura lindae
  - †Cinctura rhomboidea
  - †Cinctura rucksorum
  - †Cinctura sarasotaensis
- Circulus
  - †Circulus anthera – type locality for species
  - †Circulus gunteri
  - †Circulus mitorraphes – type locality for species
  - †Circulus trilix
- Circus
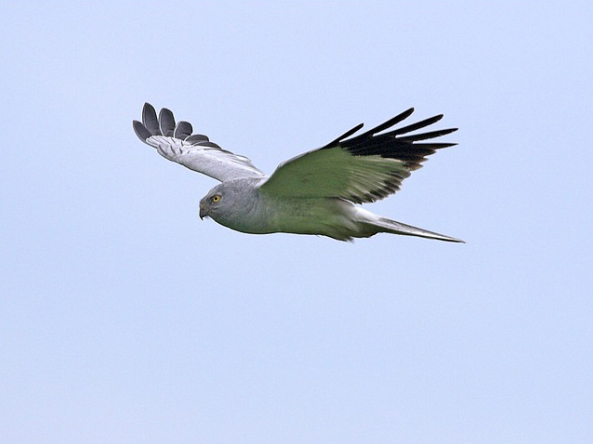
  - A living Circus cyaneus, or hen harrier
    †Circus cyaneus – or unidentified comparable form
- Cirsotrema
  - †Cirsotrema cirritum
  - †Cirsotrema dalli
- Cistothorus
  - †Cistothorus brevis
  - †Cistothorus platensis
- Cladocora
  - †Cladocora arbuscula
  - †Cladocora johnsoni
- Clangula
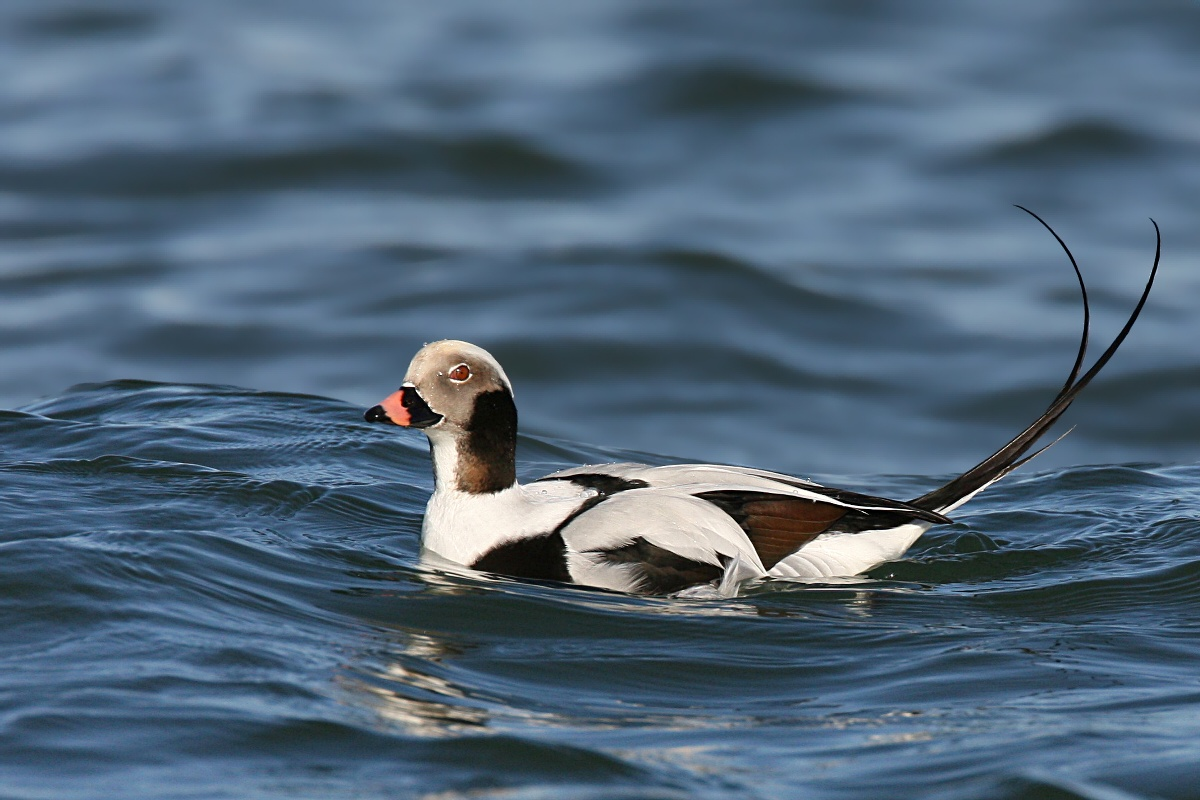
  - A living Clangula hyemalis, or long-tailed duck
    †Clangula hyemalis
- Clathrodrillia
  - †Clathrodrillia aulakoessa – type locality for species
  - †Clathrodrillia ebinina
  - †Clathrodrillia emmonsi
  - †Clathrodrillia empera – type locality for species
  - †Clathrodrillia gracilina
  - †Clathrodrillia perspirata – tentative report
  - †Clathrodrillia podagrina
  - †Clathrodrillia subvaricosa – type locality for species
- Clathrus
  - †Clathrus antillarum
  - †Clathrus junceum
  - †Clathrus obtusum
  - †Clathrus rupicolum
- Clava
  - †Clava menthafontis
  - †Clava silicium
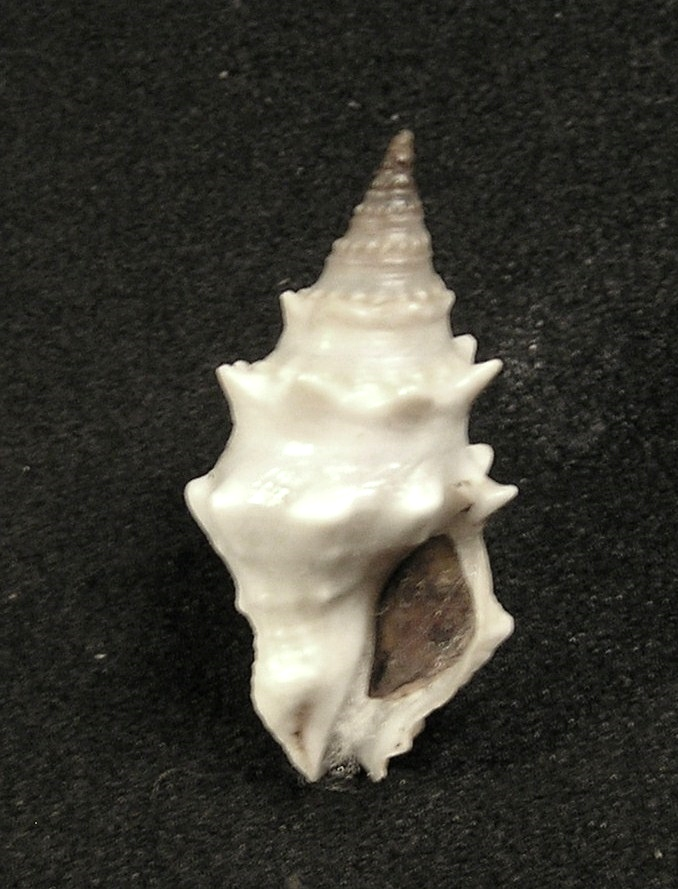
- Shell of a Clavatula sea snail
  Clavatula
  - †Clavatula anthera – type locality for species
  - †Clavatula apoia
  - †Clavatula compsa – type locality for species
  - †Clavatula elatocompsa – type locality for species
  - †Clavatula eleutheria – type locality for species
  - †Clavatula euparypha – type locality for species
  - †Clavatula grabaui
  - †Clavatula gunteri – type locality for species
  - †Clavatula habra – type locality for species
  - †Clavatula kalliglypta – type locality for species
  - †Clavatula libertalis – type locality for species
  - †Clavatula panopla – type locality for species
  - †Clavatula polyploka – type locality for species
  - †Clavatula proebenina – type locality for species
  - †Clavatula vandenbroecki
- †Clavolithes
  - †Clavolithes vicksburgensis
- Clavus
  - †Clavus blacki
  - †Clavus centrodes – type locality for species
  - †Clavus coryphodes – type locality for species
  - †Clavus eurysoma – type locality for species
  - †Clavus eurystoma
  - †Clavus haraldi – type locality for species
  - †Clavus illiota
  - †Clavus lunata
  - †Clavus microneta – type locality for species
  - †Clavus pachycheila
  - †Clavus pleutonica – or unidentified related form
  - †Clavus pogodula
  - †Clavus prion – type locality for species
  - †Clavus pycnoklosta – type locality for species
  - †Clavus silfa
  - †Clavus trimitrodita – type locality for species
  - †Clavus trypanion – type locality for species
  - †Clavus waltoniana – type locality for species
  - †Clavus zosta – type locality for species
- Clementia
  - †Clementia grayi
  - †Clementia inoceriformis
- Clidiophora
  - †Clidiophora crassidens – or unidentified comparable form
- †Climacoida
- Climacoidea
  - †Climacoidea pleurata
- Closia
  - †Closia antiqua
  - †Closia popenoei
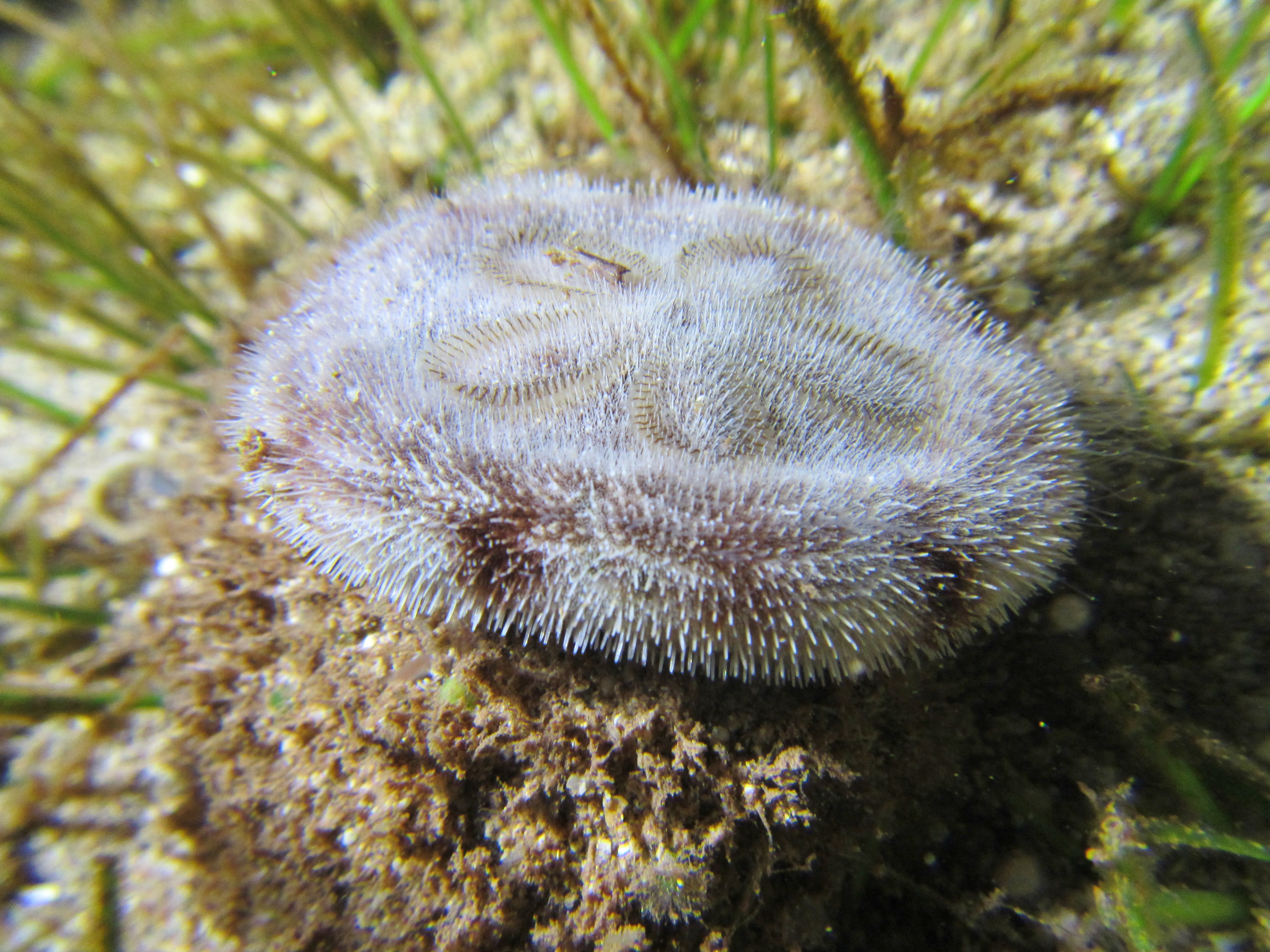
- A living Clypeaster, or sea biscuit
  Clypeaster
  - †Clypeaster cotteaui
  - †Clypeaster oxybaphon
  - †Clypeaster rogersi
  - †Clypeaster rosaceus
  - †Clypeaster sunnilandensis
- Cnemidophorus
  - †Cnemidophorus sexlineatus
- Coccyzus
  - †Coccyzus americanus
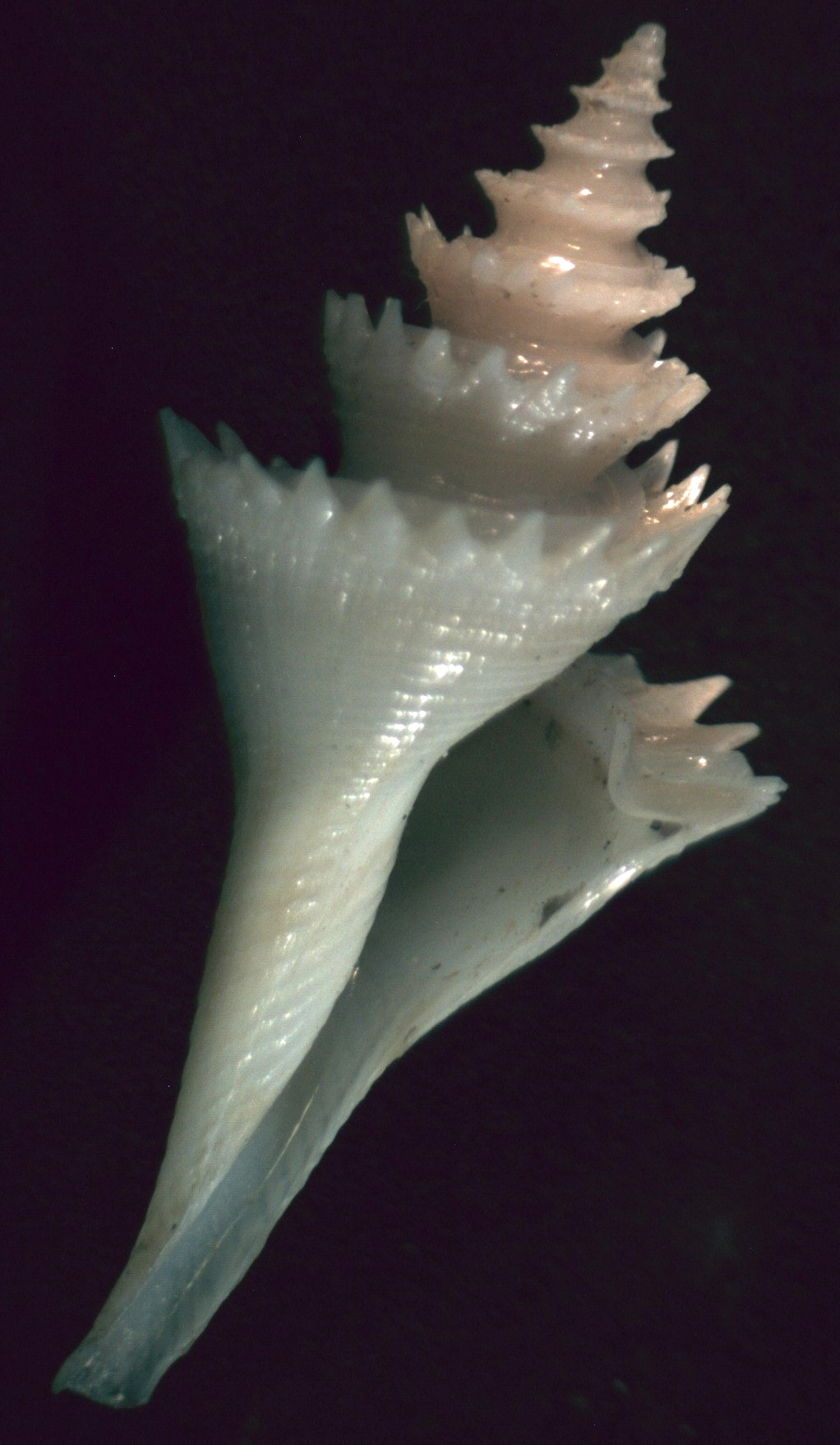
- Shell of a Cochlespira sea snail
  Cochlespira
- †Cochliolepas
- Cochliolepis
  - †Cochliolepis arietina – type locality for species
  - †Cochliolepis holmesi
  - †Cochliolepis nautiformis
  - †Cochliolepis striata
- Codakia
  - †Codakia chipolana
  - †Codakia erosa – or unidentified related form
  - †Codakia orbicularis
- Colaptes
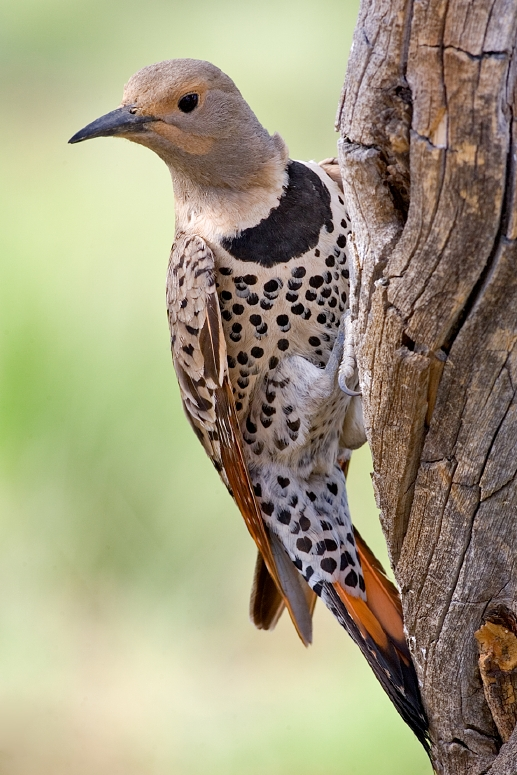
  - A living Colaptes auratus, or northern flicker
    †Colaptes auratus
- Colinus
  - †Colinus suilium – type locality for species
  - †Colinus virginianus
- †Collinus
- Colpophyllia
  - †Colpophyllia natans
- Coluber
  - †Coluber constrictor
- Columba
  - †Columba fasciata
- Columbella
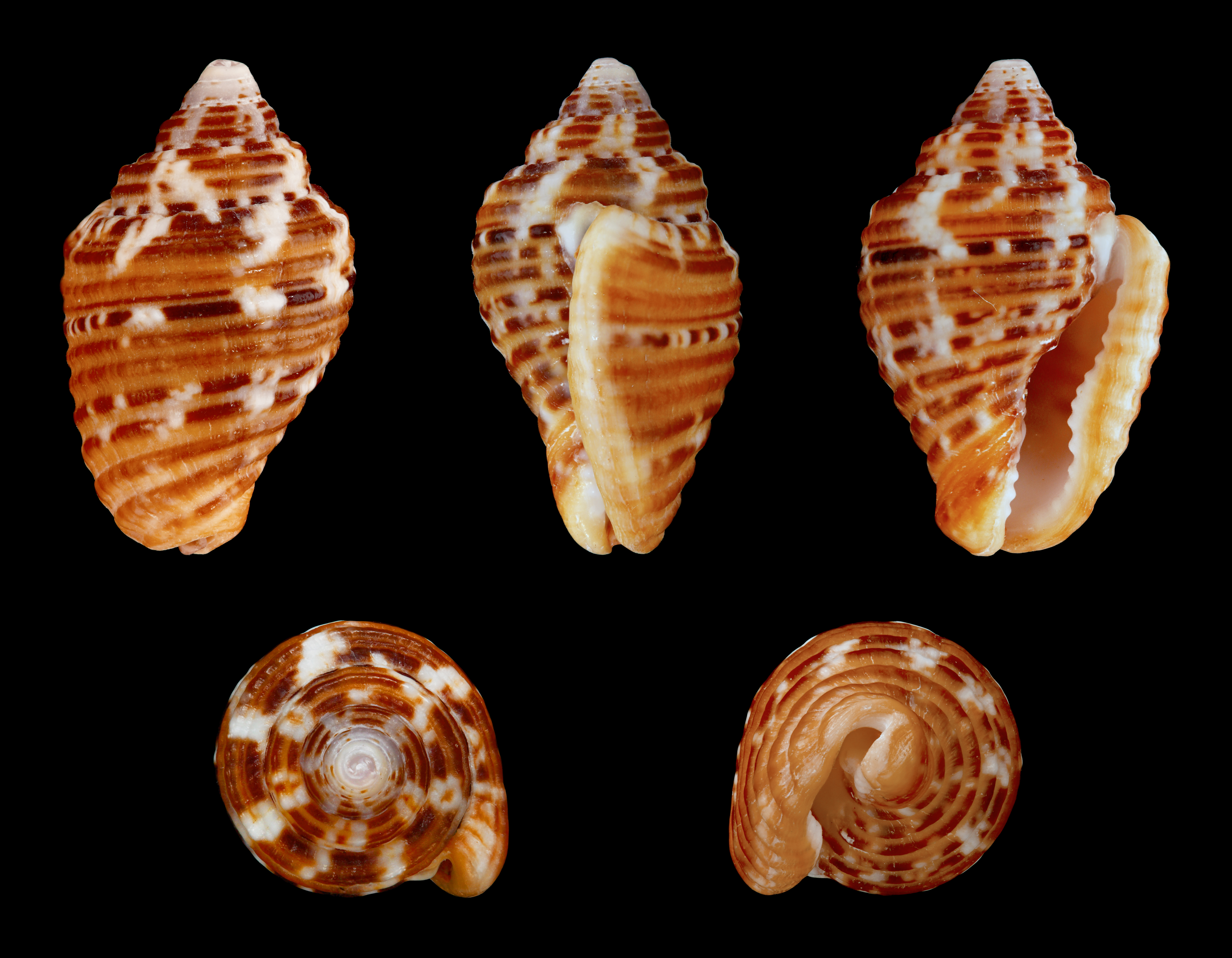
  - Shell in multiple views of Columbella mercatoria dove sea snails
    †Columbella mercatoria
  - †Columbella rusticoides
  - †Columbella submercatoria
- Columbellopsis
  - †Columbellopsis nycteis – or unidentified comparable form
- Compsodrillia
  - †Compsodrillia calesi
  - †Compsodrillia drewi
  - †Compsodrillia lipana
- †Conantophis – type locality for genus
  - †Conantophis alachuaensis – type locality for species
- Concavus
  - †Concavus concavus
  - †Concavus crassostricola
  - †Concavus sarasotaensis
- †Concholepas
  - †Concholepas drezi – type locality for species
- Conepatus
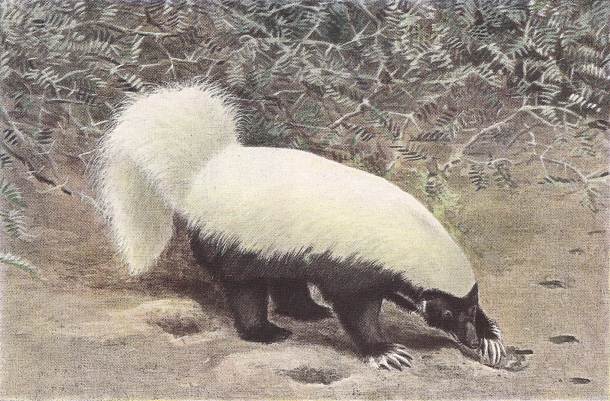
  - Illustration of a living Conepatus leuconotus, or American hog-nosed skunk
    †Conepatus leuconotus
  - †Conepatus robustus – type locality for species
- Conomitra
  - †Conomitra angulata
  - †Conomitra apalachee – type locality for species
  - †Conomitra crenulata
  - †Conomitra kendrewi
  - †Conomitra staminea
- †Conorbis
  - †Conorbis porcellanus
- †Conradostrea
  - †Conradostrea lawrencei
  - †Conradostrea sculpturata
  - †Conradostrea scuplturata
- Conus
  - †Conus adversarius
  - †Conus alleni
  - †Conus ambonos
  - †Conus anabathrum
  - †Conus aneuretos – type locality for species
  - †Conus aquoreus – type locality for species
  - †Conus chipolanus
  - †Conus cookei
  - †Conus corrugatus – type locality for species
  - †Conus daucus
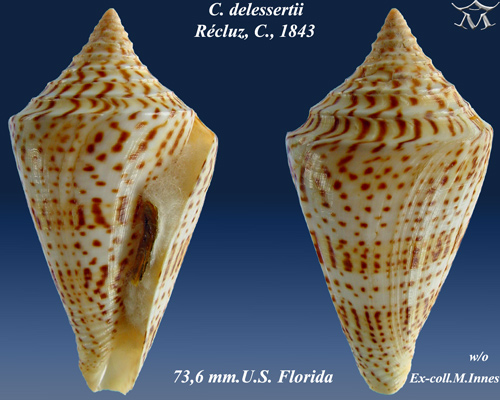
  - Shell in multiple views of a Conasprella delessertii (formerly Conus delessertii), or Sozon's cone sea snail

†Conus delessertii

  - †Conus deluvianus
  - †Conus demiurgus
  - †Conus designatus
  - †Conus dodona – type locality for species
  - †Conus drezi
  - †Conus drezki – type locality for species
  - †Conus duidi
  - †Conus erugatus – type locality for species
  - †Conus evergladensis
  - †Conus eversoni – or unidentified comparable form
  - †Conus fusiformis – type locality for species
  - †Conus gardnerae – type locality for species
  - †Conus harveyensis
  - †Conus hertwecki
  - †Conus hyshugari
  - †Conus iliolus
  - †Conus imitator – or unidentified related form
  - †Conus infulatus
  - †Conus isomatratus
  - †Conus isomitratus
  - †Conus jaclynae
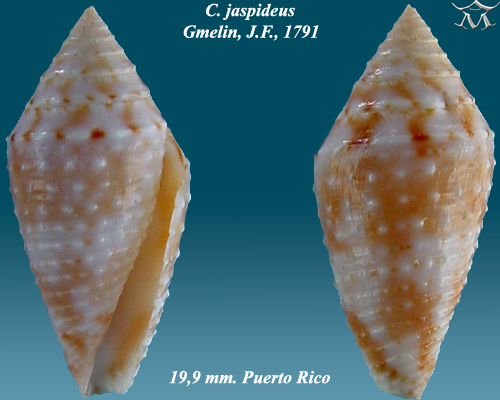
  - Shell in multiple views of a Conasprella jaspidea (formerly Conus jaspideus), or jasper cone sea snail
    †Conus jaspideus – type locality for species
  - †Conus jonesorum
  - †Conus kendrewi
  - †Conus largillierti
  - †Conus laurenae
  - †Conus martinshugari
  - †Conus marylandicus
  - †Conus marysmansfieldae
  - †Conus maureenae
  - †Conus miamiensis
  - †Conus molis
  - †Conus nemorideditus – type locality for species
  - †Conus palmbeachensis
  - †Conus palmerae
  - †Conus parkeri
  - †Conus patglicksteinae
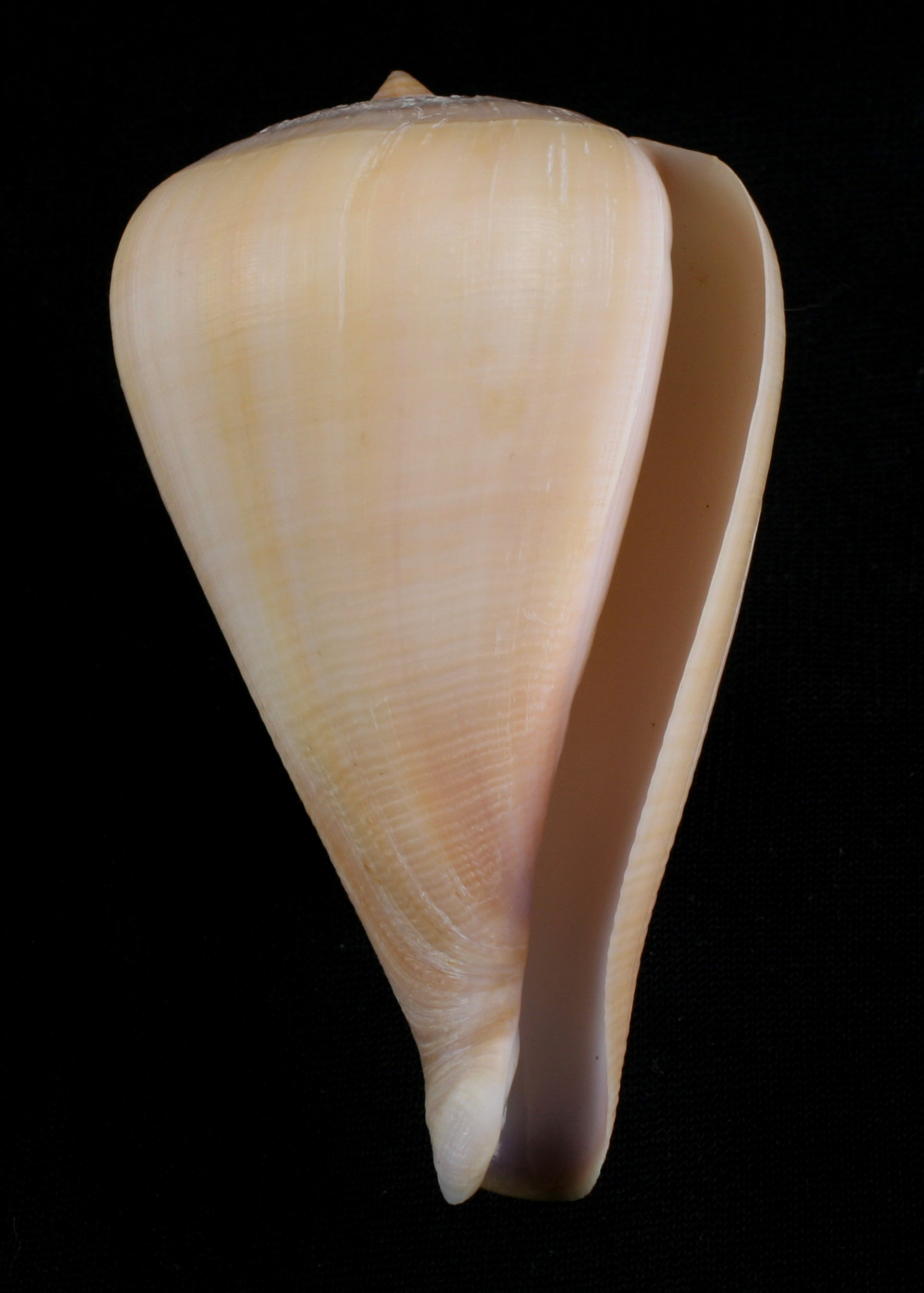
  - Shell in multiple views of a Conus patricius, or patrician cone sea snail
    †Conus patricius
  - †Conus phluegeri
  - †Conus planiceps
  - †Conus praecipuus
  - †Conus rapunculus – type locality for species
  - †Conus robertsi
  - †Conus ronaldsmithi
  - †Conus sauridens – type locality for species
  - †Conus sennottorum
  - †Conus sextoni – type locality for species
  - †Conus spurius
  - †Conus spuroides
  - †Conus submoniliferus – type locality for species
  - †Conus sulculus
  - †Conus suproides
  - †Conus tapetus
  - †Conus trajectionis – type locality for species
  - †Conus tricoratus – type locality for species
  - †Conus vegrandis
  - †Conus vitius – type locality for species
  - †Conus waccamawensis
  - †Conus waltonensis – type locality for species
  - †Conus yaquensis
- †Copemys
- Coragyps
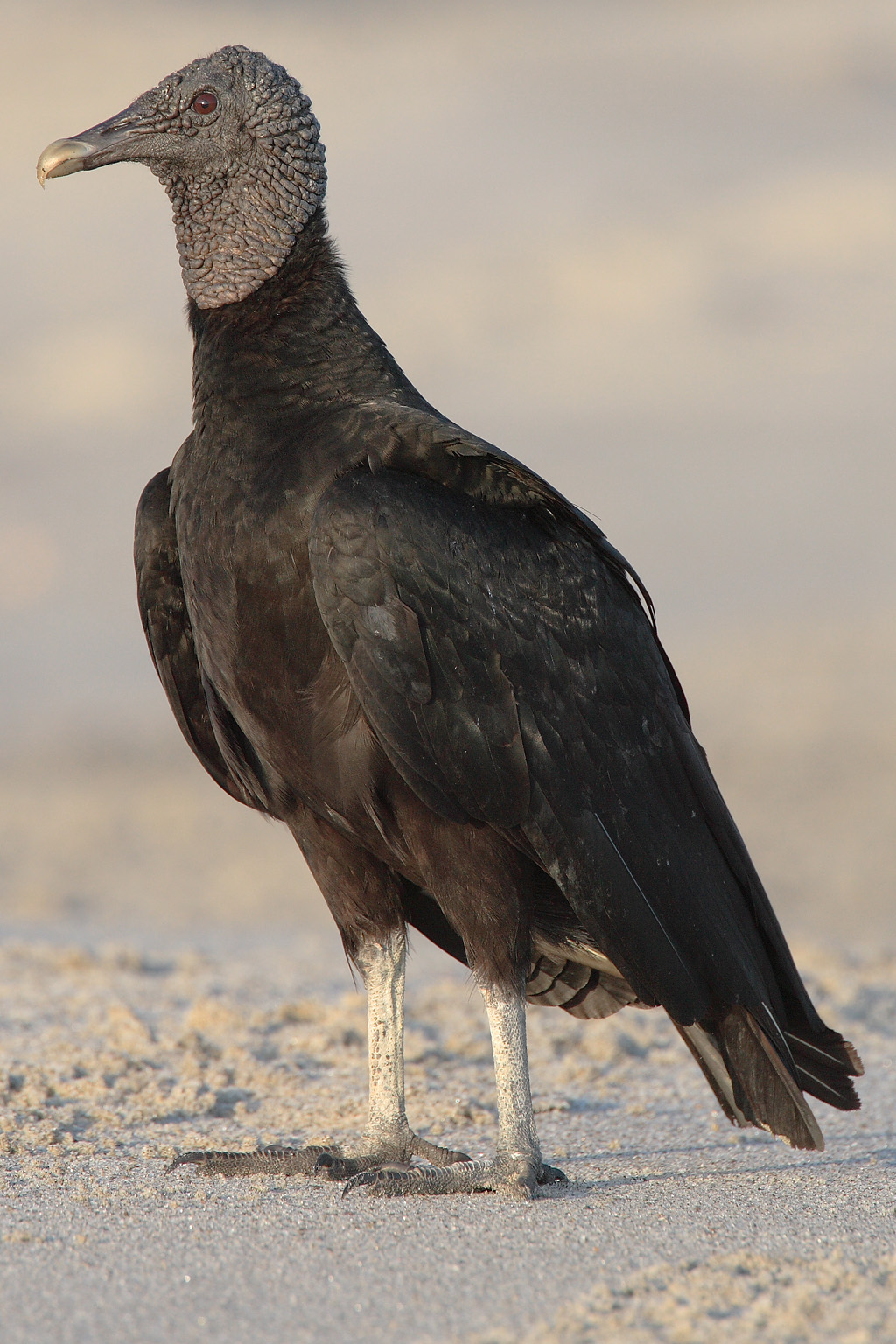
  - A living Coragyps atratus, or American black vulture
    †Coragyps atratus
  - †Coragyps attratus
  - †Coragyps occidentalis
  - †Coragyps urubu
- Coralliophaga
  - †Coralliophaga coralliophaga
  - †Coralliophaga elegantula
- Coralliophila
  - †Coralliophila magna
  - †Coralliophila mansfieldi
  - †Coralliophila miocenica
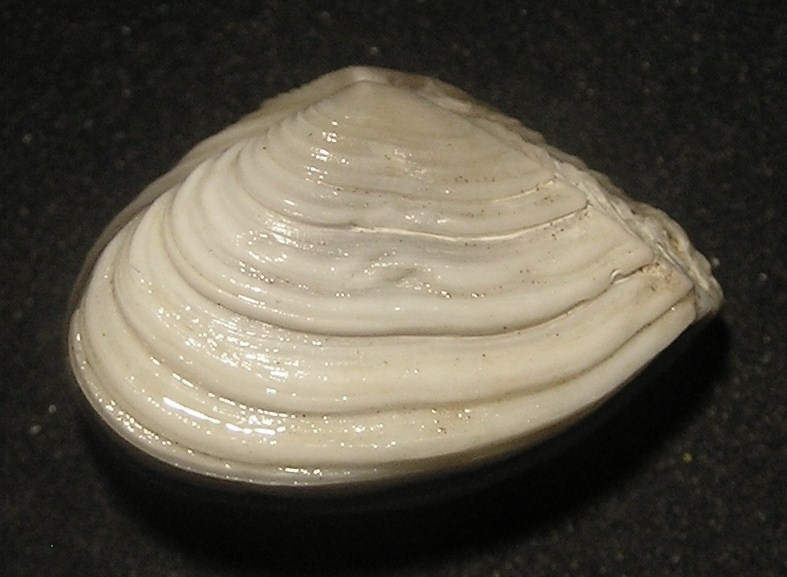
- Shell of a Corbula basket clam
  Corbula
  - †Corbula anteniae
  - †Corbula burnsii
  - †Corbula cala
  - †Corbula caloosae
  - †Corbula chipolana – type locality for species
  - †Corbula franci – type locality for species
  - †Corbula funiakensis – type locality for species
  - †Corbula inaequalis
  - †Corbula kaghriana
  - †Corbula krebsiana
  - †Corbula nucleata
  - †Corbula parawhitfieldi – type locality for species
  - †Corbula sarda
  - †Corbula semenoides – type locality for species
  - †Corbula seminella
  - †Corbula sphenia
  - †Corbula wakullensis – type locality for species
  - †Corbula waltonensis – type locality for species
- †Cormocyon
  - †Cormocyon copei – or unidentified comparable form
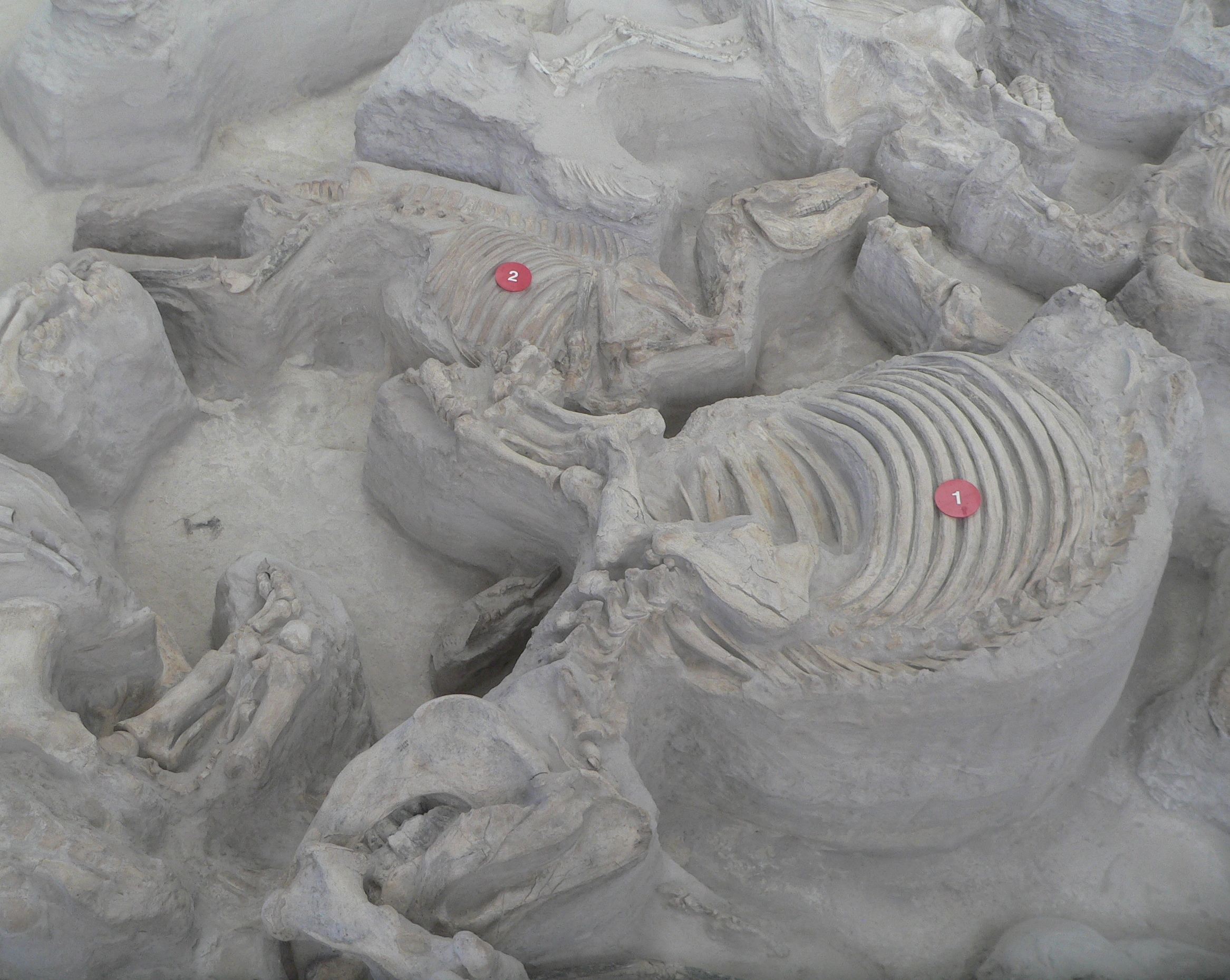
- Fossilized skeleton preserved in situ (upper left, 2) of the Miocene-Pliocene horse Cormohipparion
  †Cormohipparion
  - †Cormohipparion emsliei
  - †Cormohipparion goorisi
  - †Cormohipparion ingenuum
  - †Cormohipparion occidentale
  - †Cormohipparion plicatile
- Corvus
  - †Corvus brachyrhynchos
  - †Corvus ossifragus
- †Corylus
- †Corystosiren
  - †Corystosiren varguezi
- †Coskinolina
  - †Coskinolina floridana
- Cosmotriphora
  - †Cosmotriphora dupliniana
  - †Cosmotriphora melanura
- †Costaglycymeris
  - †Costaglycymeris drymanos – type locality for species
  - †Costaglycymeris subovata
  - †Costaglycymeris waltonensis – type locality for species
- Coturnicops
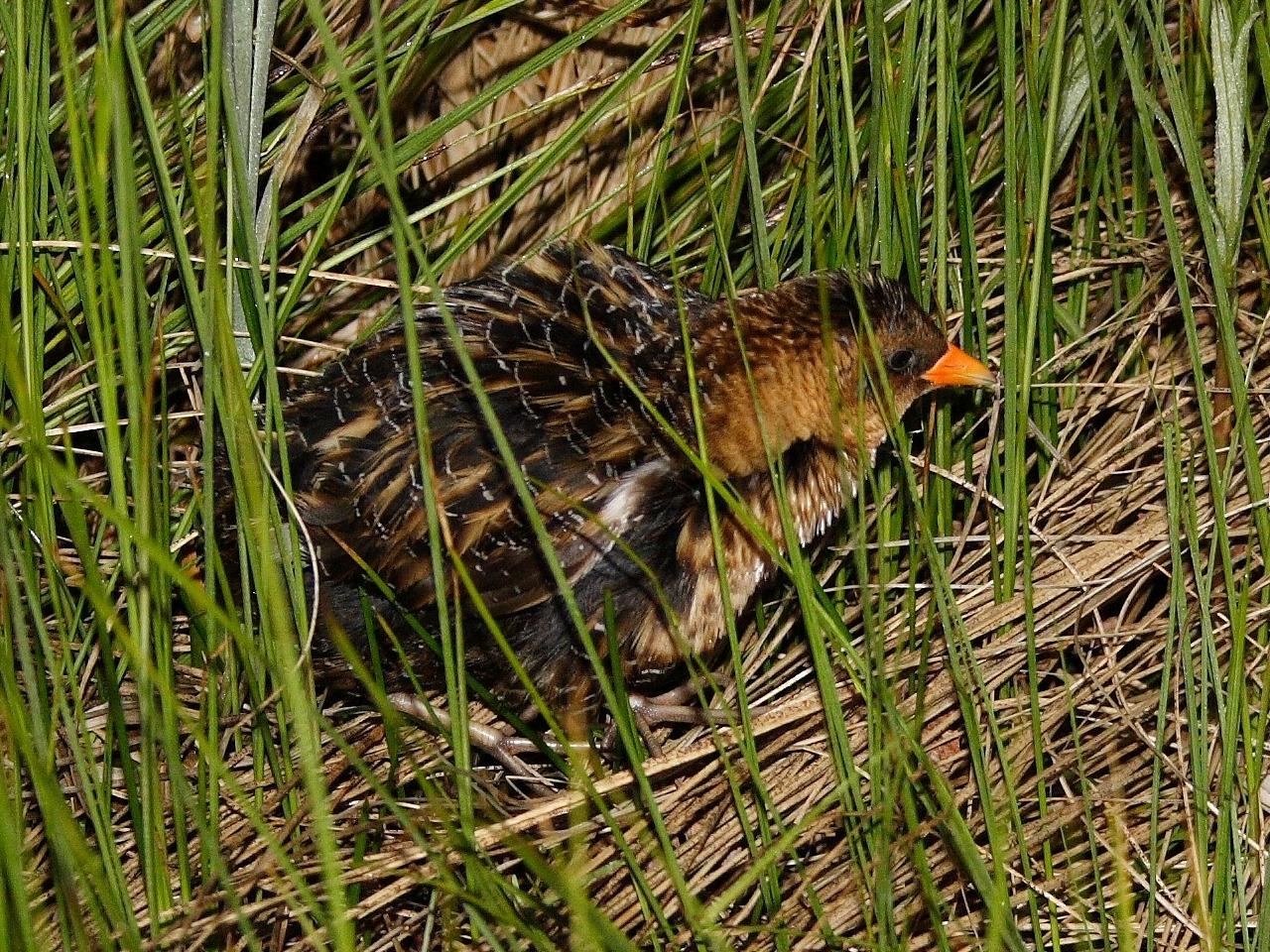
  - A living Coturnicops noveboracensis, or yellow rail
    †Coturnicops noveboracensis
- Crassatella
  - †Crassatella deformis
  - †Crassatella densus
  - †Crassatella eutawacolens
  - †Crassatella eutawcolens
  - †Crassatella inglisia – type locality for species
  - †Crassatella ocordia
  - †Crassatella porcus
  - †Crassatella portelli
  - †Crassatella tanicus
- Crassatellites
  - †Crassatellites meridionalis
- Crassimarginatella
  - †Crassimarginatella crassimarginata
- Crassinella
  - †Crassinella acuta
  - †Crassinella dupliniana
  - †Crassinella lunulata
  - †Crassinella tanica
  - †Crassinella tanicus
  - †Crassinella triangulatus
  - †Crassinella waltoniana
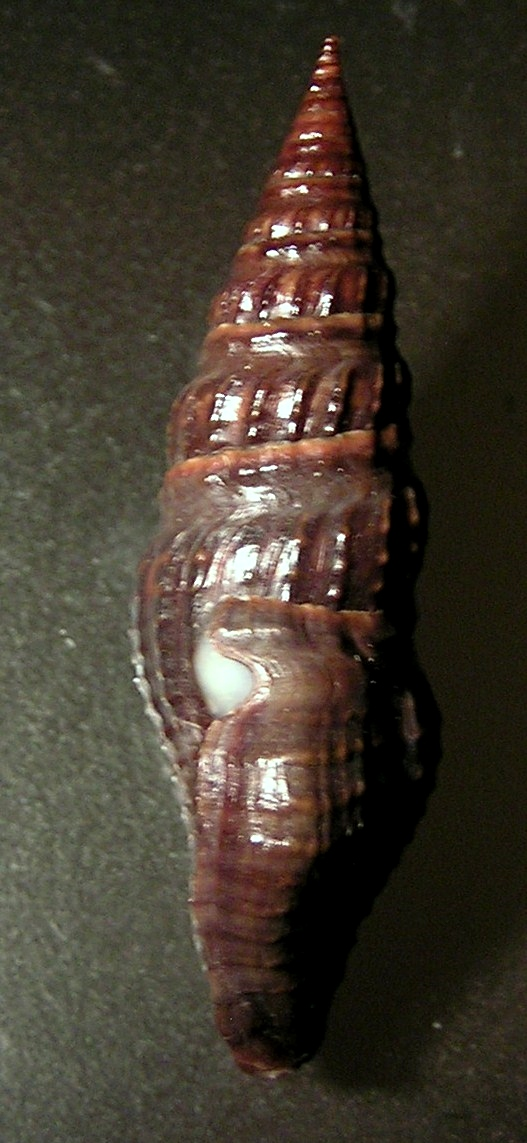
- Shell of a Crassispira sea snail
  Crassispira
  - †Crassispira boadicea
  - †Crassispira calligona
  - †Crassispira eupatoria
  - †Crassispira laurentii – type locality for species
  - †Crassispira loxa – type locality for species
  - †Crassispira lyopleura
  - †Crassispira meunieri
  - †Crassispira perrugata
  - †Crassispira sella
  - †Crassispira smilia
- Crassostrea
  - †Crassostrea labellensis
  - †Crassostrea normalis
  - †Crassostrea virginica
- †Cremaster – type locality for genus
- †Cremaster
  - †Cremaster tytthus – type locality for species
- †Crenatosiren – type locality for genus
  - †Crenatosiren olseni
- Crenella
  - †Crenella decussata
  - †Crenella minuscula
- Crepidula
  - †Crepidula aesop
  - †Crepidula cannoni
  - †Crepidula convexa
  - †Crepidula cymbaeformis
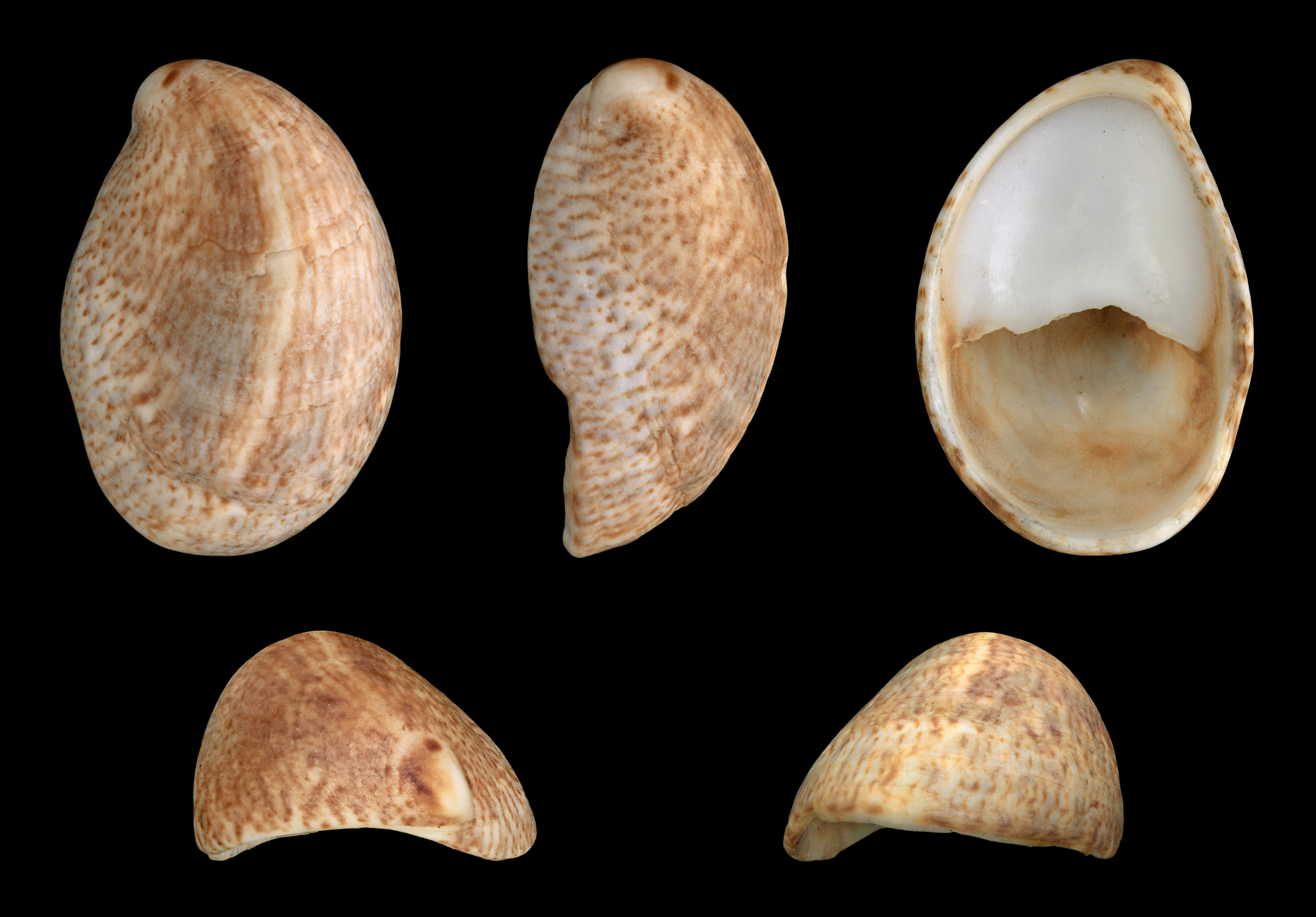
  - Shell in multiple views of a Crepidula fornicata, or common slipper shell sea snail
    †Crepidula fornicata
  - †Crepidula fornicula
  - †Crepidula maculosa
  - †Crepidula plana
  - †Crepidula ponderosa
  - †Crepidula rhysseama
  - †Crepidula rhyssema
  - †Crepidula rostrata
- Crepipatella
  - †Crepipatella apprimus
- †Creusia
  - †Creusia neogenica
- †Cribrendoecium
  - †Cribrendoecium tenuicostulatum
- †Crommium
  - †Crommium ocalanum
- Crotalus
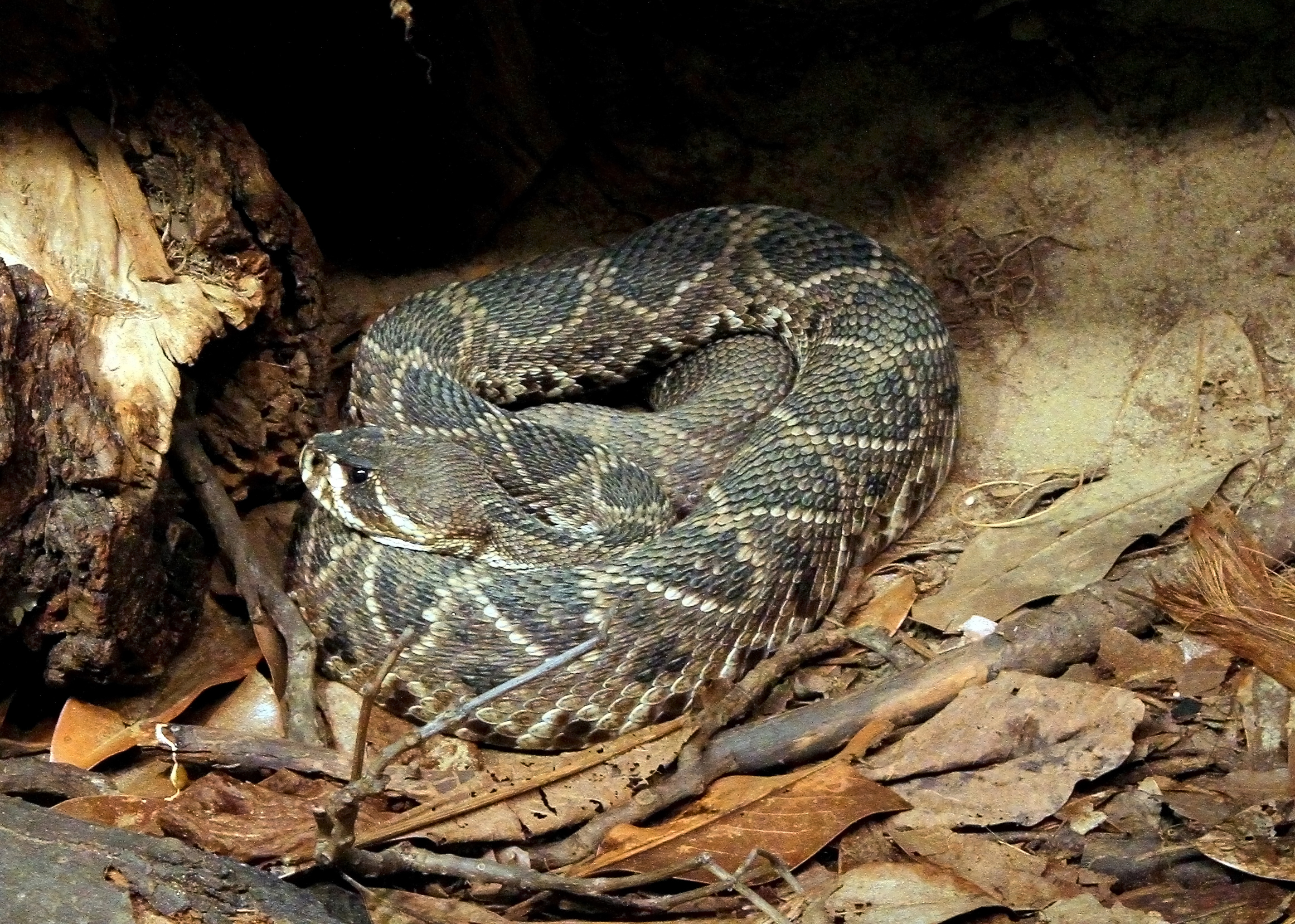
  - A living Crotalus adamanteus, or eastern diamondback rattlesnake
    †Crotalus adamanteus
  - †Crotalus giganteus
- Crucibulum
  - †Crucibulum auricula
  - †Crucibulum chipolanum
  - †Crucibulum constrictum
  - †Crucibulum costataum
  - †Crucibulum grande
  - †Crucibulum imbricatum
  - †Crucibulum multilineata
  - †Crucibulum multilineatum
  - †Crucibulum ramosum
  - †Crucibulum spinosum
  - †Crucibulum striata
  - †Crucibulum striatum
  - †Crucibulum waltonense – type locality for species
- Cryptotis
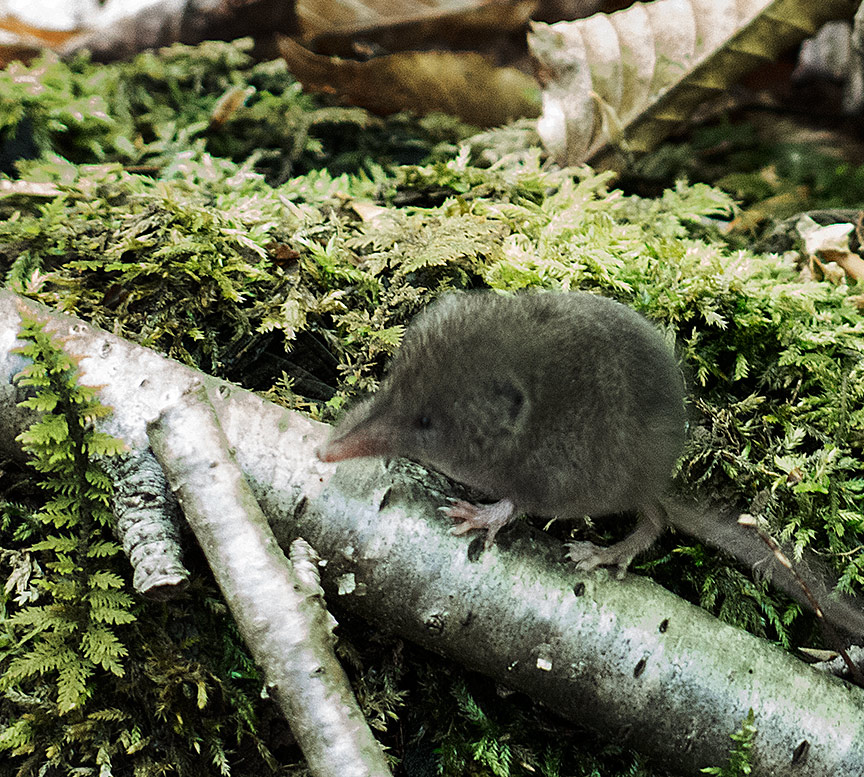
  - A living Cryptotis parva, or North American least shrew
    †Cryptotis parva
- †Cryrenoida
  - †Cryrenoida floridana
- Ctena
  - †Ctena chipolana
  - †Ctena erosa
  - †Ctena leonensis
  - †Ctena magnoliana
  - †Ctena orbiculata
  - †Ctena scurra
  - †Ctena speciosa
- Ctenoides
  - †Ctenoides floridana
  - †Ctenoides scabra
- †Cubitostrea
  - †Cubitostrea pauciplicata
  - †Cubitostrea rugifera
- Cumingia
  - †Cumingia amydra
  - †Cumingia lamellosa
  - †Cumingia tellinoides
- †Cuneocorbula
  - †Cuneocorbula whitfieldi
- Cupuladria
  - †Cupuladria biporosa
- Cupularia
  - †Cupularia denticulata
- Cuvierina
  - †Cuvierina columnella
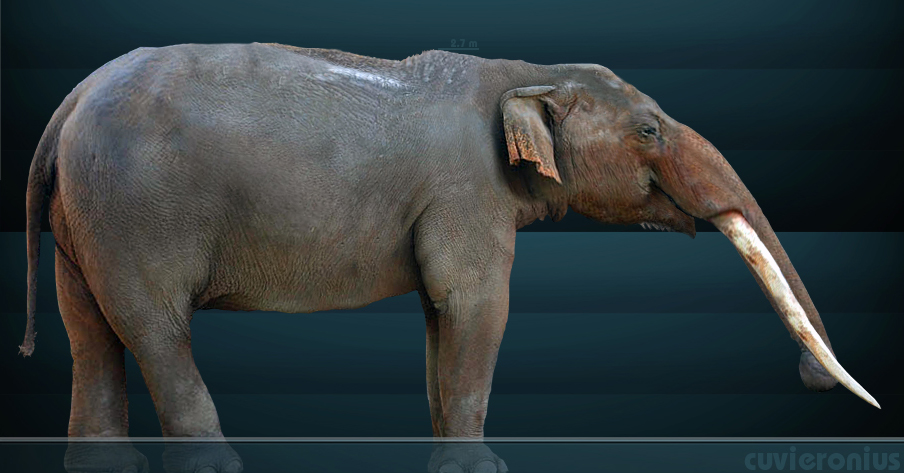
- Life restoration of the Pliocene-Holocene elephant relative Cuvieronius
  †Cuvieronius
  - †Cuvieronius tropicus
- Cyanocitta
  - †Cyanocitta cristata
- Cyclinella
  - †Cyclinella tenuis
- Cyclocardia
  - †Cyclocardia granulata
- Cyclopecten
  - †Cyclopecten defuniak – type locality for species
  - †Cyclopecten diktuotus – type locality for species
- Cyclostremiscus
  - †Cyclostremiscus anthera
  - †Cyclostremiscus bartschi
  - †Cyclostremiscus beaui
  - †Cyclostremiscus beauii
  - †Cyclostremiscus fargoi
  - †Cyclostremiscus gunteri
  - †Cyclostremiscus mitorraphes
  - †Cyclostremiscus olssoni
  - †Cyclostremiscus pentagonus
  - †Cyclostremiscus stirophorus
  - †Cyclostremiscus trilex – tentative report
  - †Cyclostremiscus trilix
- Cygnus
  - †Cygnus buccinator
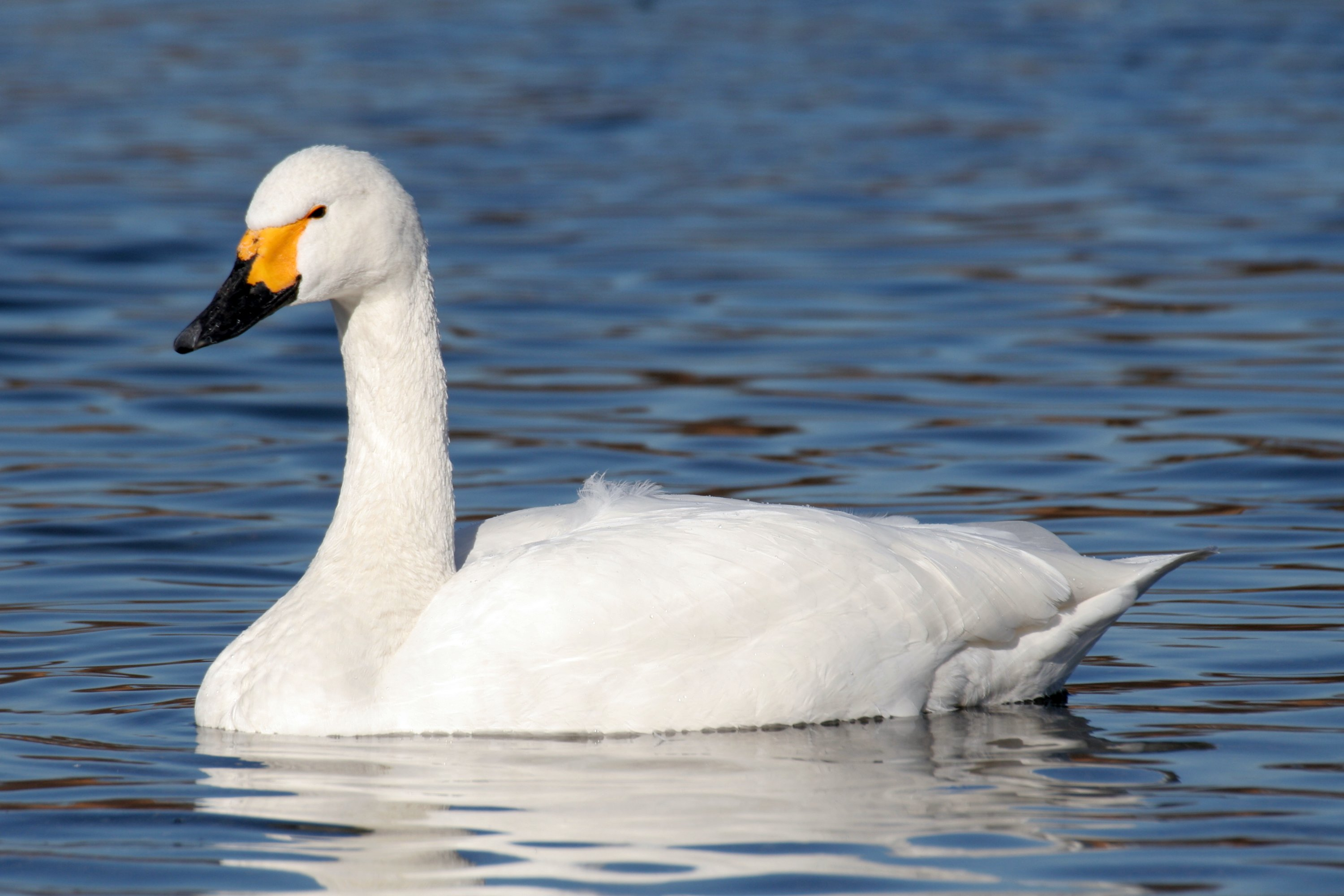
  - A living Cygnus columbianus, or tundra swan
    †Cygnus columbianus
- Cylichna
  - †Cylichna anthera – type locality for species
  - †Cylichna decapitata
  - †Cylichna quercinensis
- Cylichnella
  - †Cylichnella bidentata
  - †Cylichnella biplicata
  - †Cylichnella gabbi
  - †Cylichnella jacksonensis
- †Cymakra
  - †Cymakra poncei
- Cymatium
- Cymatoica
  - †Cymatoica orientalis
- Cymatophos
  - †Cymatophos lindae
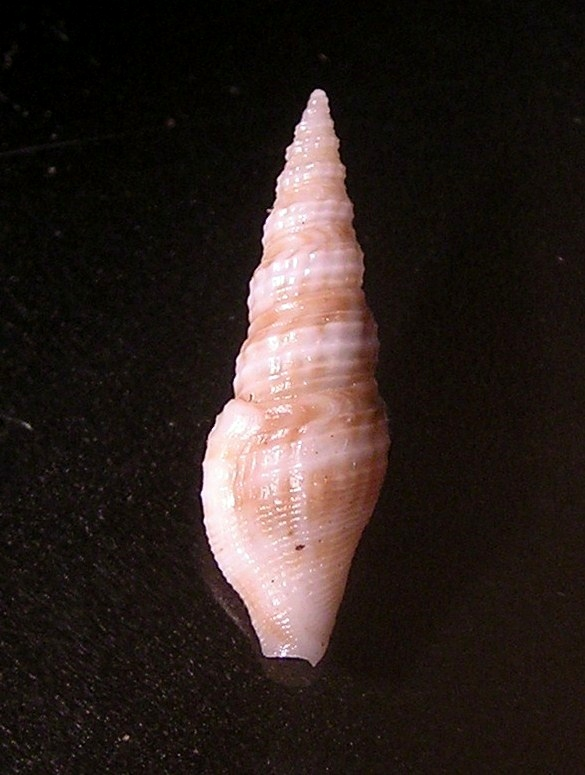
- Shell of a Cymatosyrinx sea snail
  Cymatosyrinx
  - †Cymatosyrinx aclinica
  - †Cymatosyrinx louisae – or unidentified comparable form
  - †Cymatosyrinx lunata
  - †Cymatosyrinx perplota
  - †Cymatosyrinx perpolita
  - †Cymatosyrinx vaughanensis
- Cymbovula
  - †Cymbovula acicularis
- Cymodocea
  - †Cymodocea floridana – type locality for species
- †Cynarctoides
  - †Cynarctoides lemur
- †Cynelos
  - †Cynelos caroniavorus
- †Cynorca
- Cynoscion
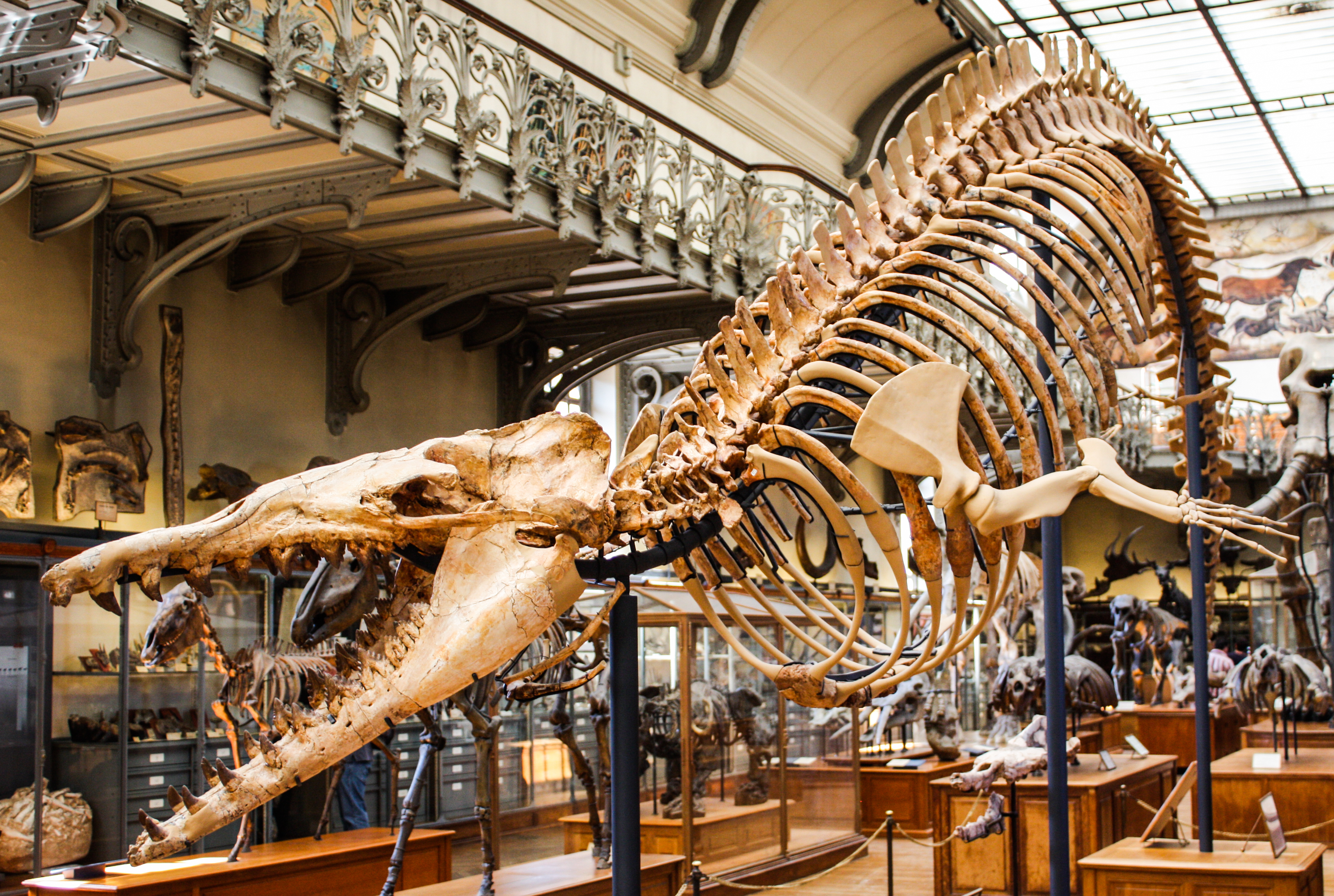
- Mounted fossilized skeleton of the Eocene whale Cynthiacetus
  †Cynthiacetus
  - †Cynthiacetus maxwelli
- Cyphastrea
  - †Cyphastrea tampae – type locality for species
- Cyphoma
  - †Cyphoma carolae
  - †Cyphoma finkli
  - †Cyphoma gibbosum
  - †Cyphoma intermedium
  - †Cyphoma miamiensis
  - †Cyphoma viaavensis
- Multiple views of a shell of a Cypraea cowrie sea snail
  Cypraea
  - †Cypraea problematica
- Cypraecassis
  - †Cypraecassis chipolana
- Cypraedia
  - †Cypraedia fenestralis
- Cypraeolina
  - †Cypraeolina defuniak – type locality for species
  - †Cypraeolina pyrenoides – type locality for species
- †Cypraeorbis
  - †Cypraeorbis arlettae – type locality for species
  - †Cypraeorbis heilprinii
  - †Cypraeorbis kendrewi
  - †Cypraeorbis willcoxi – type locality for species
- Cyprideis
- †Cyrbasia
  - †Cyrbasia brassica
  - †Cyrbasia maisana
  - †Cyrbasia ophiura
- Cyrena
  - †Cyrena floridana
  - †Cyrena pompholyx
- †Cyrenoida
  - †Cyrenoida floridana
- Cyrtopleura
  - †Cyrtopleura arcuata
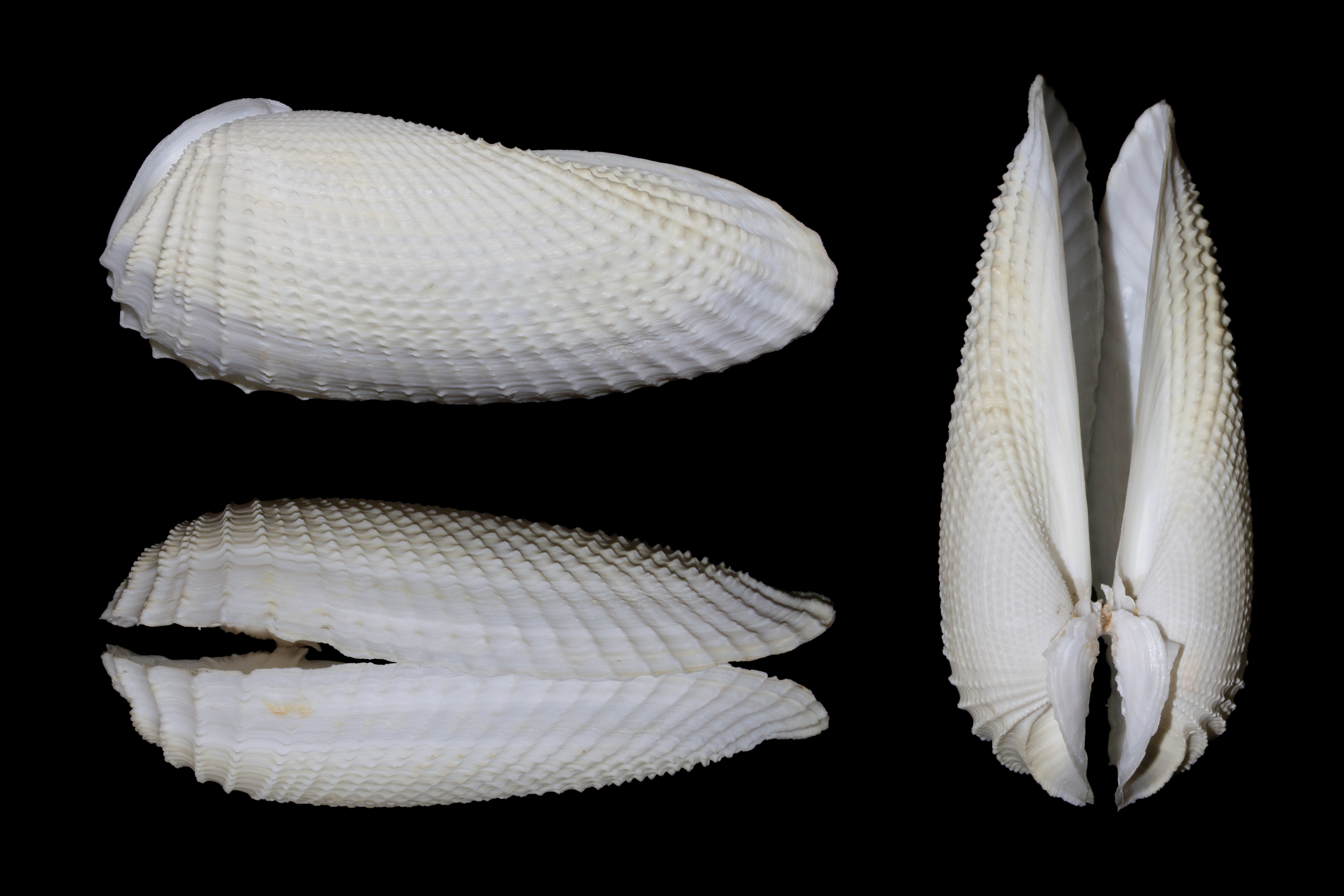
  - Shell in multiple views of a Cyrtopleura costata, or angel wing clam
    †Cyrtopleura costata
- Cythara
  - †Cythara anthera
  - †Cythara anthetika – type locality for species
  - †Cythara asteria – type locality for species
  - †Cythara gardnerae
  - †Cythara harveyensis
  - †Cythara klimakota – type locality for species
  - †Cythara lissa – type locality for species
  - †Cythara louisae
  - †Cythara magnoliana – or unidentified related form
  - †Cythara phrixae – type locality for species
  - †Cythara pyrgota – type locality for species
  - †Cythara sextoni – type locality for species
  - †Cythara stypteria – type locality for species
  - †Cythara teirata – type locality for species
- Cytharella
  - †Cytharella barbadoides – type locality for species
  - †Cytharella chariessa – type locality for species
  - †Cytharella compsacosta – type locality for species
  - †Cytharella cryptopleura – type locality for species
  - †Cytharella galae
  - †Cytharella isabellae – type locality for species
- †Cytheredeis
  - †Cytheredeis ashermani
- †Cythereis
  - †Cythereis americana
  - †Cythereis exanthamata
  - †Cythereis garretti – or unidentified related form
  - †Cythereis martini
  - †Cythereis rugipunctata
  - †Cythereis vaughani
- Cytherella
- Cytheretta
  - †Cytheretta sahnii
- †Cytheriopsis
  - †Cytheriopsis alumensis
- Cytheromorpha
  - †Cytheromorpha warneri
- Cytherura
  - †Cytherura elongata
  - †Cytherura johnsoni
  - †Cytherura wardensis

== D ==
- Daedalochila
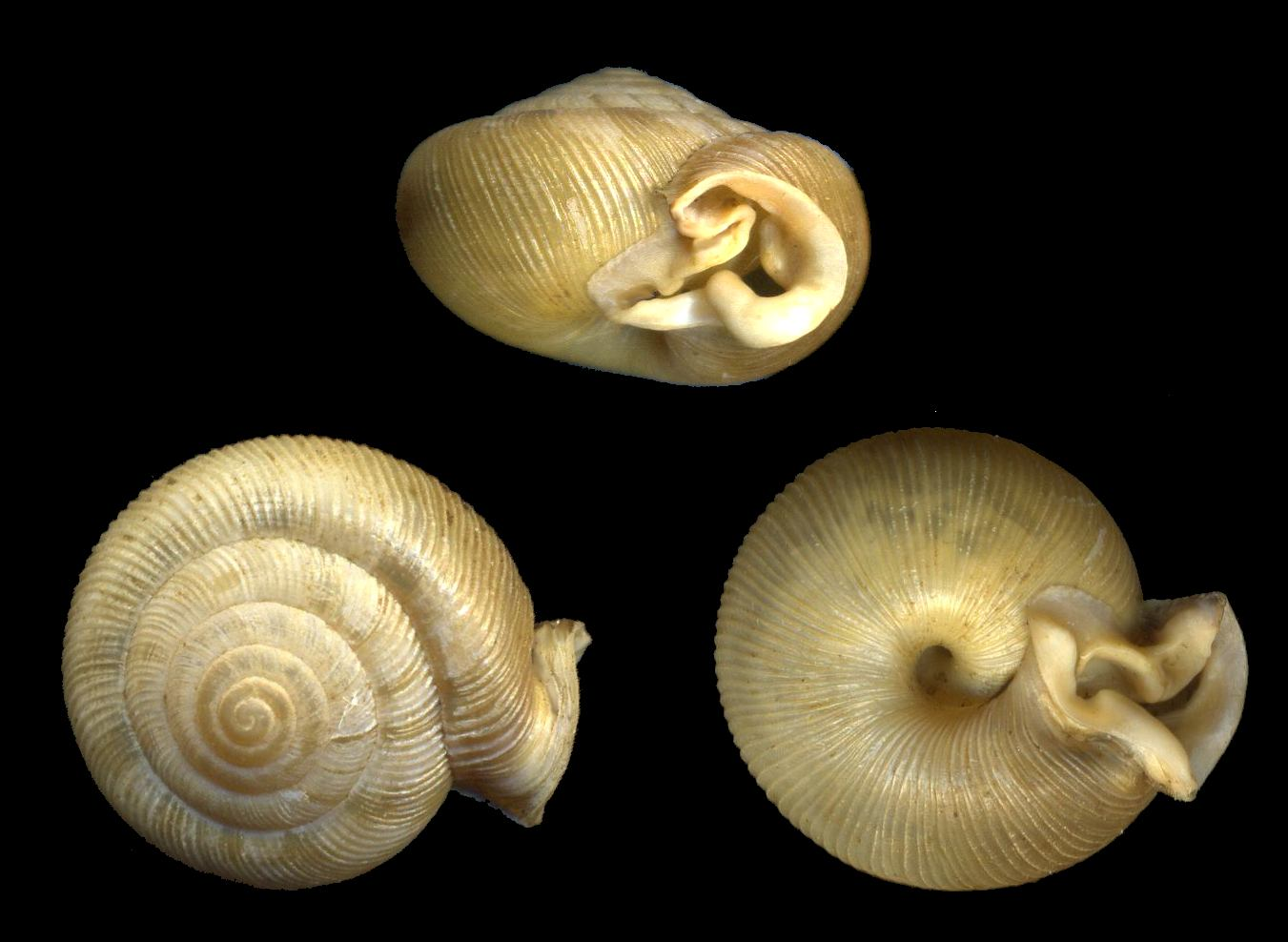
  - Shell in multiple views of a Daedalochila uvulifera, or peninsula liptooth land snail
    †Daedalochila uvulifera
- †Dallarca
  - †Dallarca alomensis
  - †Dallarca idarea
  - †Dallarca idonea
- Dallocardia
  - †Dallocardia muricata
  - †Dallocardia phlyctaena
- Daphnella
  - †Daphnella elata
- †Daphoenodon
  - †Daphoenodon notionastes – type locality for species
- †Daphoenus – tentative report
- Dasyatis
- Dasypus
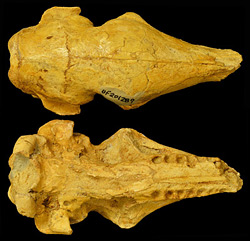
  - Fossilized cranium seen from above and below of the Pleistocene Dasypus bellus, or beautiful armadillo
    †Dasypus bellus – type locality for species
- Dauciconus
  - †Dauciconus bassi
- Deirochelys
  - †Deirochelys carri
  - †Deirochelys reticularia
- †Delphinodon
  - †Delphinodon mento – or unidentified comparable form
- Dendraster
- Dendrocopos
  - †Dendrocopos borealis
- Dendrocygna
- †Dendrogyra
  - †Dendrogyra cylindrus
- Dendropoma
  - †Dendropoma irregulare
- Dentalina
  - †Dentalina communis
- Dentalium
  - †Dentalium antillarium
  - †Dentalium antillarum
  - †Dentalium attenuatum
  - †Dentalium callipeplum – or unidentified related form
  - †Dentalium caloosaense
  - †Dentalium carolinense
  - †Dentalium carolinensis
  - †Dentalium ceratum
  - †Dentalium eboreum
  - †Dentalium ladinum
  - †Dentalium laqueatum
  - †Dentalium pilsbryi
  - †Dentalium pleiocenum
  - †Dentalium santarosanum
  - †Dentalium sowerbyi
- Dentimargo
  - †Dentimargo aureocinctus
  - †Dentimargo caloosana
  - †Dentimargo dalli
  - †Dentimargo eburneola
  - †Dentimargo eburneolus
  - †Dentimargo polyspira
- Depressiscala
  - †Depressiscala nautlae
- Dermomurex
  - †Dermomurex antecessor
  - †Dermomurex curviductus – type locality for species
  - †Dermomurex elizabethae
  - †Dermomurex engonatus – type locality for species
  - †Dermomurex farleyensis – type locality for species
  - †Dermomurex matercula – type locality for species
  - †Dermomurex sexangulus
  - †Dermomurex vaughani – type locality for species
- †Desmathyus
  - †Desmathyus brachydontus
- †Desmatippus
  - †Desmatippus texanus
- †Desmocyon
  - †Desmocyon matthewi
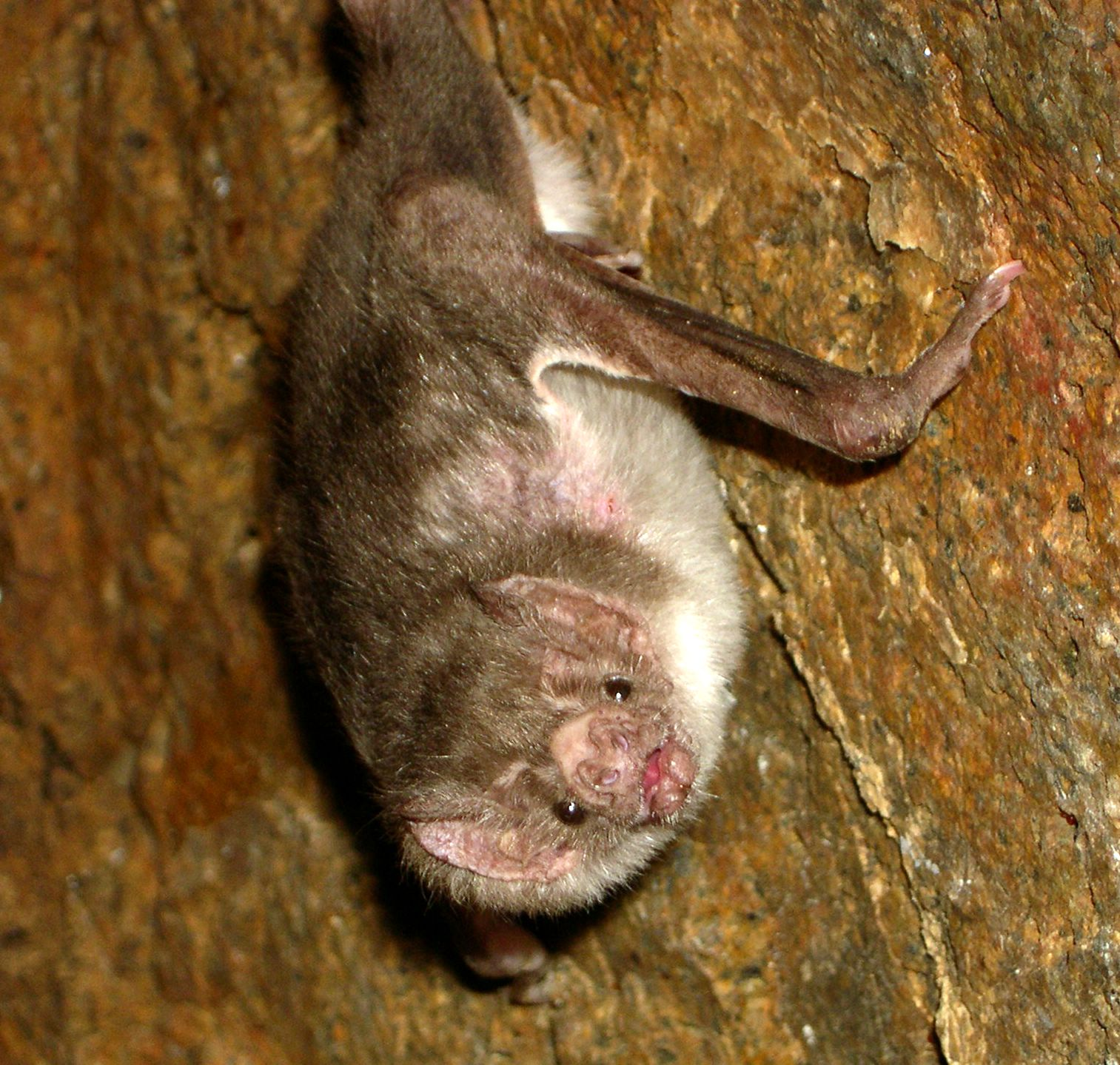
- A living Desmodus, or vampire bat
  Desmodus
  - †Desmodus archaeodaptes – type locality for species
  - †Desmodus stocki
- Desmophyllum
  - †Desmophyllum willcoxi
- †Diabolocornis
  - †Diabolocornis simonsi
- Diadophis
  - †Diadophis elinorae – type locality for species
  - †Diadophis punctatus
- Diastoma
- Dibunostoma – type locality for genus
  - †Dibunostoma purii – type locality for species
- Dicathais
  - †Dicathais handgenae
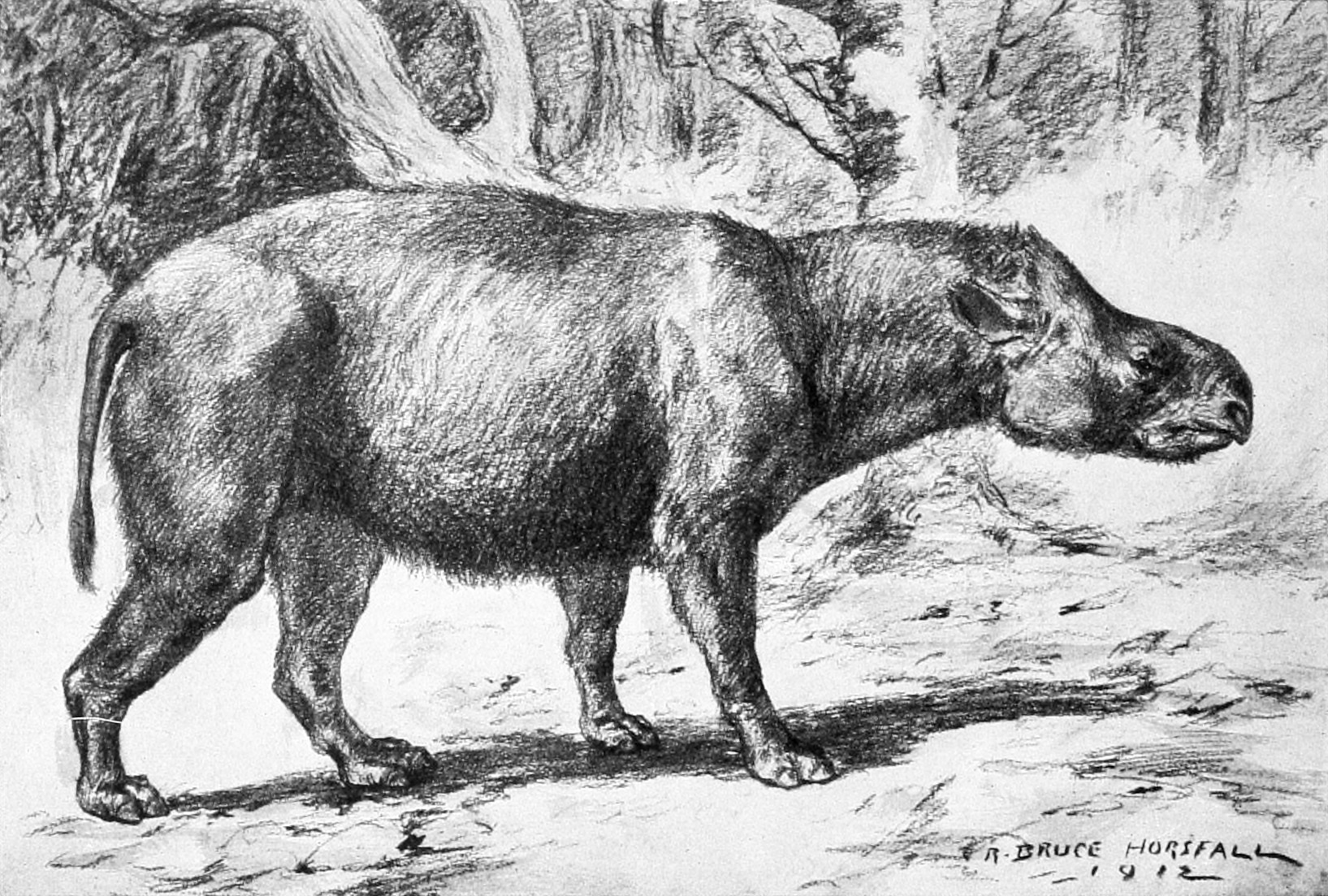
- Restoration of the Oligocene-Miocene hornless rhinoceros Diceratherium. Robert Bruce Horsfall (1913).
  †Diceratherium – or unidentified comparable form
- Dichocoenia
  - †Dichocoenia caloosahatcheensis – type locality for species
  - †Dichocoenia eminens – type locality for species
  - †Dichocoenia stokesi
  - †Dichocoenia tuberosa
- †Dictyoconus
  - †Dictyoconus cookei
- Didelphis
  - †Didelphis marsupialis
  - †Didelphis virginiana
- †Didianema
  - †Didianema duplinensis
  - †Didianema orthorhytis
  - †Didianema pauli
  - †Didianema waltonia – type locality for species
- Didymosella
  - †Didymosella crassa
  - †Didymosella irregularis – type locality for species
- Dinocardium
  - †Dinocardium hazeli
  - †Dinocardium levyi – type locality for species
  - †Dinocardium pinellasense
  - †Dinocardium robustum
  - †Dinocardium taphrium
- †Dinohippus
  - †Dinohippus mexicanus
- †Dinohyus
- Diodon
  - †Diodon circumflexus – type locality for species
- Diodora
  - †Diodora alumensis
  - †Diodora caloosaensis
  - †Diodora carditella
  - †Diodora carolinensis
  - †Diodora cayenensis
  - †Diodora ceryx
  - †Diodora chipolana
  - †Diodora corditella
  - †Diodora daidala – type locality for species
  - †Diodora floridana
  - †Diodora meta
  - †Diodora nucula
  - †Diodora petasa
  - †Diodora sayi
- †Dioplotherium
  - †Dioplotherium manigaulti
- Diplectrum
  - †Diplectrum formosum
- Diplodonta
  - †Diplodonta acclinis
  - †Diplodonta aclinis
  - †Diplodonta alta
  - †Diplodonta caloosaensis
  - †Diplodonta catopotium
  - †Diplodonta glos
  - †Diplodonta leptodoma – type locality for species
  - †Diplodonta nucleiformis
  - †Diplodonta ochlockoneensis
  - †Diplodonta paralta – type locality for species
  - †Diplodonta puncata
  - †Diplodonta punctata
  - †Diplodonta radiata
  - †Diplodonta semiaspera
  - †Diplodonta soror
  - †Diplodonta sphaeromorpha – type locality for species
  - †Diplodonta subvexa
- Diploria
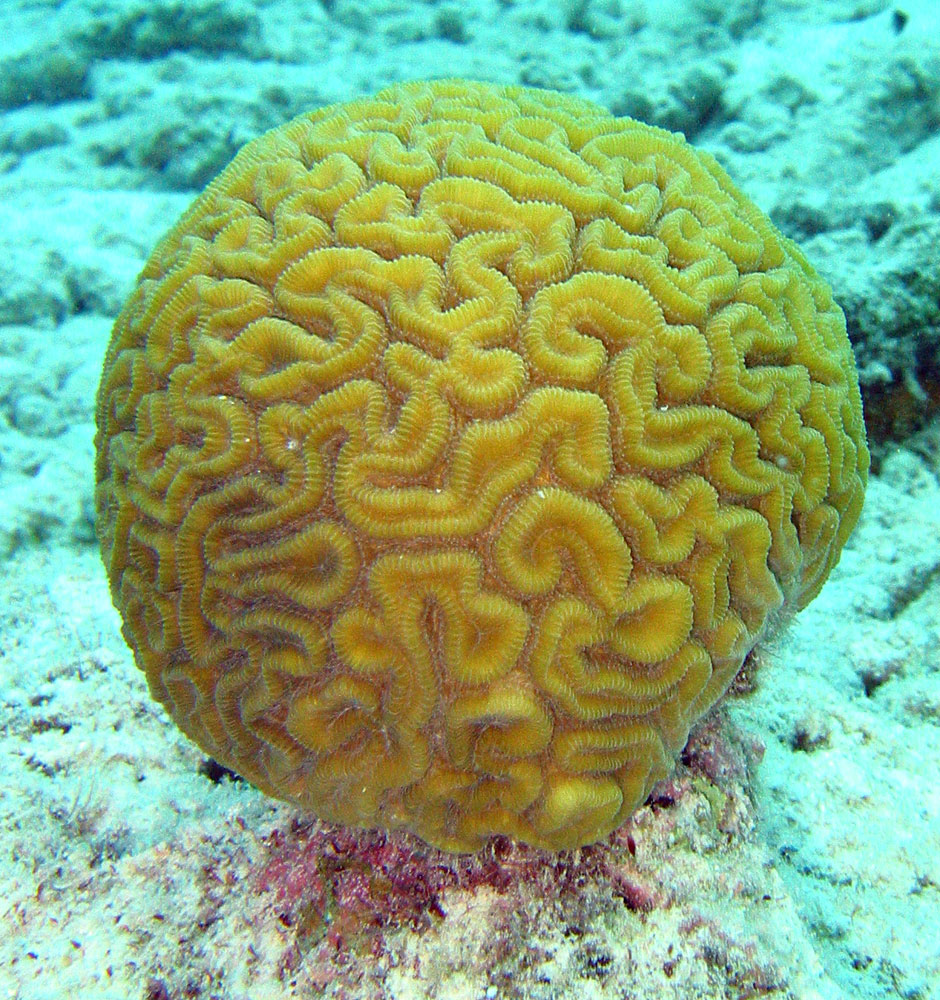
  - Living Diploria labyrinthiformis, or grooved brain coral
    †Diploria labyrinthiformis
  - †Diploria sarasotana – type locality for species
- †Diplotherium
  - †Diplotherium allisoni
- Diplothyra
- †Dipoides
- †Dirocerithium
  - †Dirocerithium americanum
- Discinisca
  - †Discinisca aldrichi – type locality for species
  - †Discinisca lugubris
  - †Discinisca multilineata
- †Discocyclina
  - †Discocyclina flintensis
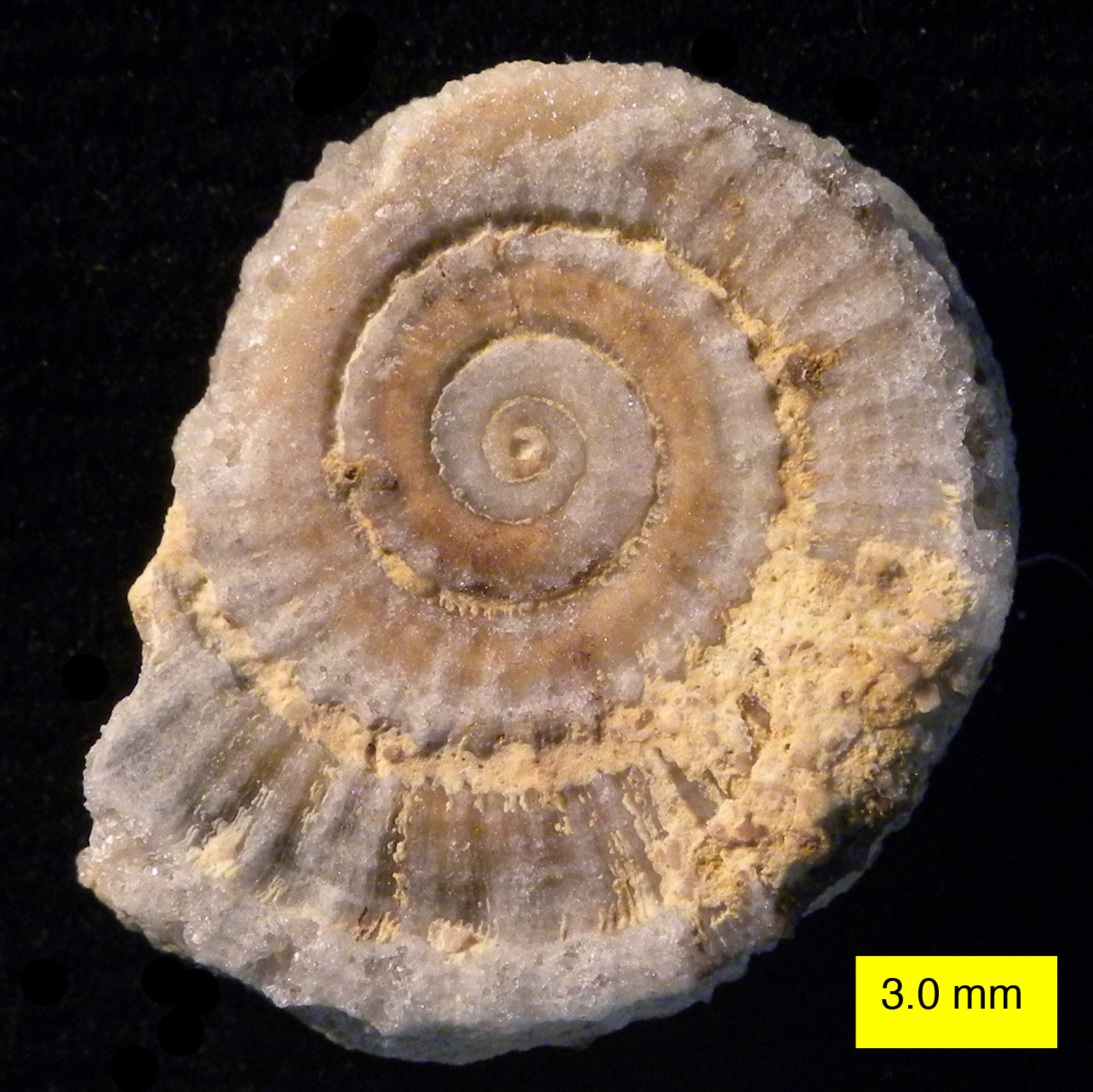
- Fossilized shell of a Discohelix sea snail
  †Discohelix
- Discoporella
  - †Discoporella umbellata
- Discorbis
  - †Discorbis floridana
  - †Discorbis floridensis
  - †Discorbis turrita
- Distorsio
  - †Distorsio crassidens
  - †Distorsio jungi
  - †Distorsio mcgintyi – type locality for species
- †Ditremaster
- Divalinga
  - †Divalinga quadrisulcata
  - †Divalinga waltoniana
- Divaricella
  - †Divaricella chipolana
  - †Divaricella compsa
  - †Divaricella dentata
  - †Divaricella robertsi – type locality for species
  - †Divaricella waltonia – type locality for species
  - †Divaricella waltoniana
  - †Divaricella waltonianum
- †Dixieus
- Dolabella
  - †Dolabella aldrichi
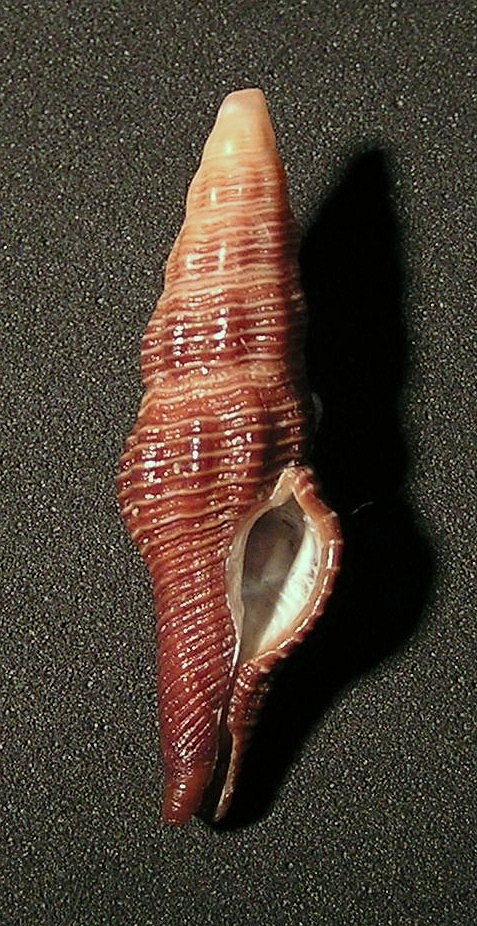
- Shell of a Dolicholatirus sea snail
  †Dolicholatirus
  - †Dolicholatirus metae
- Donax
  - †Donax aldrichi – type locality for species
  - †Donax chipolanus
  - †Donax fossor
  - †Donax trueloides – type locality for species
  - †Donax tumida
  - †Donax valhosierr
  - †Donax variabilis
- †Dorypaltus – type locality for genus
  - †Dorypaltus prophatus
  - †Dorypaltus prosphatus – type locality for species
- Dosinia
  - †Dosinia acetabulum
  - †Dosinia chipolana
  - †Dosinia discus
  - †Dosinia distans
  - †Dosinia liogona
- Dosinidia
  - †Dosinidia dalli – type locality for species
  - †Dosinidia elegans
- Drymarchon
  - †Drymarchon corais
  - †Drymarchon corias
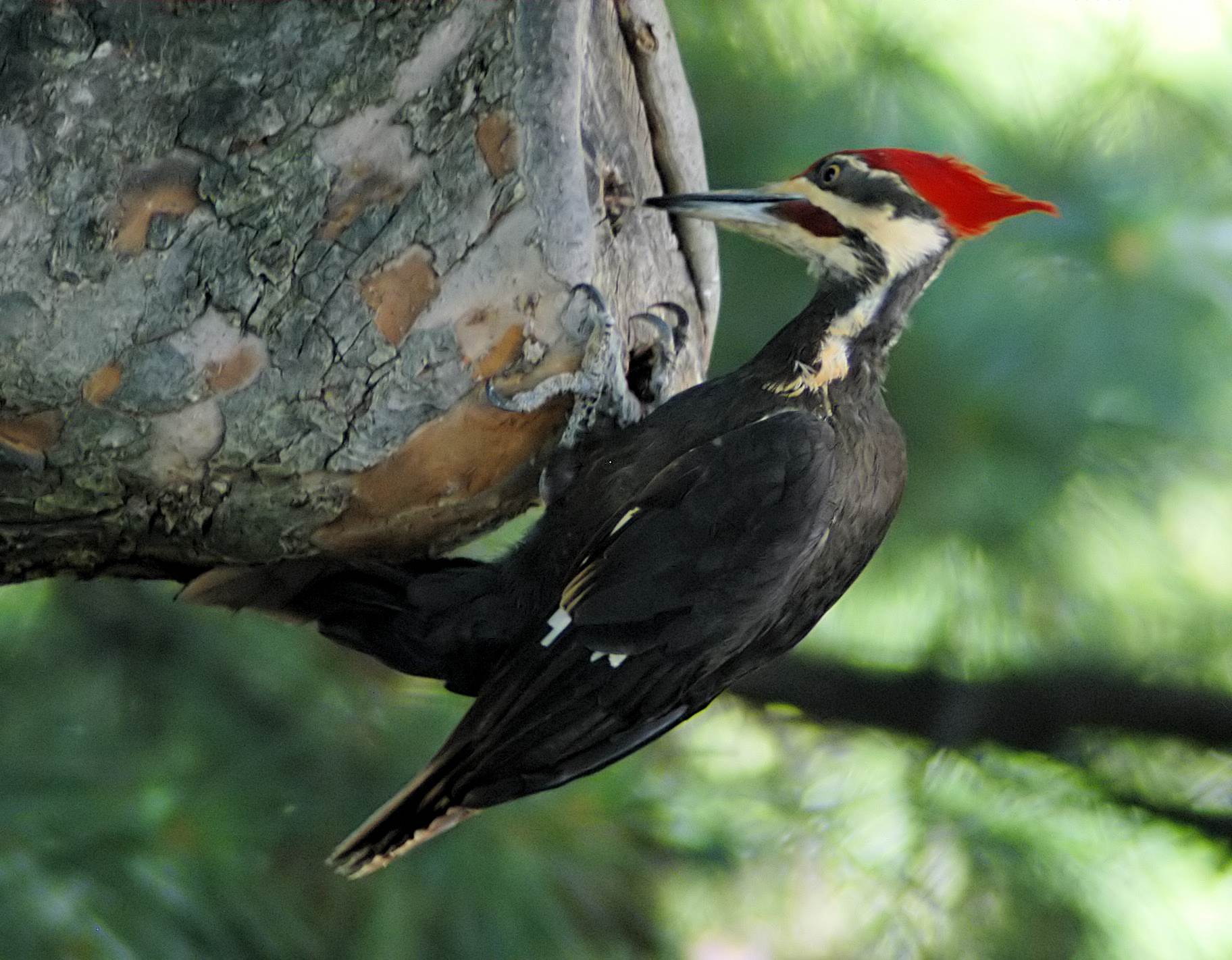
- A living Dryocopus woodpecker
  Dryocopus
- Dumetella
  - †Dumetella carolinensis
- †Durhamella
  - †Durhamella oculanum
- Dyocibicides
  - †Dyocibicides biserialis

== E ==
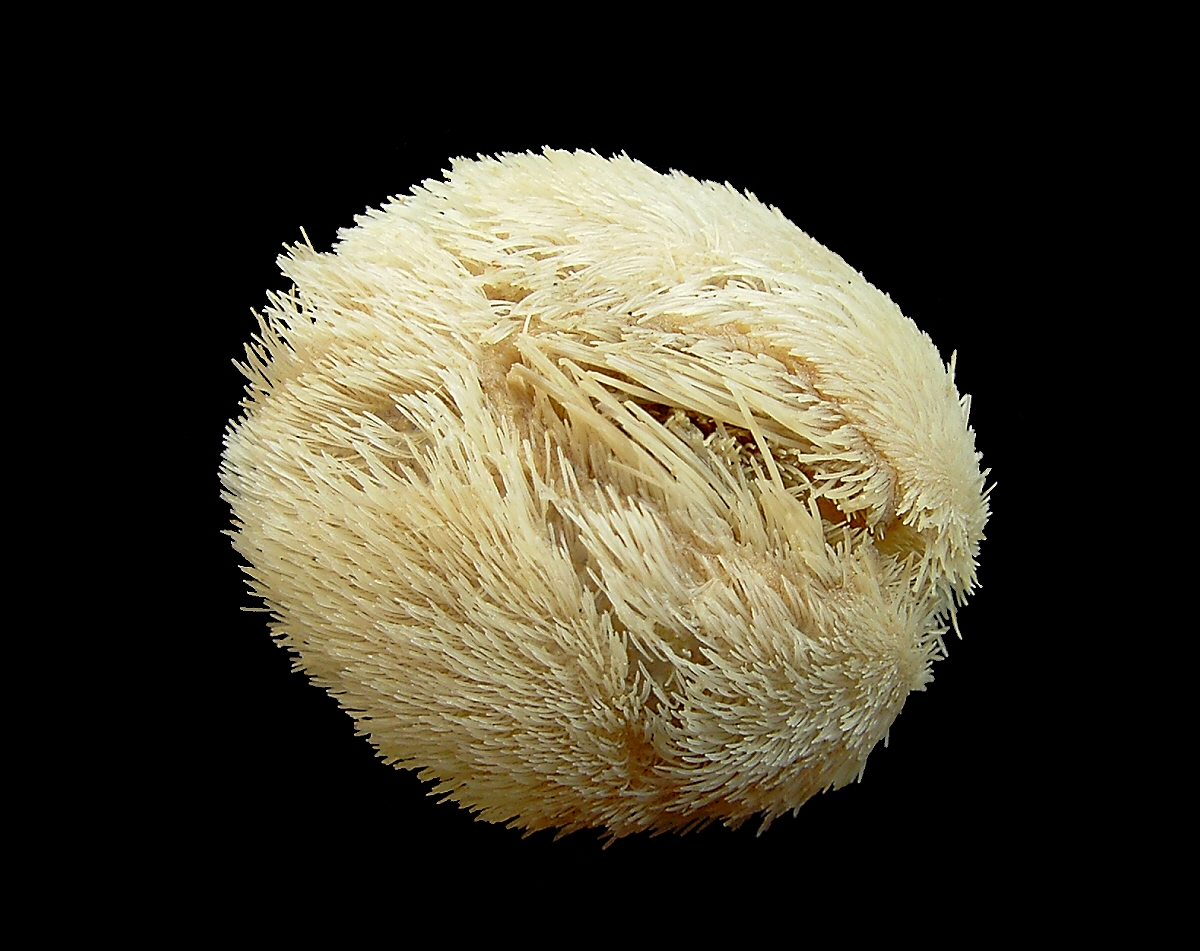
- Shell of an Echinocardium, or heart urchin
  Echinocardium
  - †Echinocardium orthonotum
- Echinocyamus
- †Echinofulgur
  - †Echinofulgur echinatum
- Echinolampas
  - †Echinolampas tanypetalis – type locality for species
- Echinometra
  - †Echinometra lucunter
- †Ecphora
  - †Ecphora bradleyae
  - †Ecphora floridana
  - †Ecphora pachycostata
  - †Ecphora quadricostata
  - †Ecphora roxanae
  - †Ecphora striatula
  - †Ecphora tampaensis
  - †Ecphora violetae
  - †Ecphora whiteoakensis
- †Ectopistes
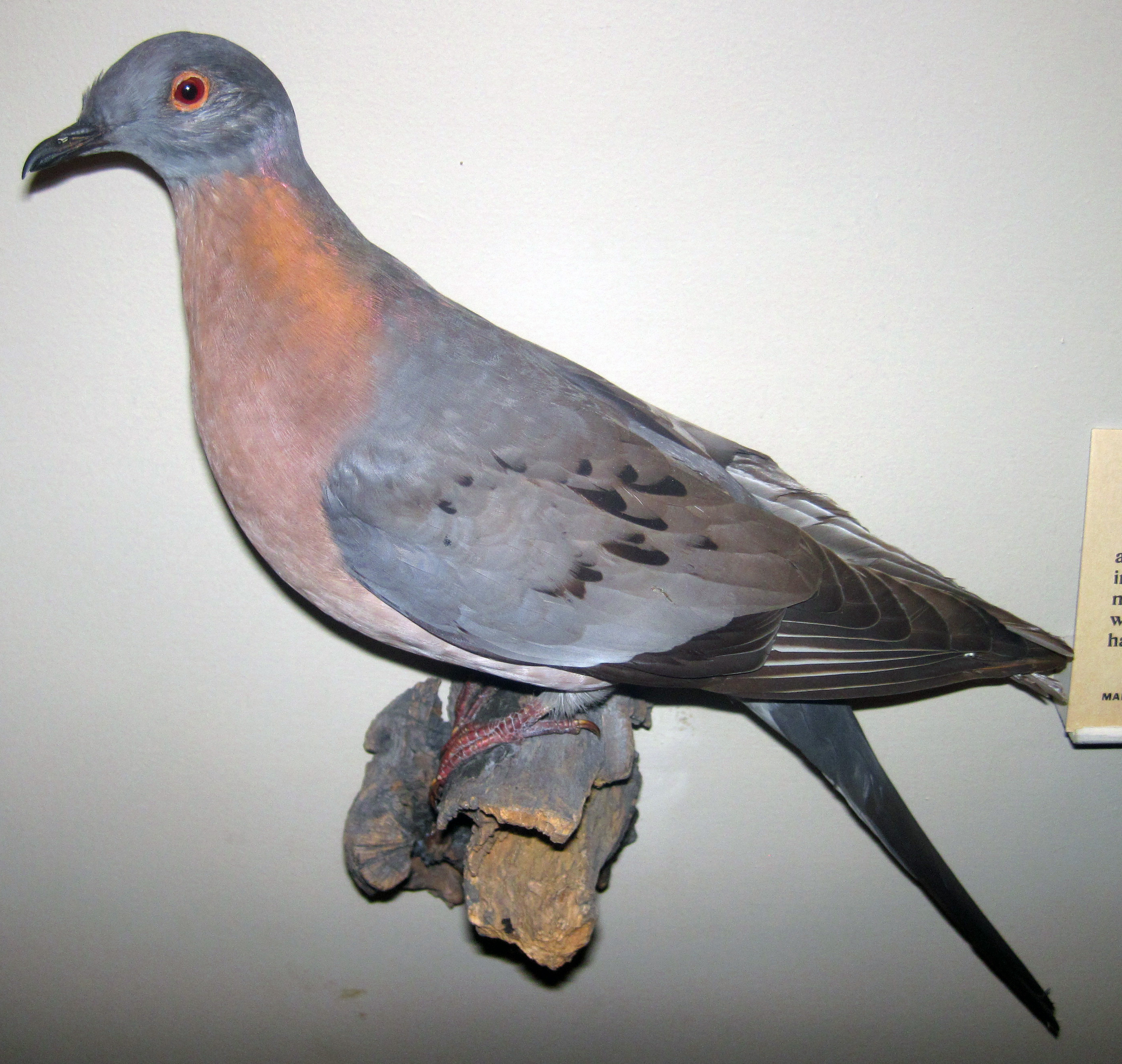
  - Taxidermied male Ectopistes migratorius, or passenger pigeon
    †Ectopistes migratorius
- †Edaphocyon
  - †Edaphocyon palmeri – type locality for species
- Egretta
  - †Egretta subfluvia – type locality for species
  - †Egretta thula
  - †Egretta tricolor – or unidentified comparable form
- Elaphe
  - †Elaphe guttata
  - †Elaphe obsoleta
- Eleutherodactylus – or unidentified comparable form
- †Ellipsolagena
  - †Ellipsolagena bidens
- †Elliptoideus
- Ellisina
  - †Ellisina laxa
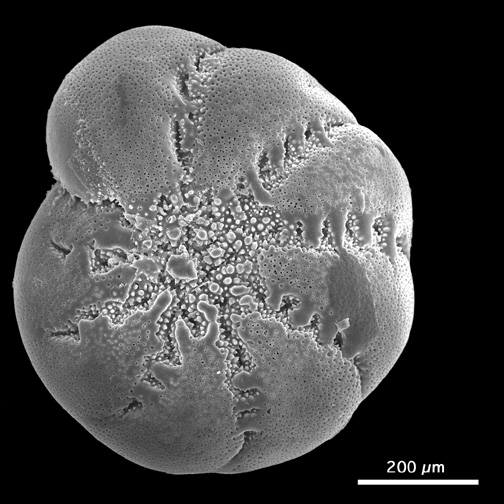
- Test of Elphidium, an Eocene to modern foraminiferan
  Elphidium
  - †Elphidium advenum
  - †Elphidium chipolensis
  - †Elphidium discoidale
  - †Elphidium fimbriatulum
  - †Elphidium incertum
  - †Elphidium latispatium
- Emarginula
  - †Emarginula pilsbryi
- †Emersonius
  - †Emersonius cybosyrinx – type locality for species
- Enaeta
  - †Enaeta isabellae
- Encope
  - †Encope abberans
  - †Encope aberrans
  - †Encope macrophora
  - †Encope michelini
  - †Encope tamiamiensis
- Endopachys
  - †Endopachys tampae – type locality for species
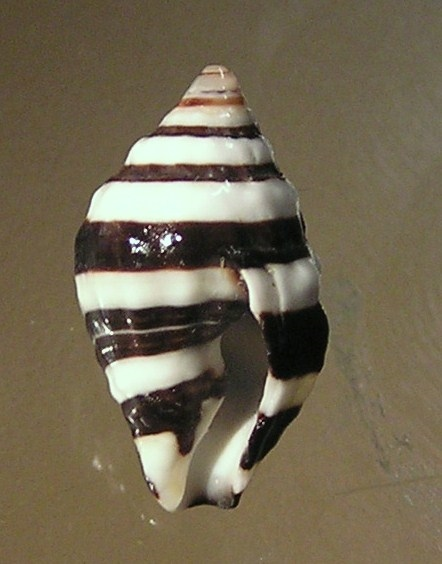
- Shell of an Engina sea snail
  Engina
  - †Engina floridana
- †Engoniophos
  - †Engoniophos glyptus – type locality for species
- †Enhydritherium
  - †Enhydritherium terraenovae – type locality for species
- †Enhydrocyon
  - †Enhydrocyon pahinsintewakpa – or unidentified comparable form
- Enoplostomella
  - †Enoplostomella defixa
  - †Enoplostomella ligulifera
- Ensis
  - †Ensis directus
  - †Ensis minor
- Ensitellops
  - †Ensitellops elongata
  - †Ensitellops protextus
  - †Ensitellops tabula
- Eontia
  - †Eontia incile – or unidentified comparable form
  - †Eontia platyura
  - †Eontia playtyura
  - †Eontia ponderosa
  - †Eontia variabilis
- †Eovasum
  - †Eovasum vernoni – type locality for species
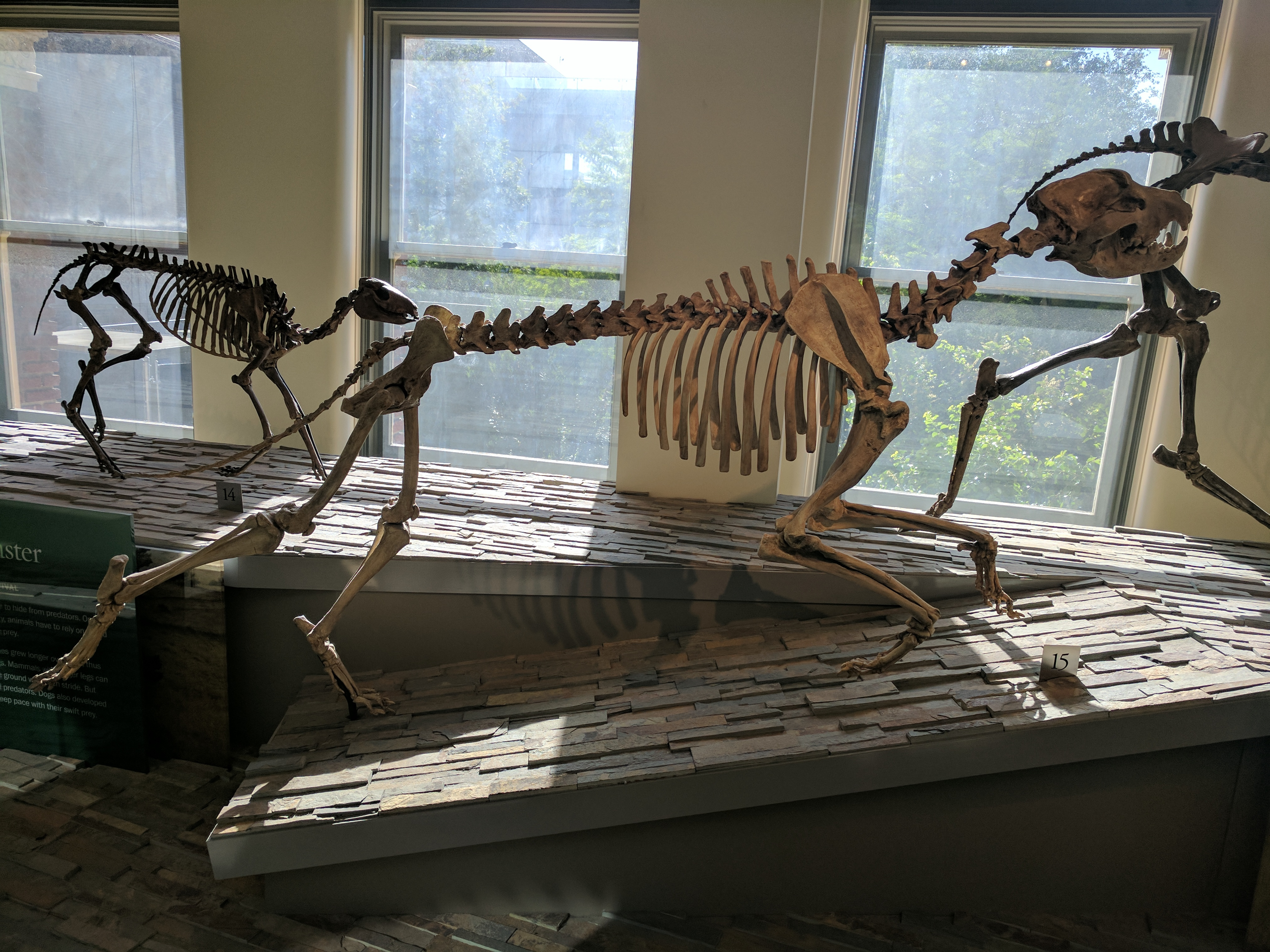
- Mounted fossilized skeleton of the Miocene bone-crushing dog Epicyon
  †Epicyon
  - †Epicyon haydeni
  - †Epicyon saevus
- †Epinephalus
- Episcynia
  - †Episcynia inornata
  - †Episcynia mauryi – type locality for species
- Episiphon
  - †Episiphon schumoi
- Epitonium
  - †Epitonium alaquaense
  - †Epitonium candeanum
  - †Epitonium echinaticosta
  - †Epitonium fargoi
  - †Epitonium foliaceicostum
  - †Epitonium helikum
  - †Epitonium humphreysii
  - †Epitonium junceum
  - †Epitonium lamellosum
  - †Epitonium lineata
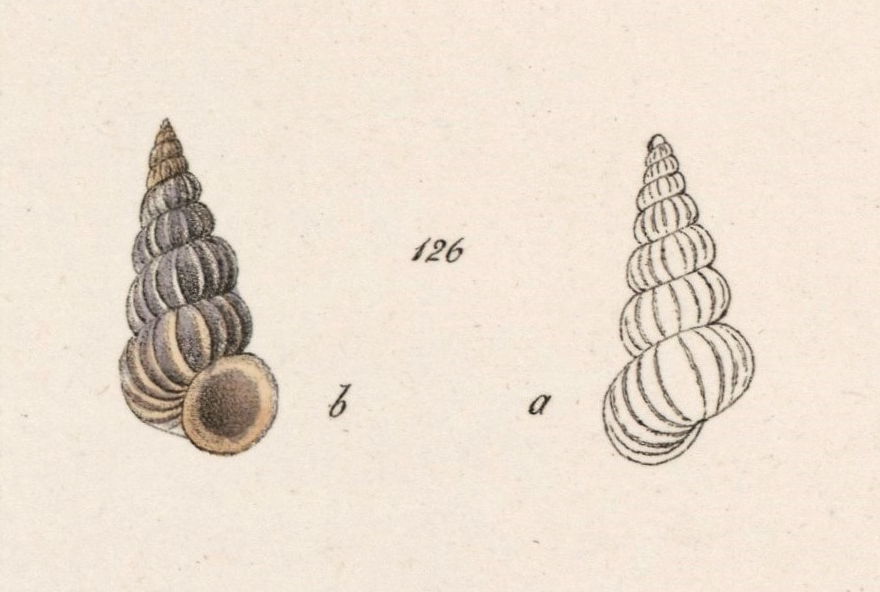
  - Illustration in multiple views of the shell of an Epitonium novangliae, or New England wentletrap
    †Epitonium novangliae
  - †Epitonium rupicola
  - †Epitonium sayanum
  - †Epitonium virginiae
- Eponides
  - †Eponides antillarum
  - †Eponides jacksonensis
- †Eponoides
- Eptesicus
  - †Eptesicus fuscus
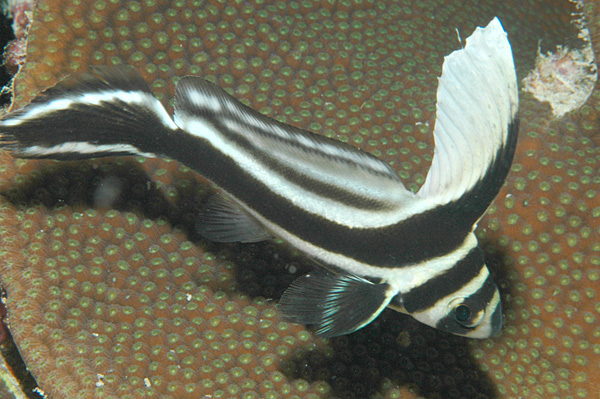
- A living Equetus punctatus, or spotted drum
  Equetus
- Equus
  - †Equus complicatus
  - †Equus fraternus
  - †Equus giganteus
  - †Equus leidyi
- Eratoidea
  - †Eratoidea mollitor
  - †Eratoidea pinellasensis
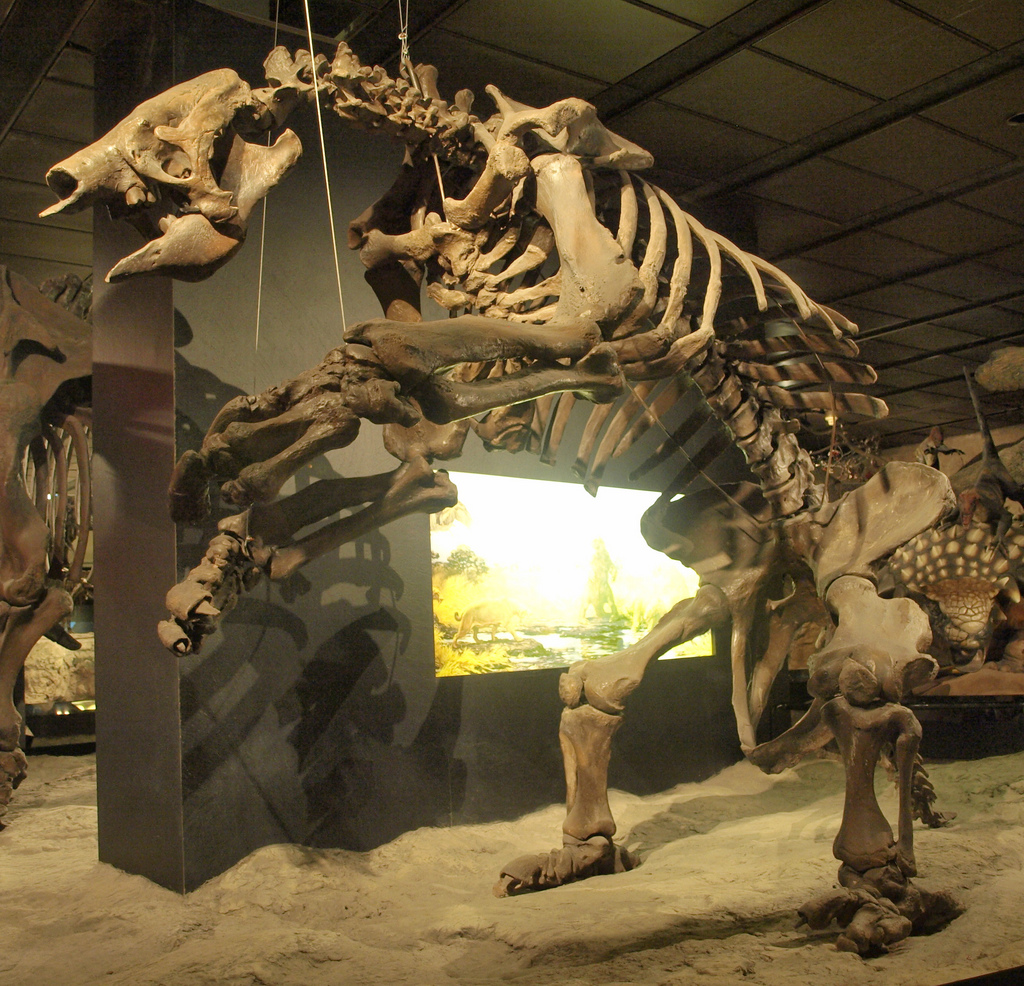
- Mounted fossilized skeleton of the Pliocene-Pleistocene ground sloth Eremotherium
  †Eremotherium
  - †Eremotherium eomigrans – type locality for species
  - †Eremotherium laurillardi
- Erethizon
  - †Erethizon dorsatum
  - †Erethizon kleini – type locality for species
  - †Erethizon poyeri – type locality for species
- Eretmochelys
- †Ereunetes
  - †Ereunetes rayi – type locality for species
- Erolia
  - †Erolia penepusilla – type locality for species
- Ervilia
  - †Ervilia chipolana
  - †Ervilia concentrata
  - †Ervilia concentrica
  - †Ervilia condra – type locality for species
  - †Ervilia lata
  - †Ervilia planata
  - †Ervilia polita
  - †Ervilia valhosierr – type locality for species
- Erycina
  - †Erycina actinophora
  - †Erycina curtidens
  - †Erycina fabulina
  - †Erycina indecisa
  - †Erycina phaseola
  - †Erycina scaptera – type locality for species
  - †Erycina undosa
- Escharina
  - †Escharina hyndmanni
- Escharoides
  - †Escharoides erectus
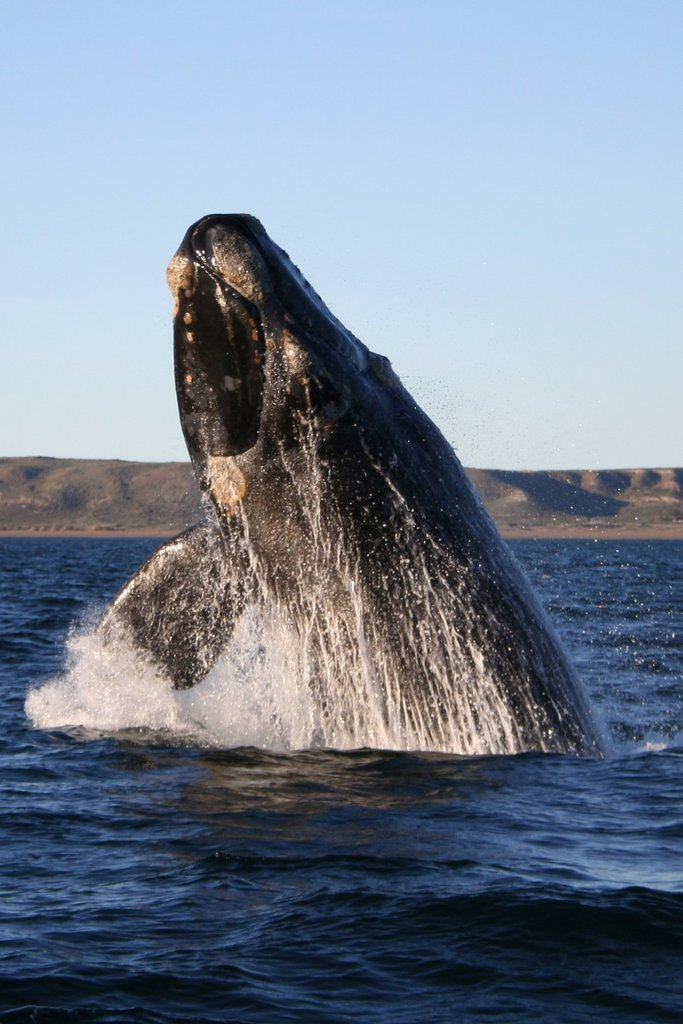
- A living Eubalaena, or Right whale
  Eubalaena
- Eucidaris
  - †Eucidaris tribuloides
- †Euclathurella
  - †Euclathurella liveoakensis
- †Euclinostomus
  - †Euclinostomus gula
- Eucrassatella
  - †Eucrassatella densa
  - †Eucrassatella meriodonalis
  - †Eucrassatella speciosa
- †Eucymba
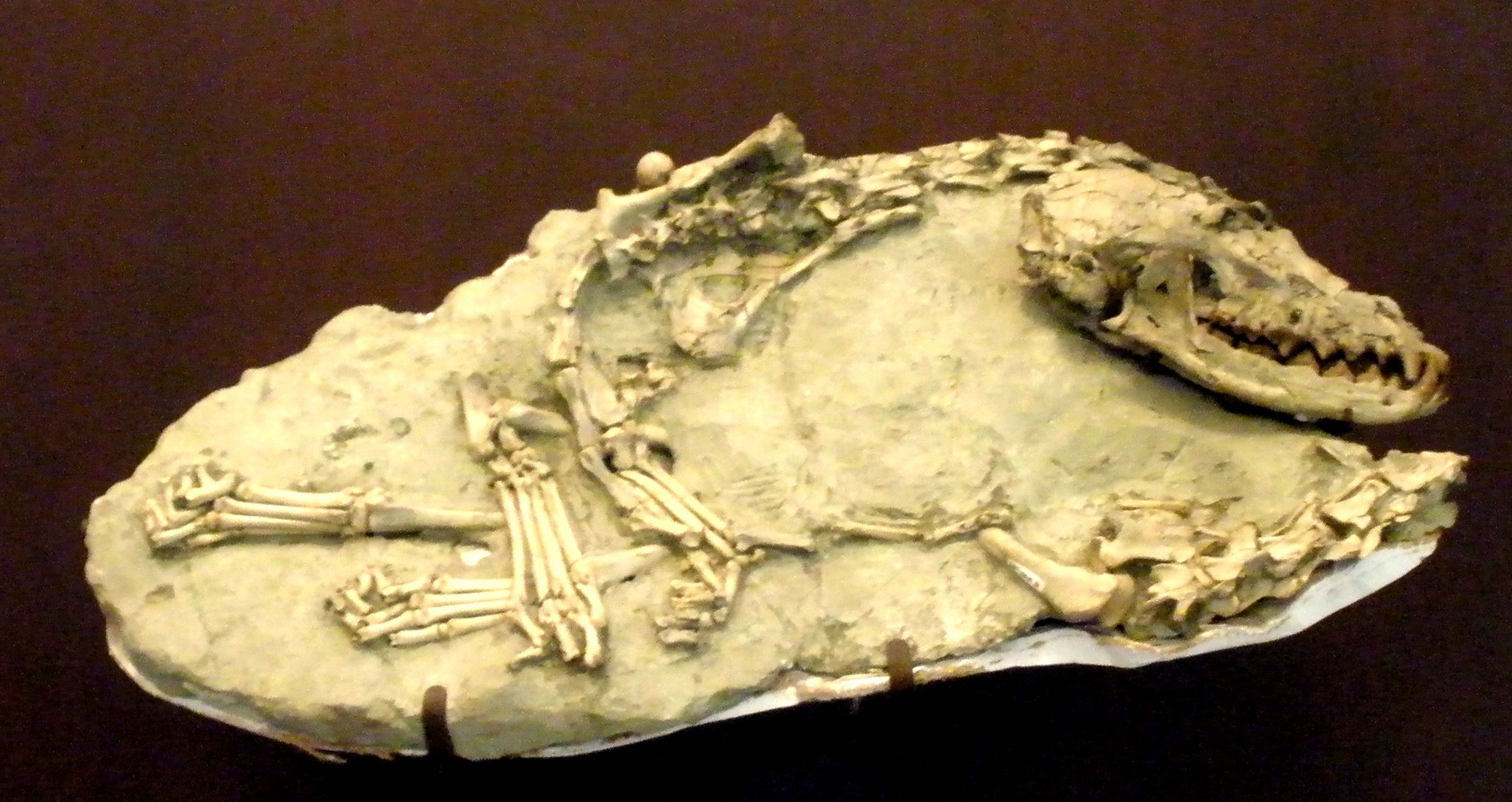
- Fossilized skeleton of the Miocene-Pliocene coyote-like canine Eucyon
  †Eucyon
  - †Eucyon davisi
- †Eucypraedia
  - †Eucypraedia multicarinata – type locality for species
- Eudocimus
  - †Eudocimus albus
  - †Eudocimus leiseyi – type locality for species
- †Eudocirnus
  - †Eudocirnus leiseyi
- †Eudolium
  - †Eudolium subfasciatum
- Eugeniconus
  - †Eugeniconus irisae
  - †Eugeniconus paranobilis
- Euglandina
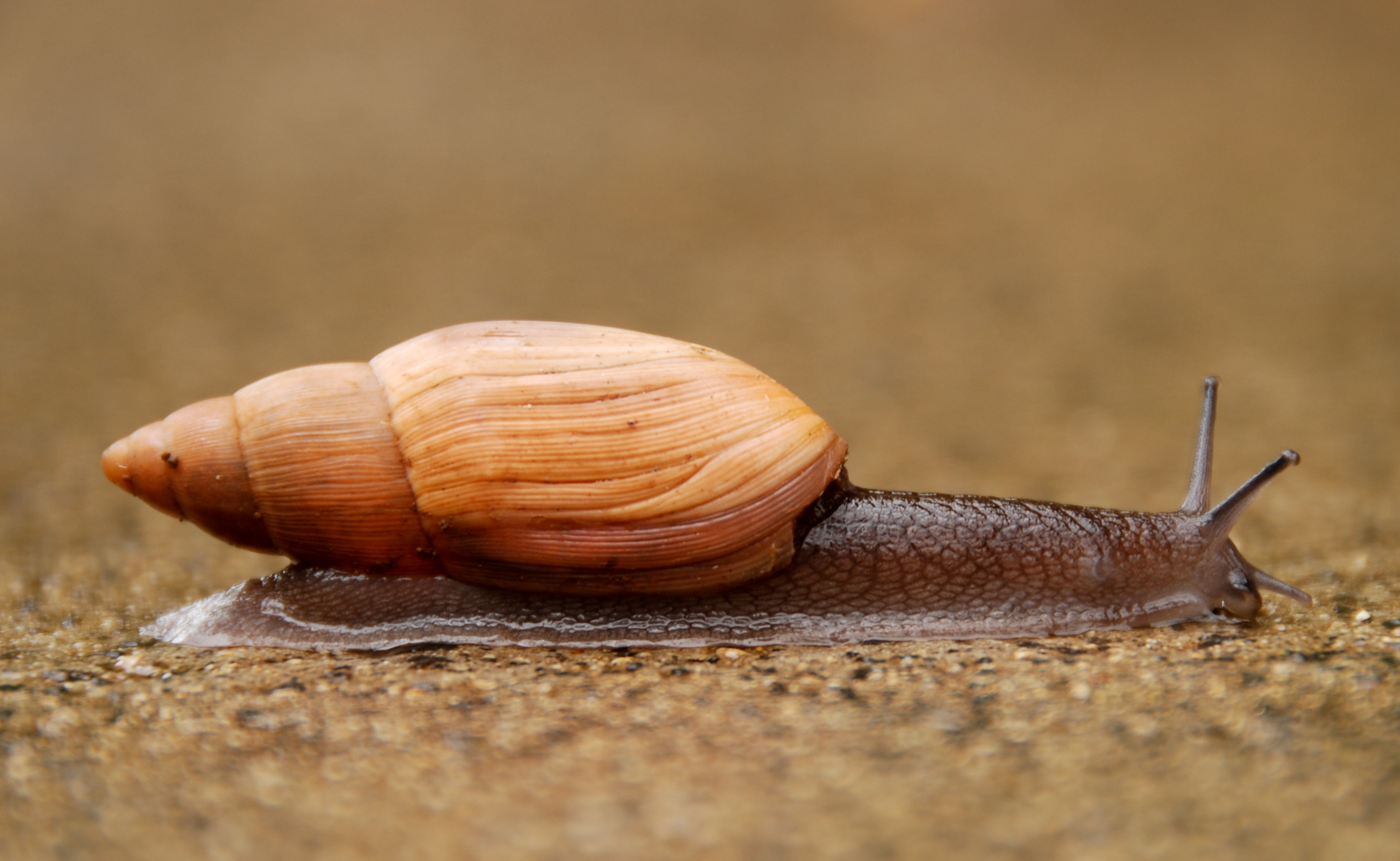
  - A living Euglandina rosea, also known as the rosy wolfsnail or the cannibal land snail
    †Euglandina rosea
- Eulima
  - †Eulima bifasciata
  - †Eulima nobilis
- Eulithidium
  - †Eulithidium thalassicola
- †Euloxa – report made of unidentified related form or using admittedly obsolete nomenclature
- Eumeces
  - †Eumeces fasciatus
  - †Eumeces inexpectatus
- Eumops – type locality for genus
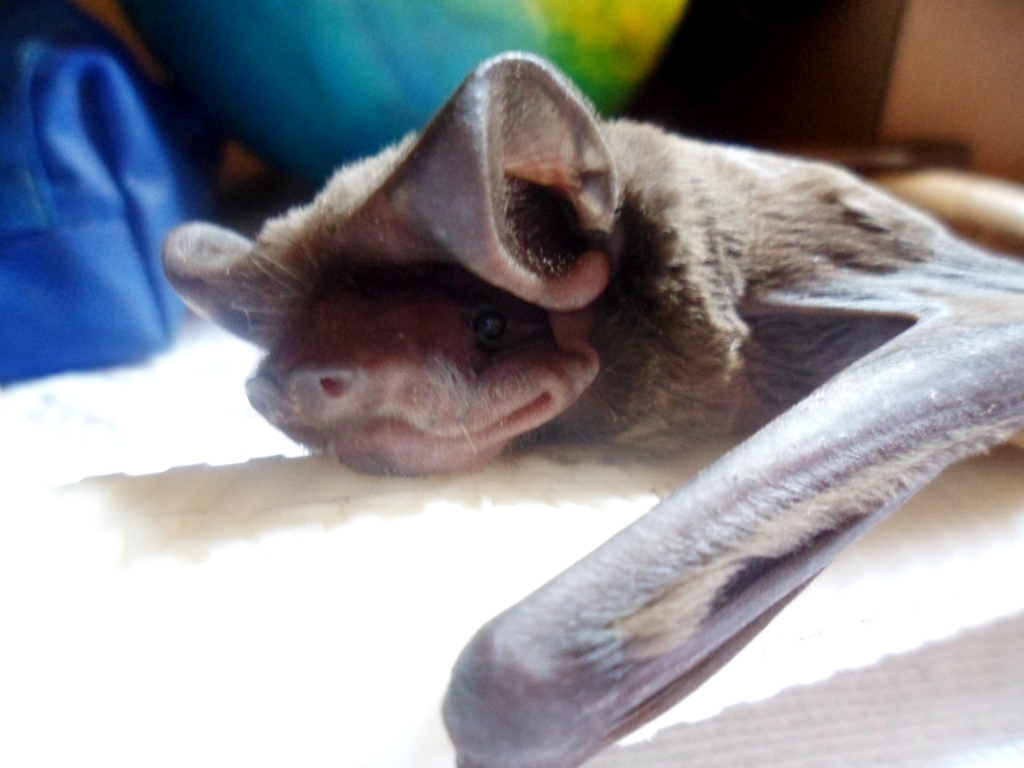
  - A living Eumops glaucinus, or Wagner's bonneted bat
    †Eumops glaucinus – type locality for species
- †Euoplocyon
  - †Euoplocyon spissidens
- Eupatagus
  - †Eupatagus antillarum
  - †Eupatagus clevei
  - †Eupatagus mooreanus
- Euphagus
  - †Euphagus cyanocephalus
- Eupleura
  - †Eupleura caloosa
  - †Eupleura calusa
  - †Eupleura caudata
  - †Eupleura intermedia
  - †Eupleura miocenica
  - †Eupleura pterina – type locality for species
  - †Eupleura sulcidentata
  - †Eupleura tampaensis
- †Eurhodia
  - †Eurhodia patelliformis
- Eurypyrene
  - †Eurypyrene miccosukee
- Eurytellina
  - †Eurytellina alternata
  - †Eurytellina lineata
  - †Eurytellina nitens
  - †Eurytellina pressa
  - †Eurytellina roburina
  - †Eurytellina strictolineata
  - †Eurytellina tayloriana
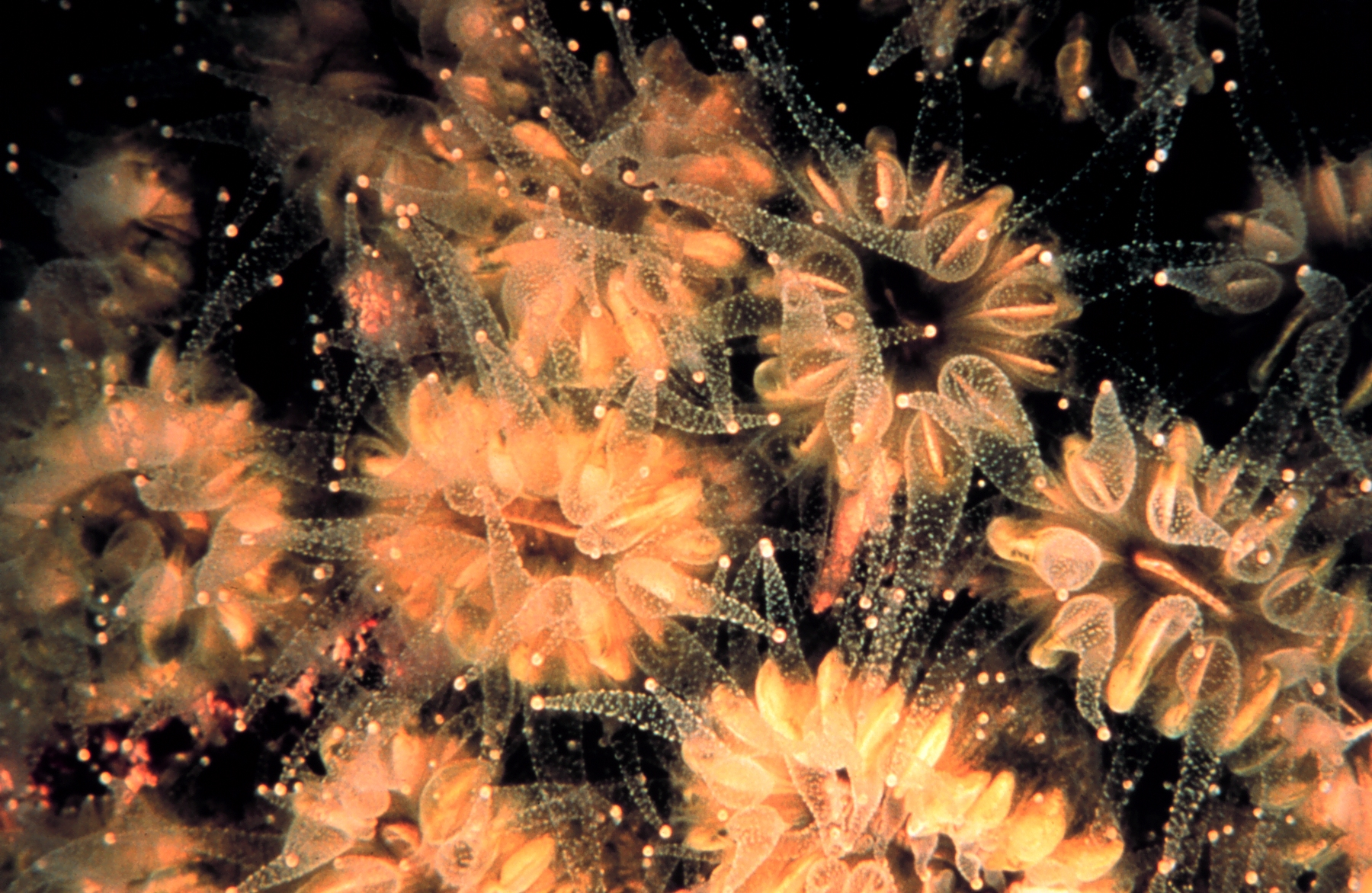
- A living Eusmilia stony coral
  Eusmilia
  - †Eusmilia fastigiata
- Euspira
  - †Euspira caudata
  - †Euspira hemicryptus
  - †Euspira rotunda – type locality for species
- Euvola
  - †Euvola bowdenensis – or unidentified related form
  - †Euvola hemicyclicus
  - †Euvola ochlockoneensis
  - †Euvola raveneli
  - †Euvola smithi
  - †Euvola ziczac
- †Exputens
  - †Exputens ocalensis

== F ==
- Fabella
  - †Fabella dalli
  - †Fabella navicula
- Falco
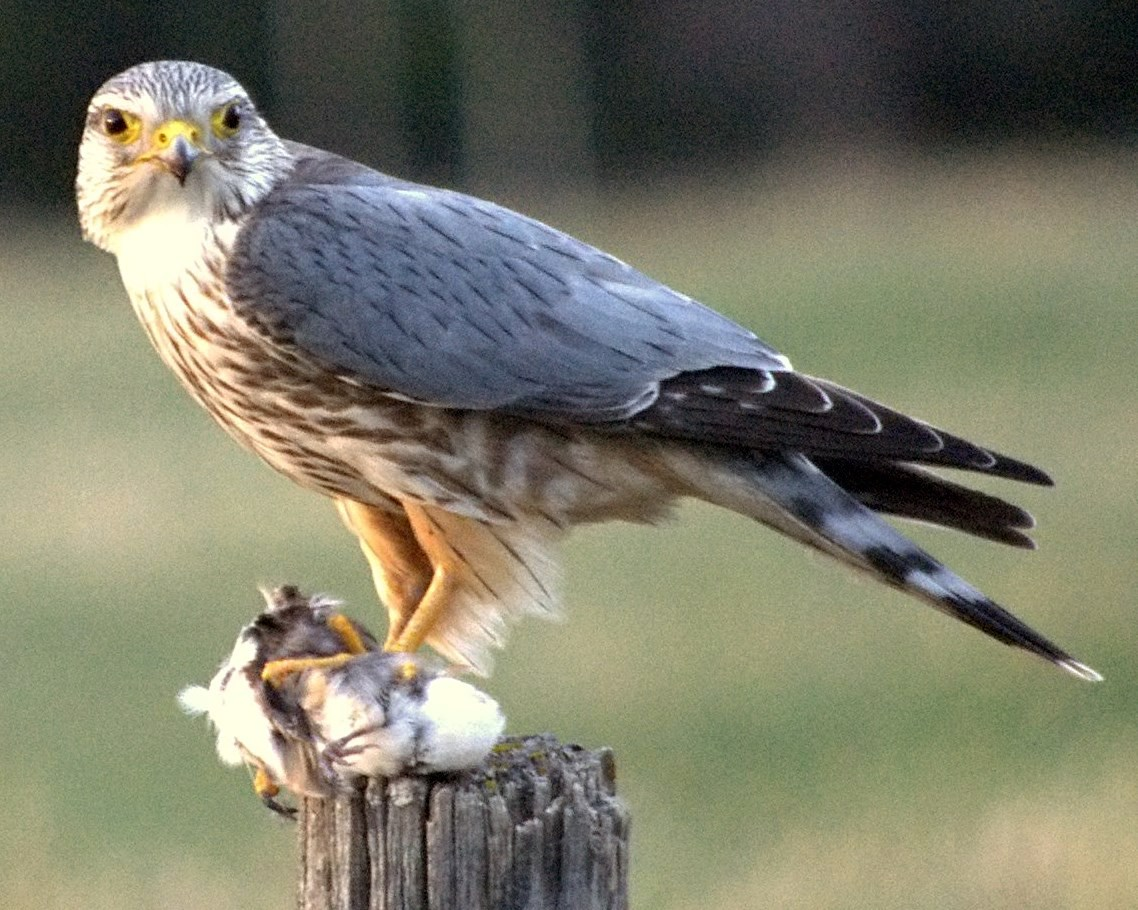
  - A living Falco columbarius, or merlin
    †Falco columbarius
  - †Falco peregrinus
  - †Falco readi – type locality for species
  - †Falco sparverius
- Falsifusus
- †Falsilyria
  - †Falsilyria citrusensis
  - †Falsilyria eocenia
  - †Falsilyria kendrewi
  - †Falsilyria mansfieldi
- Farancia
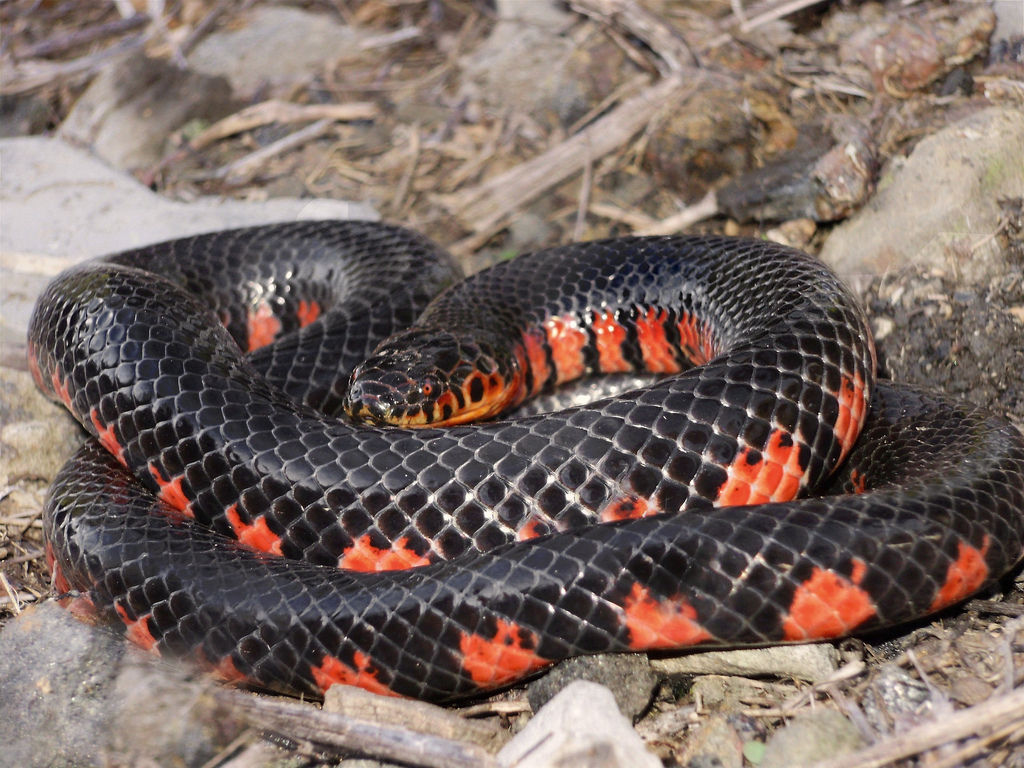
  - A living Farancia abacura, or mud snake
    †Farancia abacura
- Fasciolaria
  - †Fasciolaria apicina
  - †Fasciolaria calusa
  - †Fasciolaria evergladensis
  - †Fasciolaria monocingulata
  - †Fasciolaria okeechobeensis
  - †Fasciolaria petrosa
  - †Fasciolaria ramondi
  - †Fasciolaria rhomboidea
  - †Fasciolaria scalarina
  - †Fasciolaria seminole
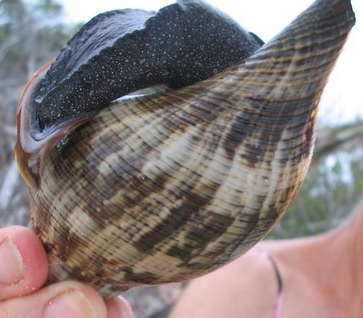
  - A living Fasciolaria tulipa, or true tulip sea snail
    †Fasciolaria tulipa
- Favartia
  - †Favartia cellulosa
- Favia
  - †Favia fragum
- Favites
  - †Favites yborensis – type locality for species
- Felis
  - †Felis rexroadensis
- Fenimorea
  - †Fenimorea fucata
  - †Fenimorea moseri
  - †Fenimorea pagodula
- Ferrissia
  - †Ferrissia hendersoni
- Fibularia
  - †Fibularia vaughani
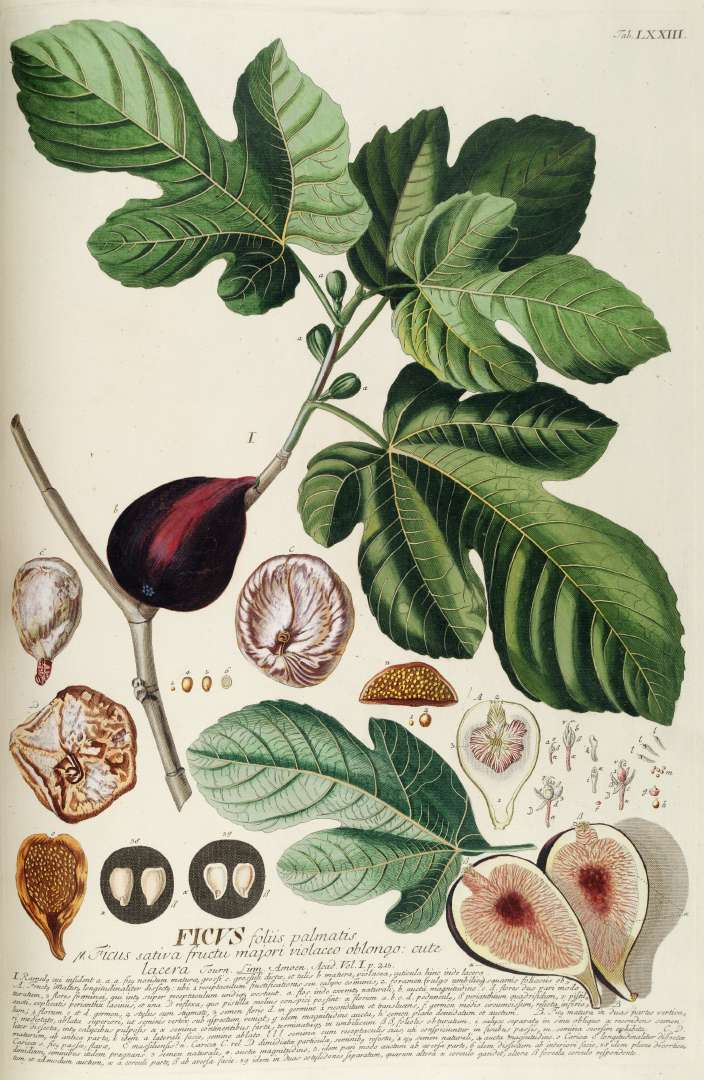
- Illustration of the fruit and foliage of a living Ficus carica, or Common fig
  Ficus
  - †Ficus communis
  - †Ficus eopapyratia – type locality for species
  - †Ficus floridensis
  - †Ficus holmesi
  - †Ficus jacksonensis
  - †Ficus mississippiensis
  - †Ficus papyratium – or unidentified related form
- Figularia
  - †Figularia crassicostulata
- Fimbria
  - †Fimbria olssoni – type locality for species
  - †Fimbria vernoni – type locality for species
- Finella
  - †Finella adamsi
  - †Finella dubia
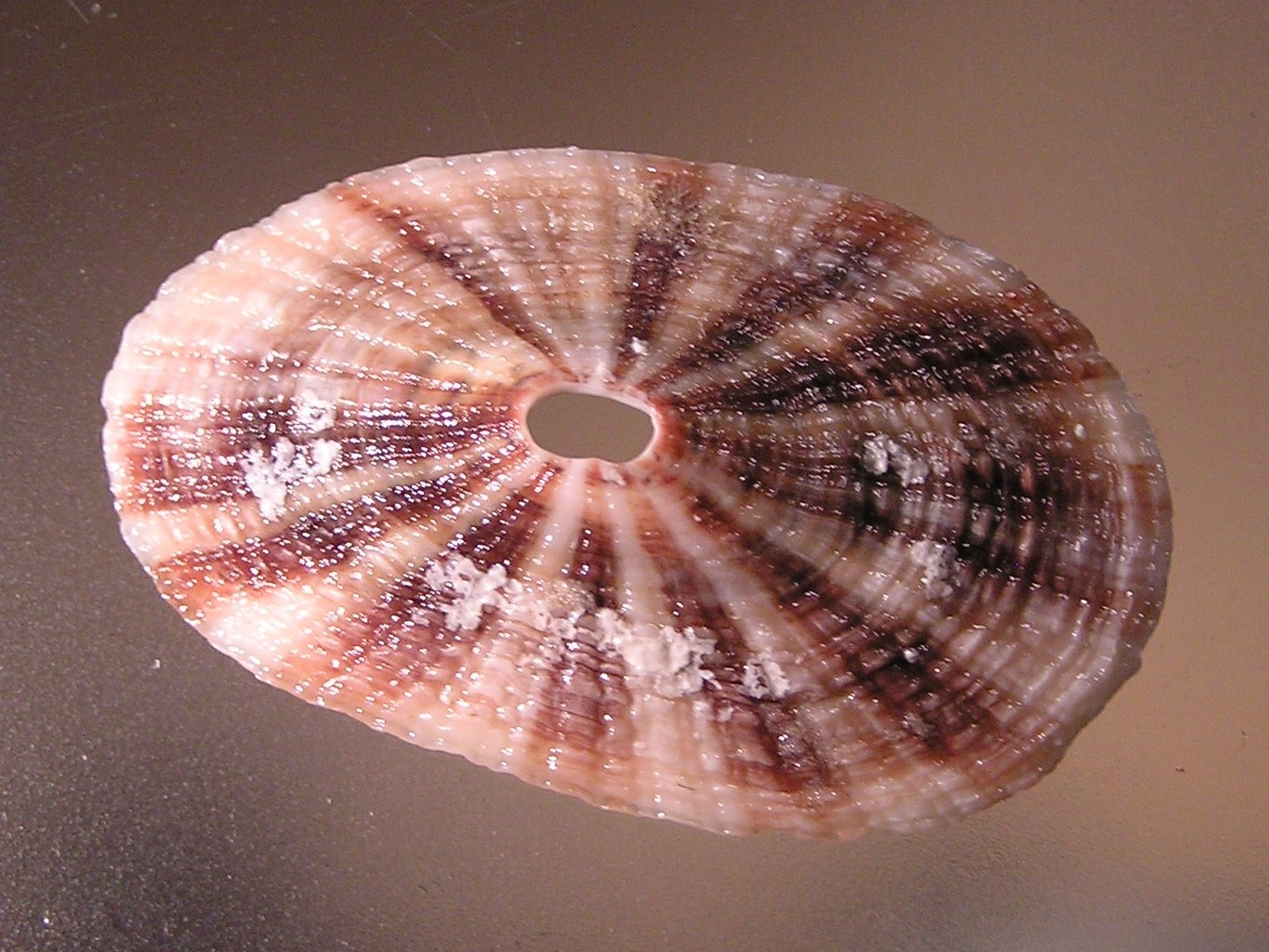
- Shell of a Fissurella keyhole limpet
  Fissurella
- Flabellum
  - †Flabellum chipolanum – type locality for species
  - †Flabellum dubium
  - †Flabellum exaratum
  - †Flabellum moseleyi
- †Floradusta
  - †Floradusta alumensis – type locality for species
- †Florida
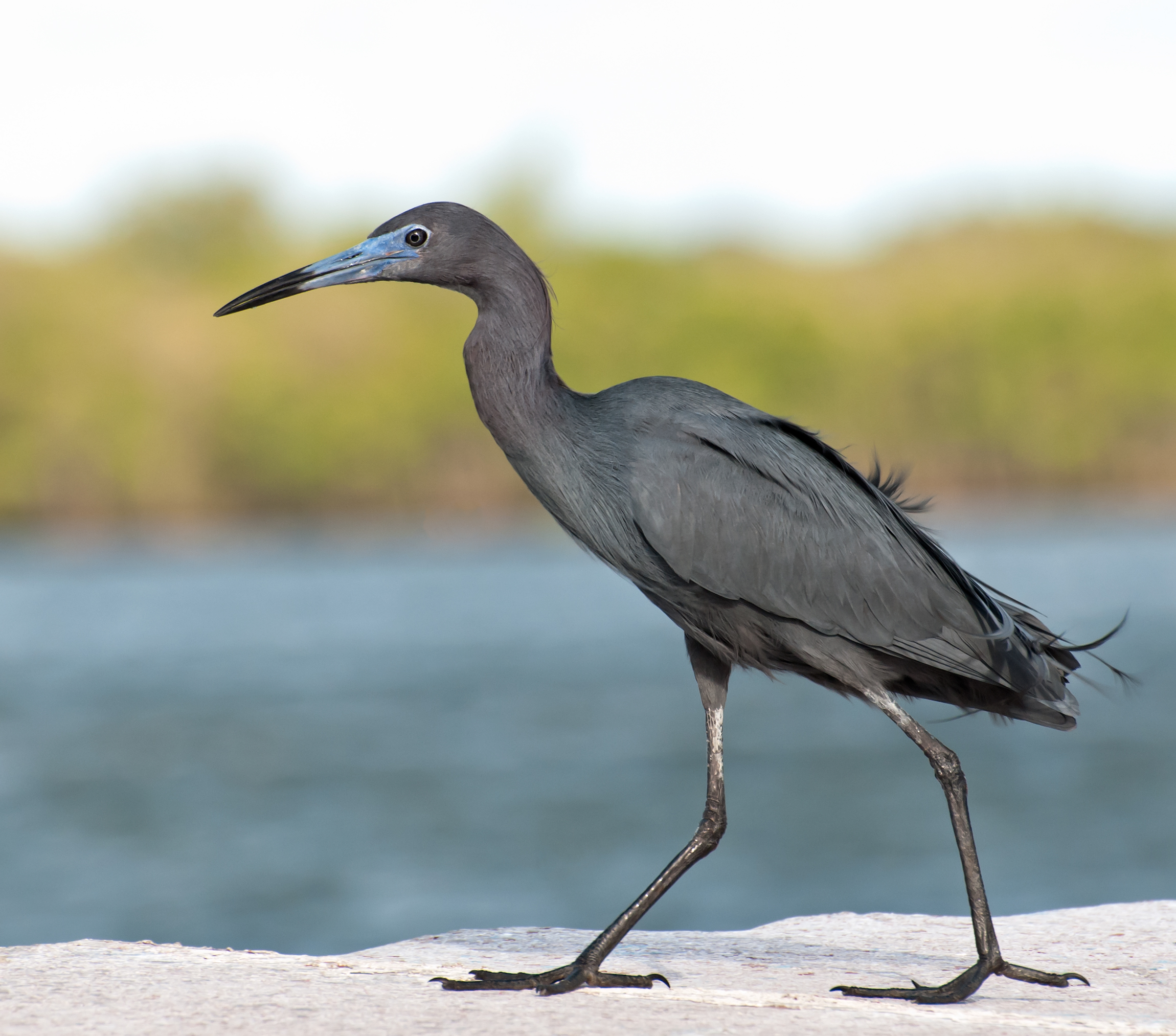
  - A living Egretta caerulea, or little blue heron
    †Florida caerulea
- †Floridaceras
  - †Floridaceras whitei
- †Floridachoerus
  - †Floridachoerus olseni – type locality for species
- †Floridameryx – type locality for genus
  - †Floridameryx floridanus – type locality for species
- †Floridaophis – type locality for genus
  - †Floridaophis auffenbergi – type locality for species
- †Floridatragulus
  - †Floridatragulus dolichanthereus – type locality for species
- †Floridemys – type locality for genus
  - †Floridemys nanus – type locality for species
- Floridina
  - †Floridina antiqua
  - †Floridina bifoliata
- †Florimetis
  - †Florimetis biplicata
  - †Florimetis chipolana
  - †Florimetis magnoliana
- Fontigens – report made of unidentified related form or using admittedly obsolete nomenclature
- Fossaria
  - †Fossaria cubensis
- Fossarus
  - †Fossarus anomala
  - †Fossarus chipolanus
  - †Fossarus florius – type locality for species
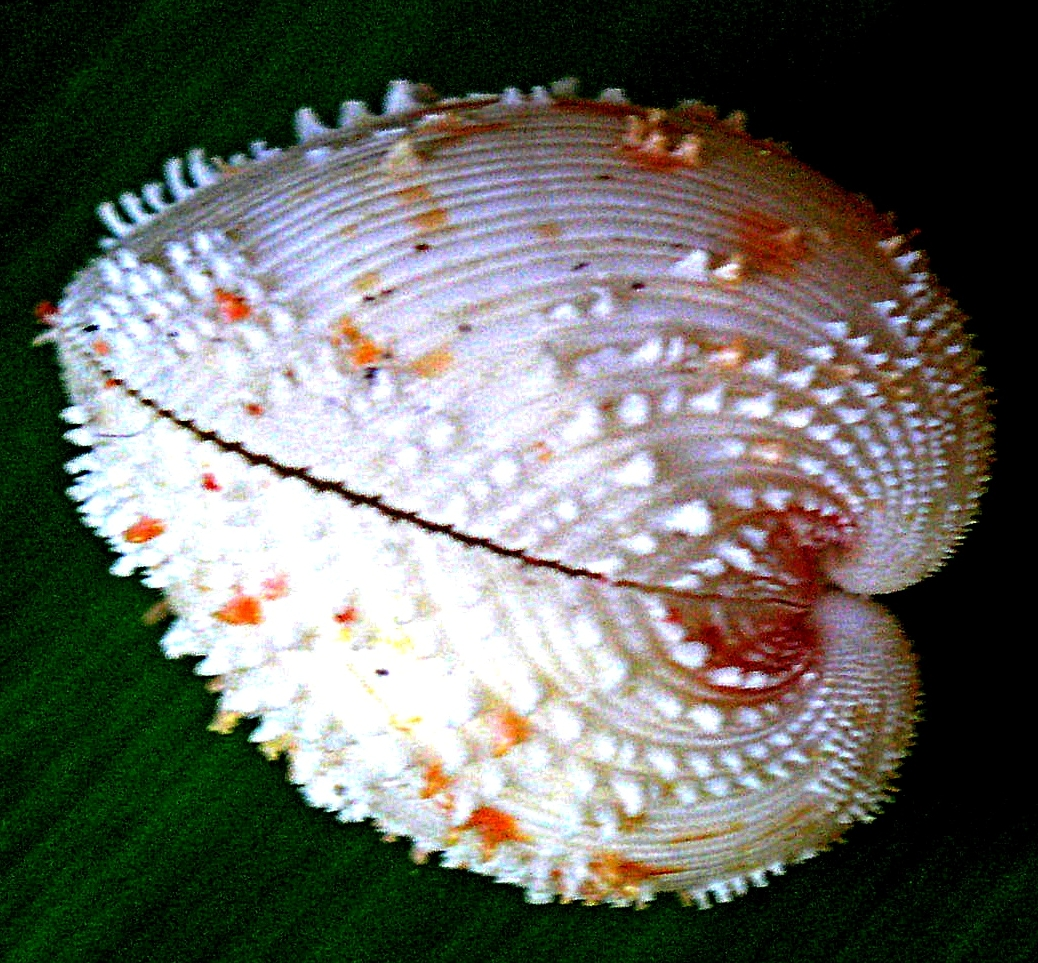
- Shell of a Fragum cockle
  Fragum
  - †Fragum apateticum
  - †Fragum sellardsi – type locality for species
- Fugleria
  - †Fugleria tenera
- †Fulguopsis
  - †Fulguopsis plagosus
- Fulgurofusus
  - †Fulgurofusus evergladensis
  - †Fulgurofusus spiratum
- Fulguropsis
  - †Fulguropsis feldmanni
- †Fulica
  - †Fulica americana
  - †Fulica minor
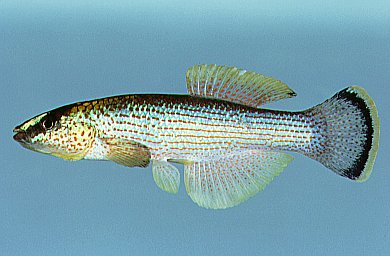
- A living Fundulus
  †Fundulus
- Fusimitra
  - †Fusimitra conquista
- Fusinus
  - †Fusinus ballista
  - †Fusinus capeletti
  - †Fusinus dianeae
  - †Fusinus exilis
  - †Fusinus waltonensis – type locality for species
  - †Fusinus watermani
- Fusiturricula
  - †Fusiturricula condominia
  - †Fusiturricula glaphura – type locality for species
  - †Fusiturricula lapenotierei
  - †Fusiturricula paraservata – type locality for species
  - †Fusiturricula servata – or unidentified related form

== G ==
- Gadila
  - †Gadila clarae
  - †Gadila spiniformis
  - †Gadila volvulus – type locality for species
- Gadilopsis
  - †Gadilopsis spiniformis – type locality for species
- †Gagaria
  - †Gagaria mossomi
- †Galaxea
  - †Galaxea excelsa – type locality for species
- Galeocerdo
  - †Galeocerdo aduncus
  - †Galeocerdo contortis
  - †Galeocerdo contortus
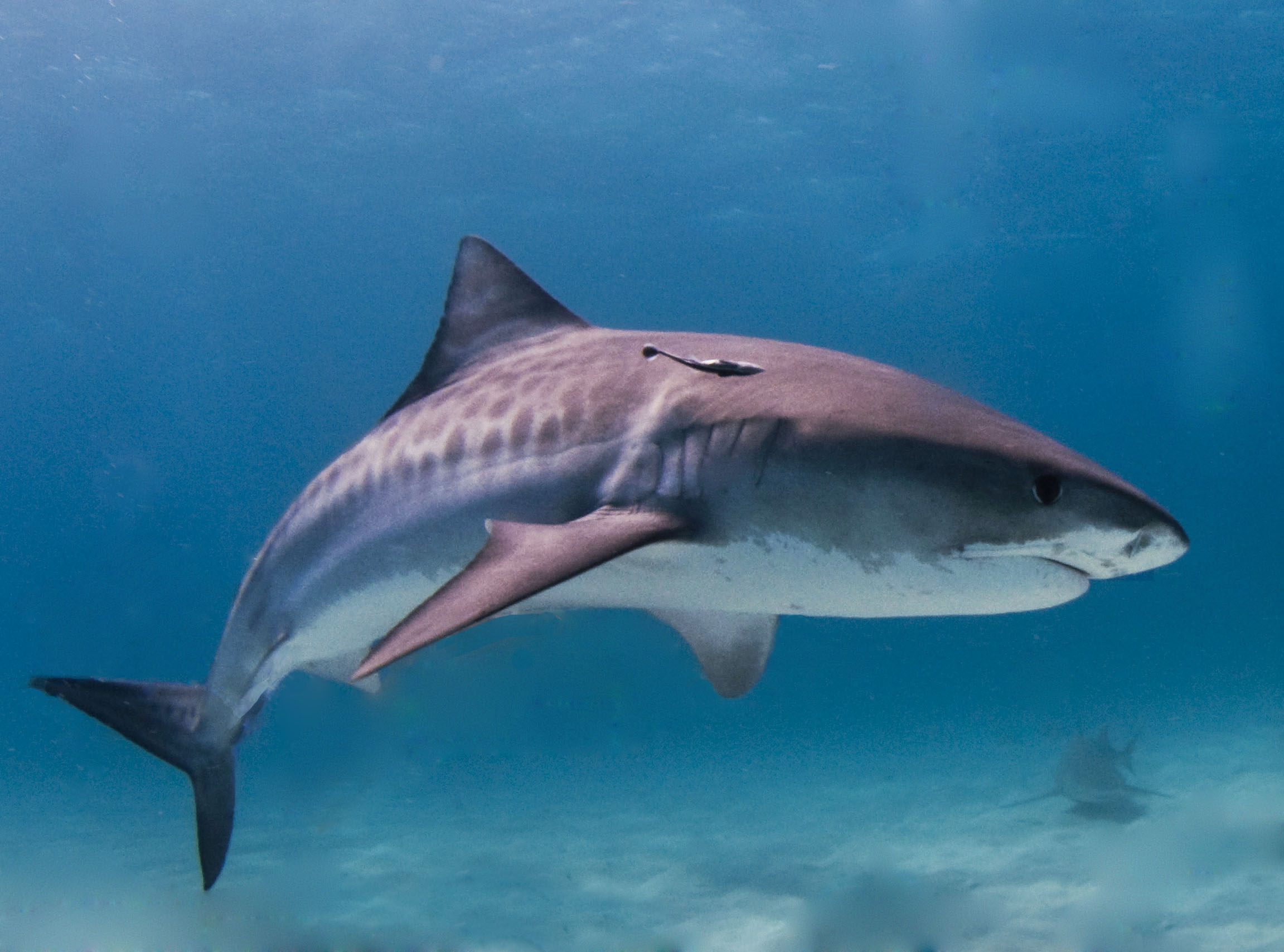
  - A living Galeocerdo cuvier, or tiger shark
    †Galeocerdo cuvier
  - †Galeocerdo cuvieri
  - †Galeocerdo mayumbensis
- Gallinago
  - †Gallinago gallinago
- Gallinula
  - †Gallinula brodkorbi – type locality for species
  - †Gallinula chloropus
- †Gambusia
  - †Gambusia affinis
- Gari
  - †Gari bowdichi – type locality for species
  - †Gari jacksonense
  - †Gari jacksonensis
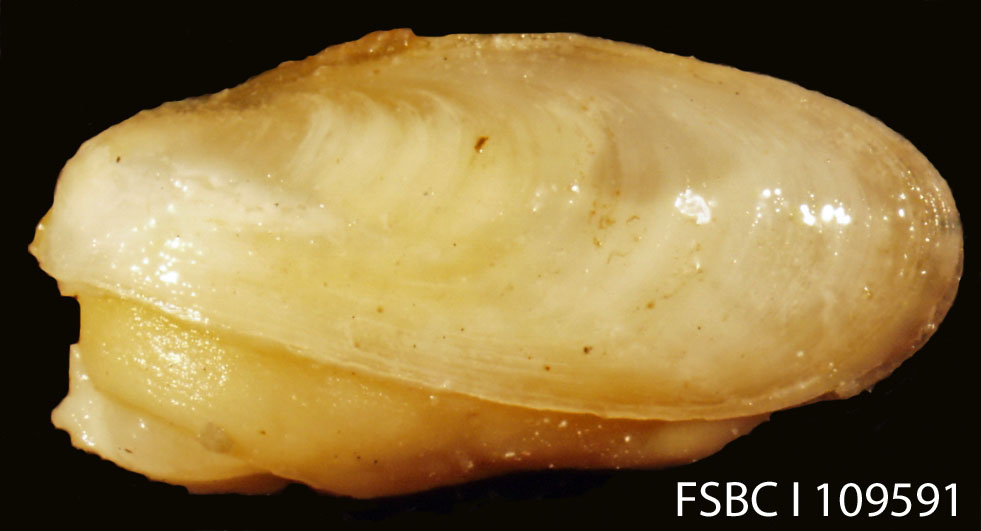
- A Gastrochaena marine bivalve
  Gastrochaena
  - †Gastrochaena cuneiformis
  - †Gastrochaena dodona – type locality for species
  - †Gastrochaena emilyana – type locality for species
  - †Gastrochaena hians
  - †Gastrochaena ligua
  - †Gastrochaena rostrata
  - †Gastrochaena rotunda
- Gastrocopta
  - †Gastrocopta contracta
  - †Gastrocopta pentodon
  - †Gastrocopta rupicola
- Gastrophryne
  - †Gastrophryne carolinensis
- Gaudryina
  - †Gaudryina atlantica
- Gavia
  - †Gavia concinna
  - †Gavia immer
  - †Gavia pacifica
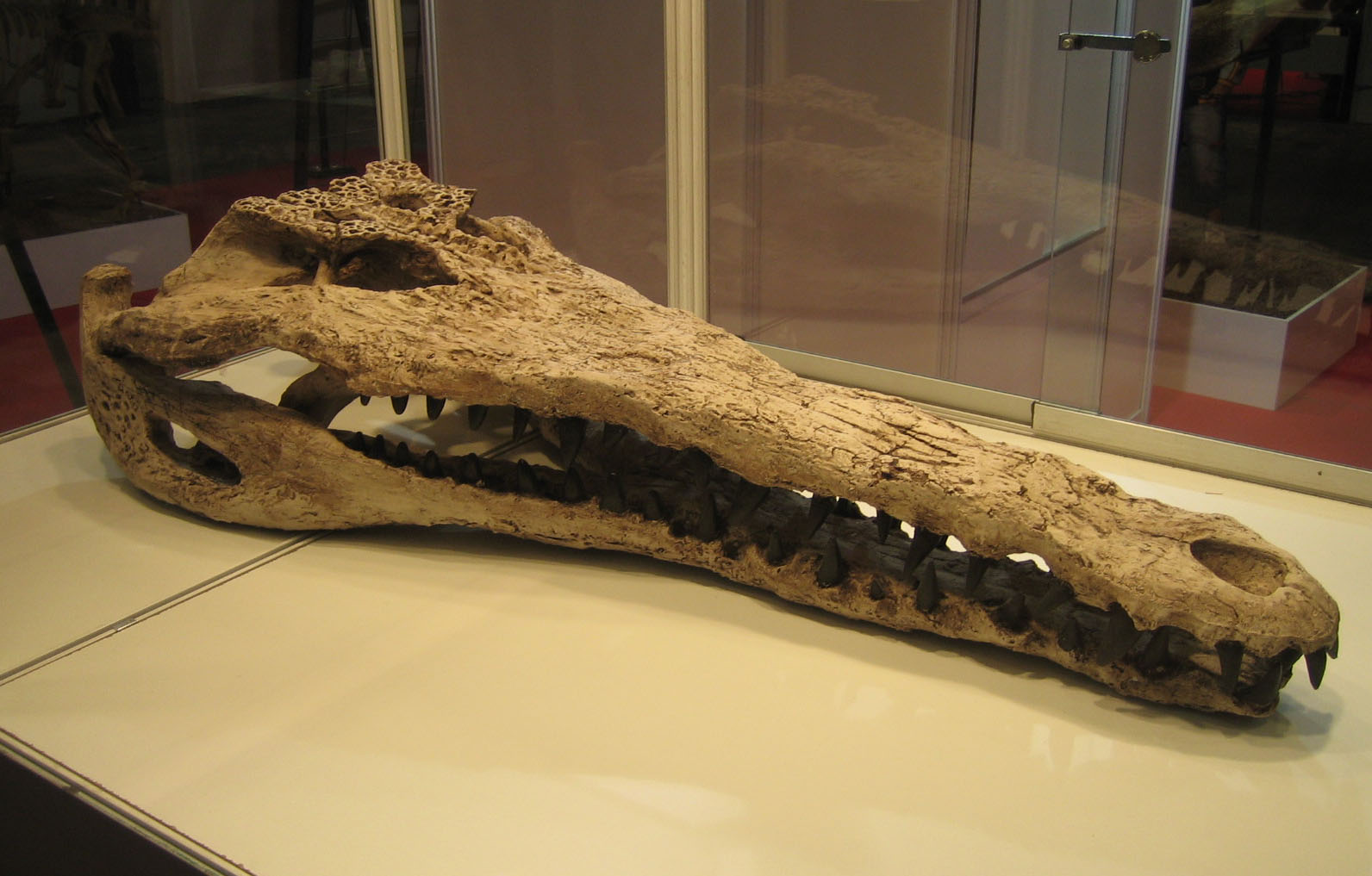
- Fossilized skull of the Miocene crocodile relative Gavialosuchus
  †Gavialosuchus – type locality for genus
  - †Gavialosuchus americana – type locality for species
  - †Gavialosuchus americanus
- Gegania
  - †Gegania acutissima
- †Gelasinostoma
  - †Gelasinostoma chipolanum
  - †Gelasinostoma elegantula
- Gemma
  - †Gemma gemma
  - †Gemma magna
  - †Gemma triquetra
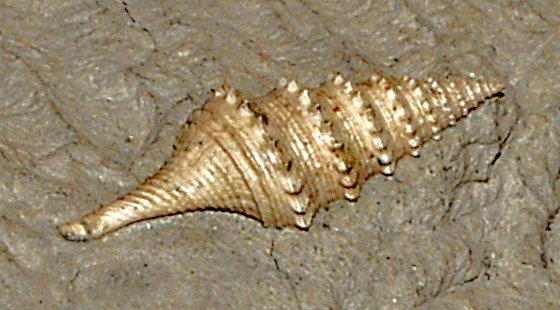
- Fossilized shell of a Gemmula sea snail, or gem turrid
  Gemmula
  - †Gemmula machapoorensis
  - †Gemmula vaningeni – type locality for species
- Gemophos
  - †Gemophos maxwelli
  - †Gemophos tinctus
- Genota
  - †Genota floridana – type locality for species
- †Gentilicamelus – or unidentified comparable form
- Geochelone
  - †Geochelone mlynarskii – type locality for species
  - †Geochelone tedwhitei – type locality for species
- Geomys
  - †Geomys floridanus
  - †Geomys pinetis
- †Geothlypis
  - †Geothlypis trichas
- †Gephrotes
  - †Gephrotes quadriserialis
- Gephyrotes
  - †Gephyrotes quadriserialis
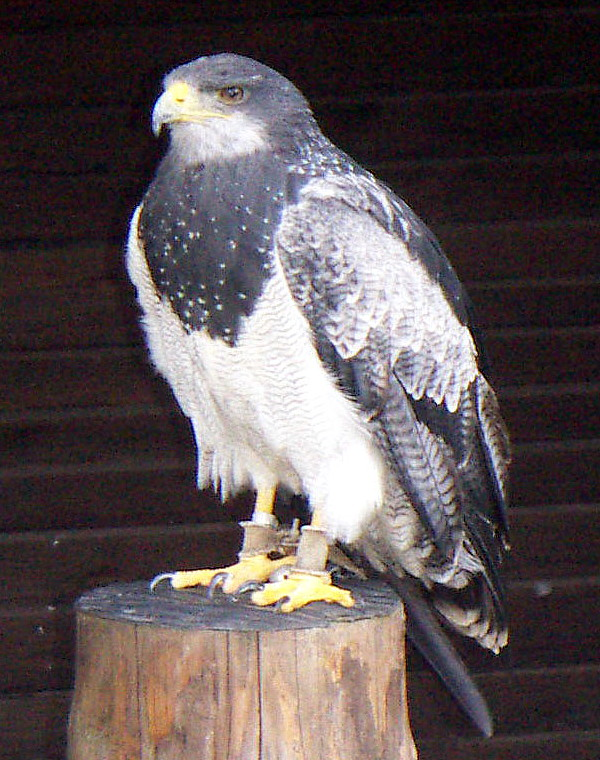
- A living Geranoaetus bird of prey
  Geranoaetus
- †Geringophis
  - †Geringophis robustus – type locality for species
- Gibberula
  - †Gibberula chondra – type locality for species
  - †Gibberula dryados
  - †Gibberula floridana
  - †Gibberula waltoniana – type locality for species
- Gibbolucina
  - †Gibbolucina ocalana
  - †Gibbolucina scolaroi – type locality for species
  - †Gibbolucina xustris – type locality for species
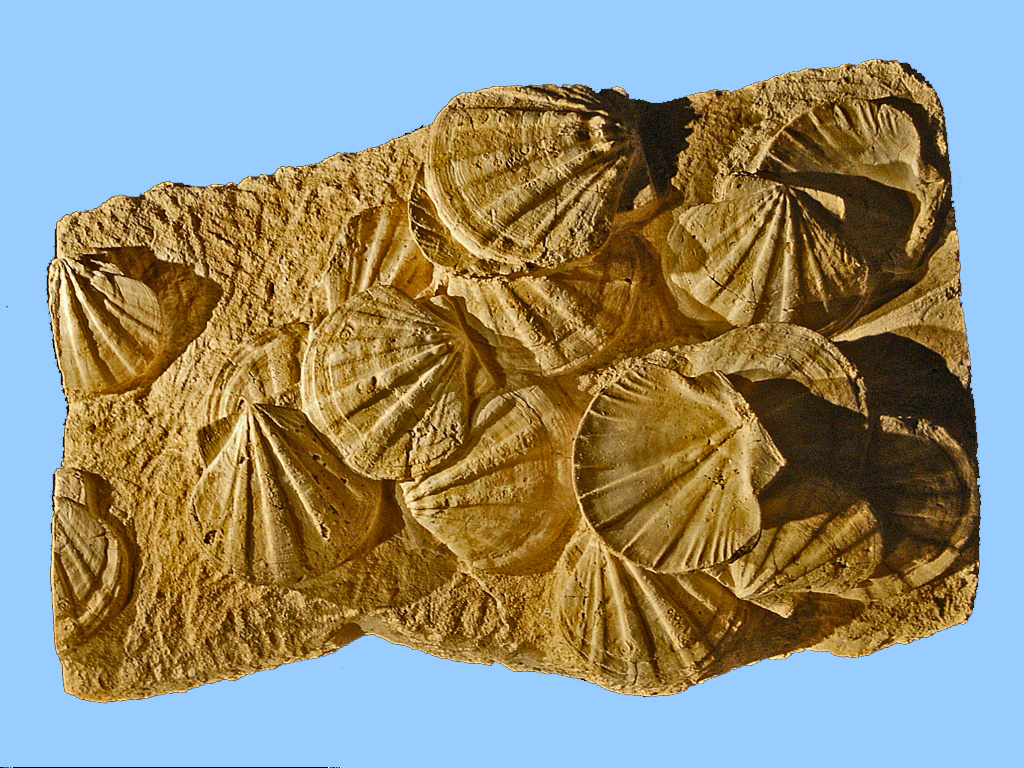
- Fossilized shells of the Oligocene-Pliocene scallop Gigantopecten
  †Gigantopecten
  - †Gigantopecten pittieri
- Gigantopora
  - †Gigantopora cyclops
- †Gigantostrea
  - †Gigantostrea trigonalis
- Ginglymostoma
  - †Ginglymostoma cirratum
- †Gisortia
  - †Gisortia harrisi
- †Glabrocythara
  - †Glabrocythara locklini
- Glans
  - †Glans scabricostata
- Glaucidium
  - †Glaucidium explorator
- Glaucomys
- †Globecphora
  - †Globecphora floridana
- Globicephala
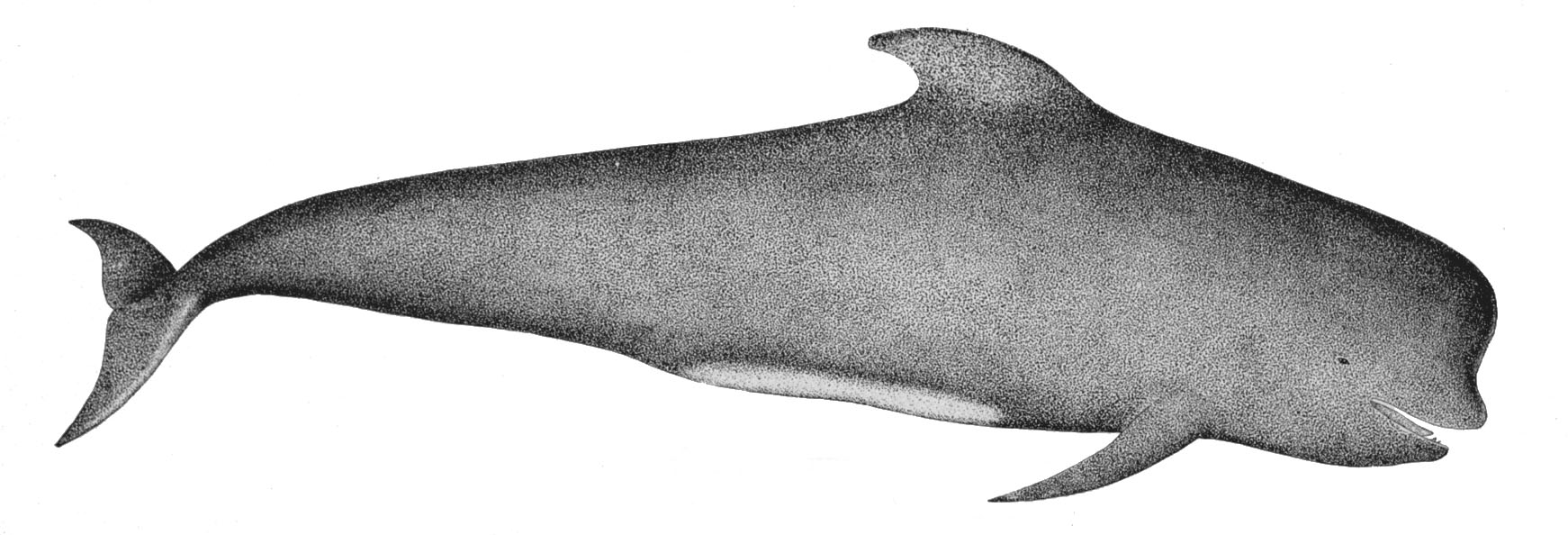
  - Illustration of a living Globicephala macrorhynchus, or short-finned pilot whale
    †Globicephala macrorhynchus – type locality for species
- Globigerina
- †Globinassa
  - †Globinassa floridana
  - †Globinassa roseae
  - †Globinassa schizopyga
- Globivenus
  - †Globivenus rugatina
- Globorotalia
  - †Globorotalia crystalriverensis
- Globularia
  - †Globularia fischeri
  - †Globularia solidula
  - †Globularia streptostoma
- Globulina
  - †Globulina gibba
  - †Globulina inaequalis
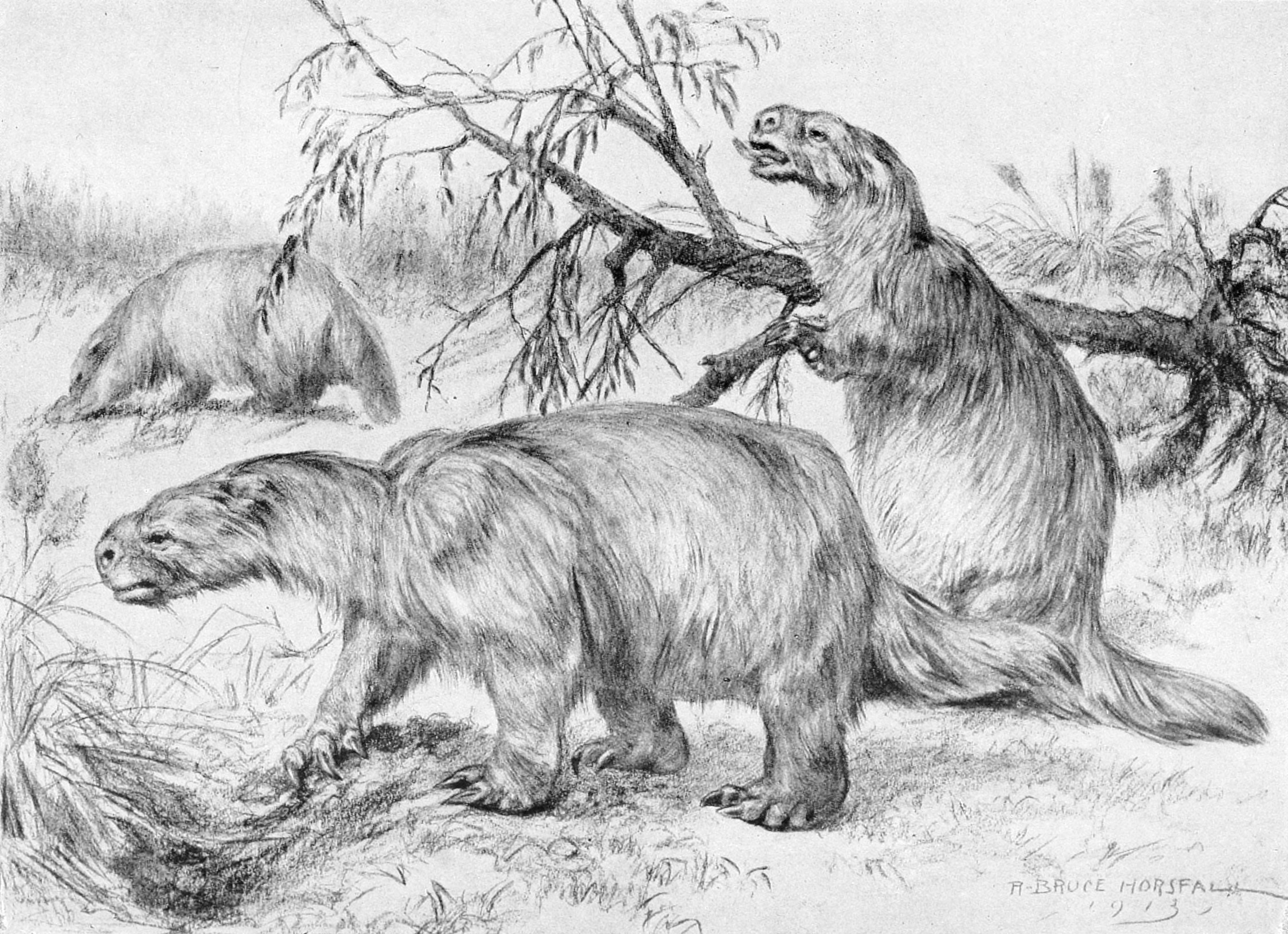
- Restoration of a herd of the Pliocene-Holocene ground sloth Glossotherium
  †Glossotherium
  - †Glossotherium chapadmalense
  - †Glossotherium garbanii
- Glycymeris
  - †Glycymeris americana
  - †Glycymeris decussata
  - †Glycymeris gadsdenensis
  - †Glycymeris hillsboroughensis – tentative report
  - †Glycymeris lisbonensis
  - †Glycymeris suwannensis
  - †Glycymeris tuckerae – tentative report
  - †Glycymeris waltonense
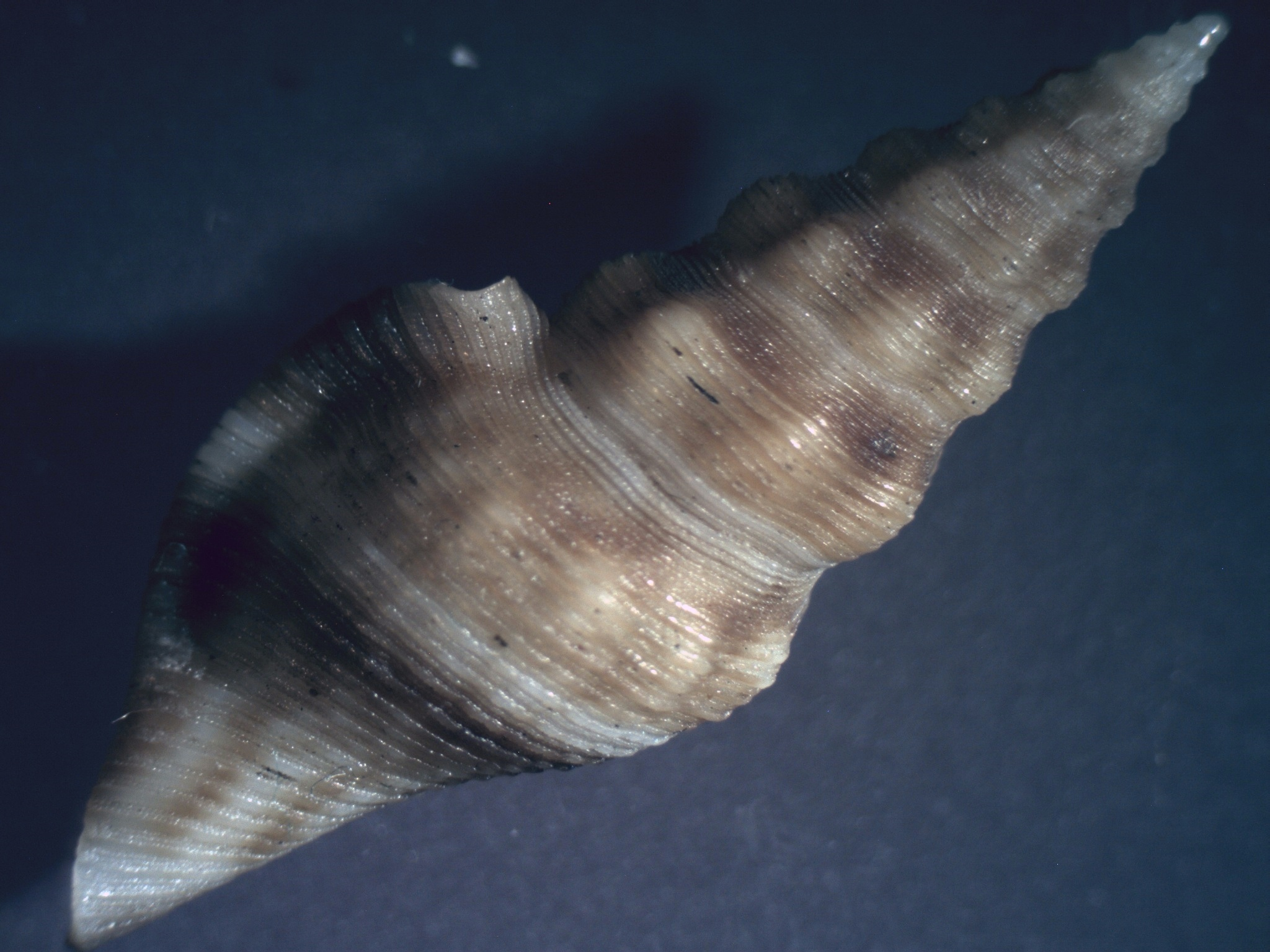
- Shell of a Glyphostoma sea snail
  Glyphostoma
  - †Glyphostoma aldrichi
  - †Glyphostoma belonoides – type locality for species
  - †Glyphostoma celosia
  - †Glyphostoma chipolanum – type locality for species
  - †Glyphostoma harrisi – type locality for species
  - †Glyphostoma ischnon – type locality for species
  - †Glyphostoma marionae
  - †Glyphostoma nannophues – type locality for species
  - †Glyphostoma perieilema
  - †Glyphostoma polysculptum
  - †Glyphostoma sapita
  - †Glyphostoma scoptes
  - †Glyphostoma tiarophoron – type locality for species
  - †Glyphostoma tryphonoides
  - †Glyphostoma typhon
  - †Glyphostoma watsoni
  - †Glyphostoma woodringi
  - †Glyphostoma xeston – type locality for species
- Glyphostomops
  - †Glyphostomops pinellasensis
- Glyphyalinia
  - †Glyphyalinia indentata
- †Glyptanatica
  - †Glyptanatica caractica
  - †Glyptanatica euglypta – type locality for species
- Glyptoactis
  - †Glyptoactis hadra
  - †Glyptoactis himerta
  - †Glyptoactis serricosta
- †Glyptotherium
  - †Glyptotherium arizonae
  - †Glyptotherium floridanum – type locality for species
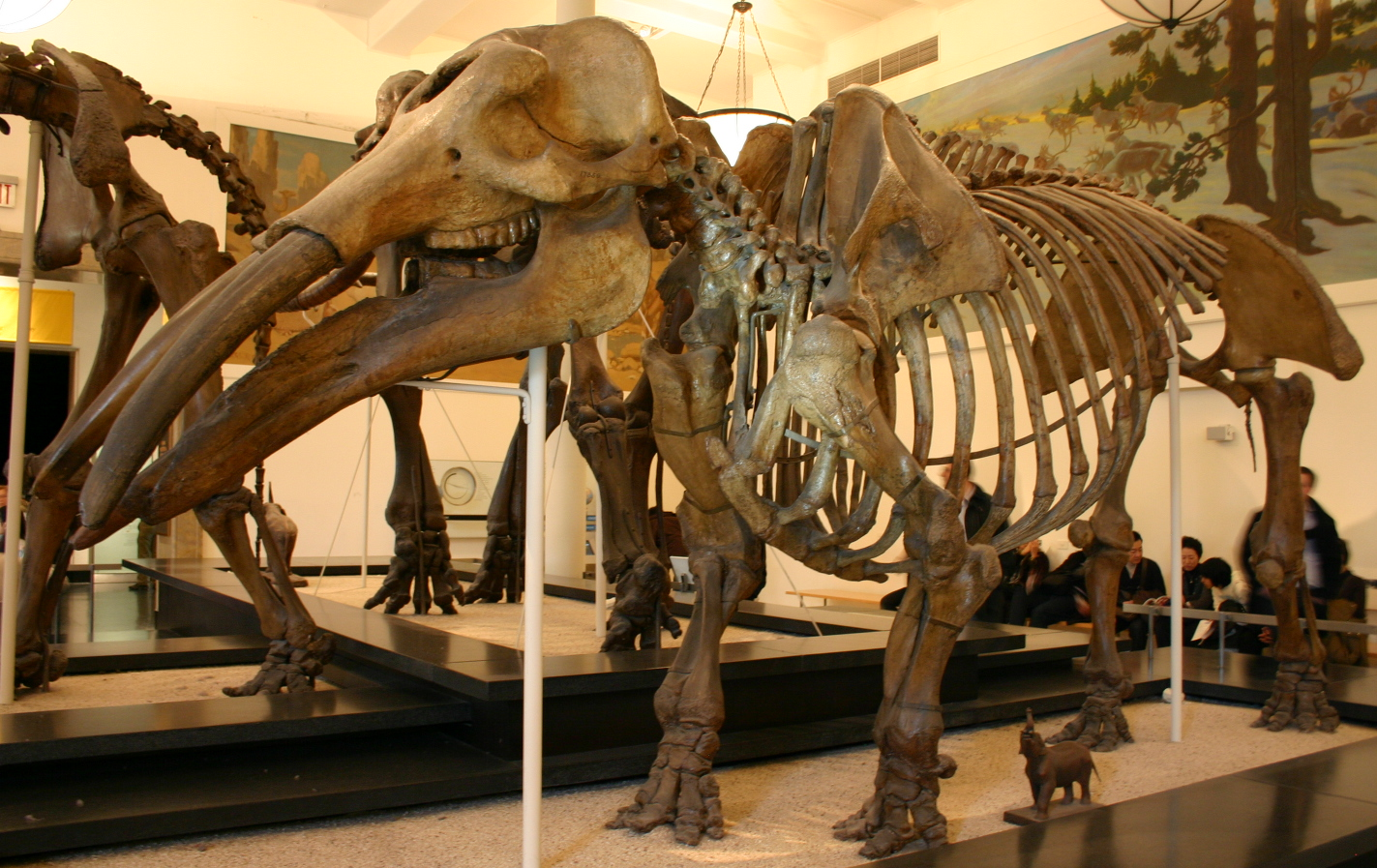
- Mounted fossilized skeleton of the Miocene-Pleistocene elephant relative Gomphotherium
  †Gomphotherium
  - †Gomphotherium obscurum – or unidentified comparable form
  - †Gomphotherium simplicidens
- †Goneavus
- †Goniodelphis – type locality for genus
  - †Goniodelphis hudsoni – type locality for species
- Goniopora
  - †Goniopora aucillana – type locality for species
  - †Goniopora ballistensis – type locality for species
  - †Goniopora calhounensis – type locality for species
  - †Goniopora decaturensis – or unidentified comparable form
  - †Goniopora jacobiana
  - †Goniopora matsoni – type locality for species
  - †Goniopora tampaensis – type locality for species
- Gopherus
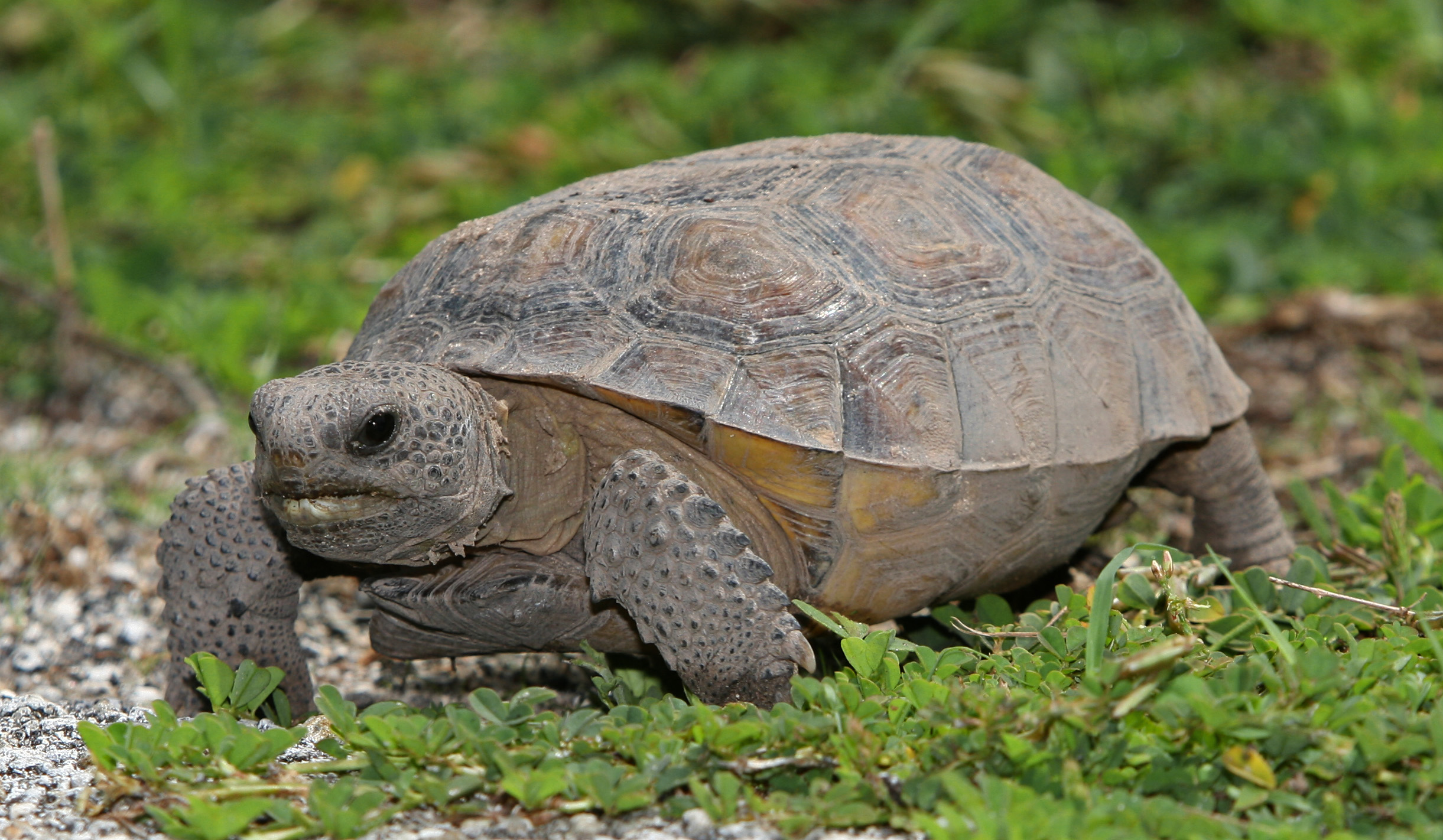
  - A living Gopherus polyphemus, or gopher tortoise
    †Gopherus polyphemus
- Gouldia
  - †Gouldia alta
  - †Gouldia cerina
  - †Gouldia costaricensis – type locality for species
  - †Gouldia erosum
  - †Gouldia floridana
  - †Gouldia metastriata
  - †Gouldia metastriatum
  - †Gouldia phacota
- †Granoturris
  - †Granoturris padolina
- Granulina
  - †Granulina defuniak
  - †Granulina ovuliformis
- Graptemys
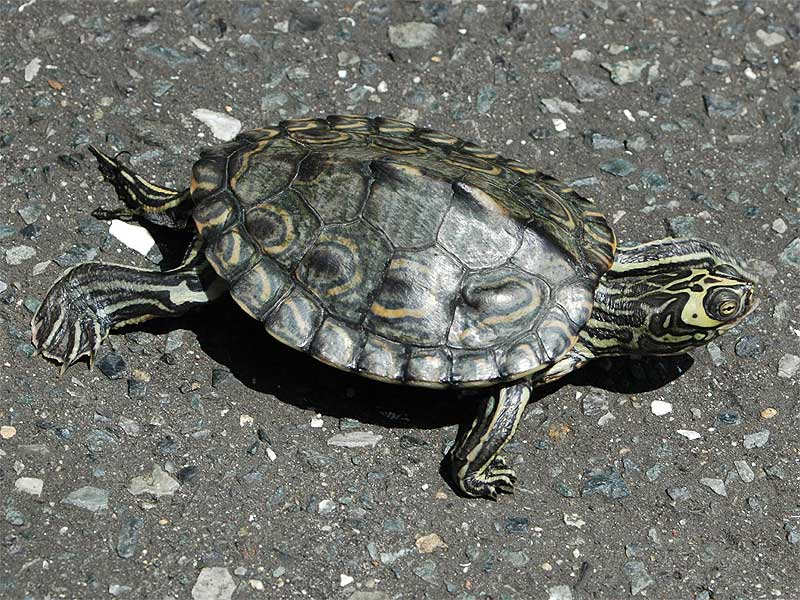
  - A living Graptemys barbouri, or Barbour's map turtle
    †Graptemys barbouri – or unidentified comparable form
- Gregariella
  - †Gregariella coralliophaga
- Grus
  - †Grus americana
  - †Grus canadensis
- †Guara
  - †Guara alba
- Guttulina
  - †Guttulina caudata
  - †Guttulina lactea
- Gymnogyps
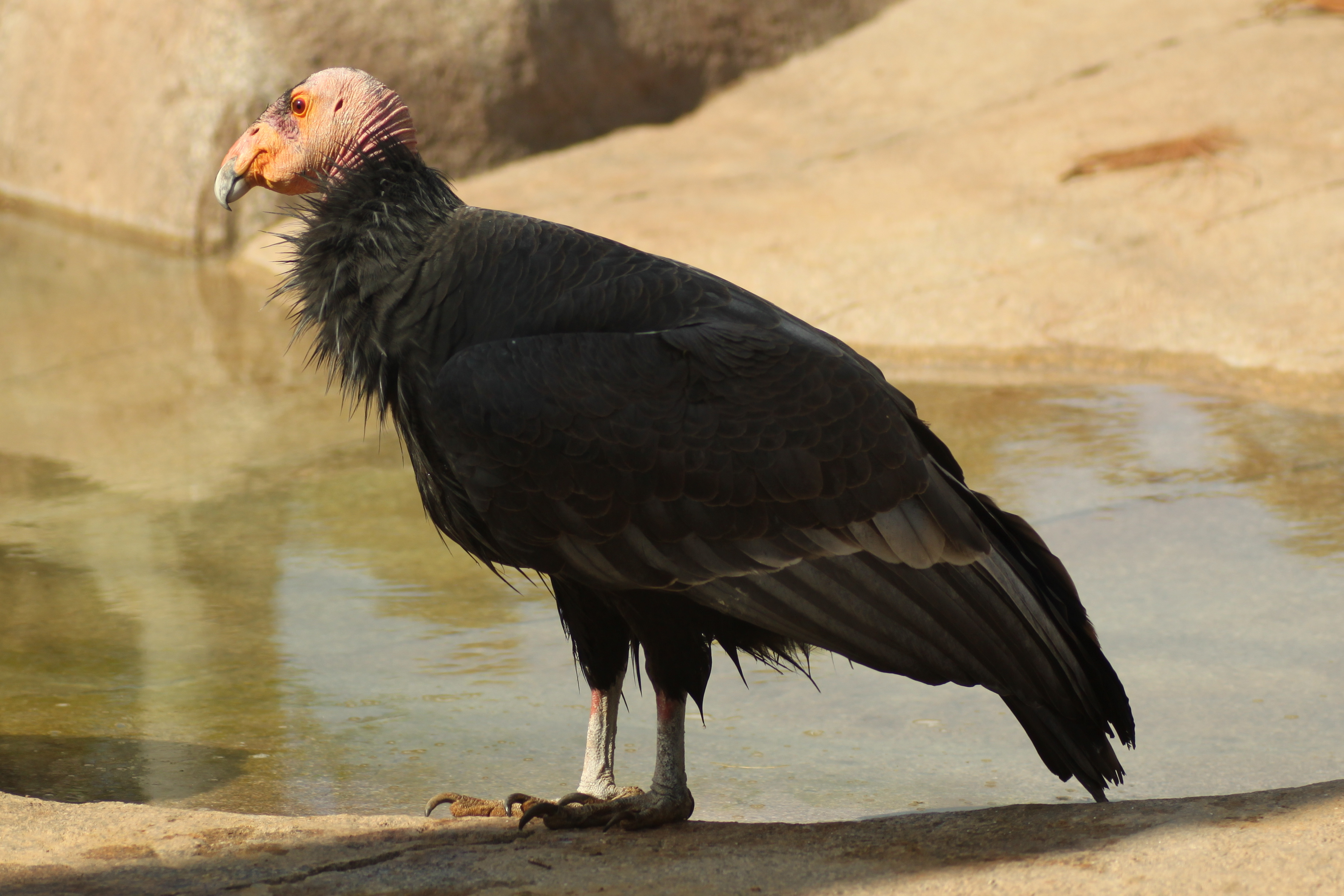
  - A living Gymnogyps californianus, or California condor
    †Gymnogyps californianus
  - †Gymnogyps californicus
  - †Gymnogyps kofordi – type locality for species
- Gypsina
  - †Gypsina globula
- Gyraulus
  - †Gyraulus parvus

== H ==
- †Hadrodelphis
- Haematopus – type locality for genus
  - †Haematopus palliatus – type locality for species
- Haemulon
- Haliaeetus
  - †Haliaeetus leucocephalus
- †Haliaetus
  - †Haliaetus leucocephalus
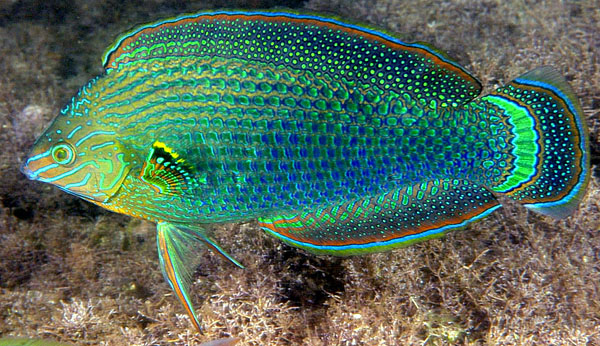
- A living Halichoeres wrasse
  †Halichoeres
- †Halimeda
- Halodule
- Haminoea
  - †Haminoea pompholyx
  - †Haminoea sulcobasis
- Hanetia
  - †Hanetia mengeana
  - †Hanetia vaughani
- Haplocytheridea
  - †Haplocytheridea bassleri
- Harengula
- †Harrymys
  - †Harrymys magnus
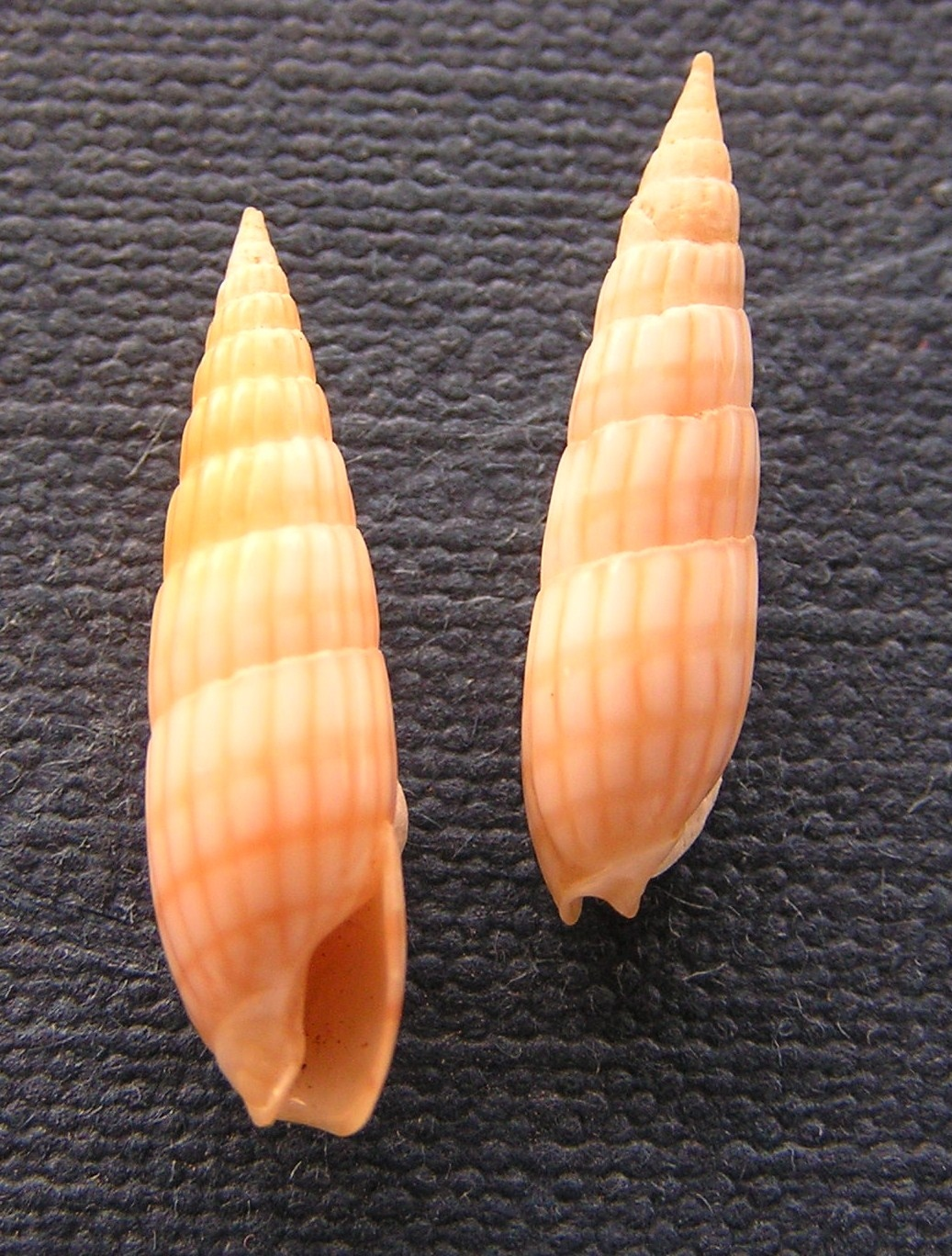
- Shells in differing orientations of Hastula augur sea snails
  Hastula
  - †Hastula cinerea
- Haustellum
  - †Haustellum gilli
  - †Haustellum messorium
  - †Haustellum rubidum
- Hawaiia
  - †Hawaiia minuscule
- Hebetoncylus
  - †Hebetoncylus excentricus
- Heilprinia
  - †Heilprinia caloosaensis
  - †Heilprinia carolinensis
  - †Heilprinia dalli
  - †Heilprinia gunteri
  - †Heilprinia hasta
- Heliaster
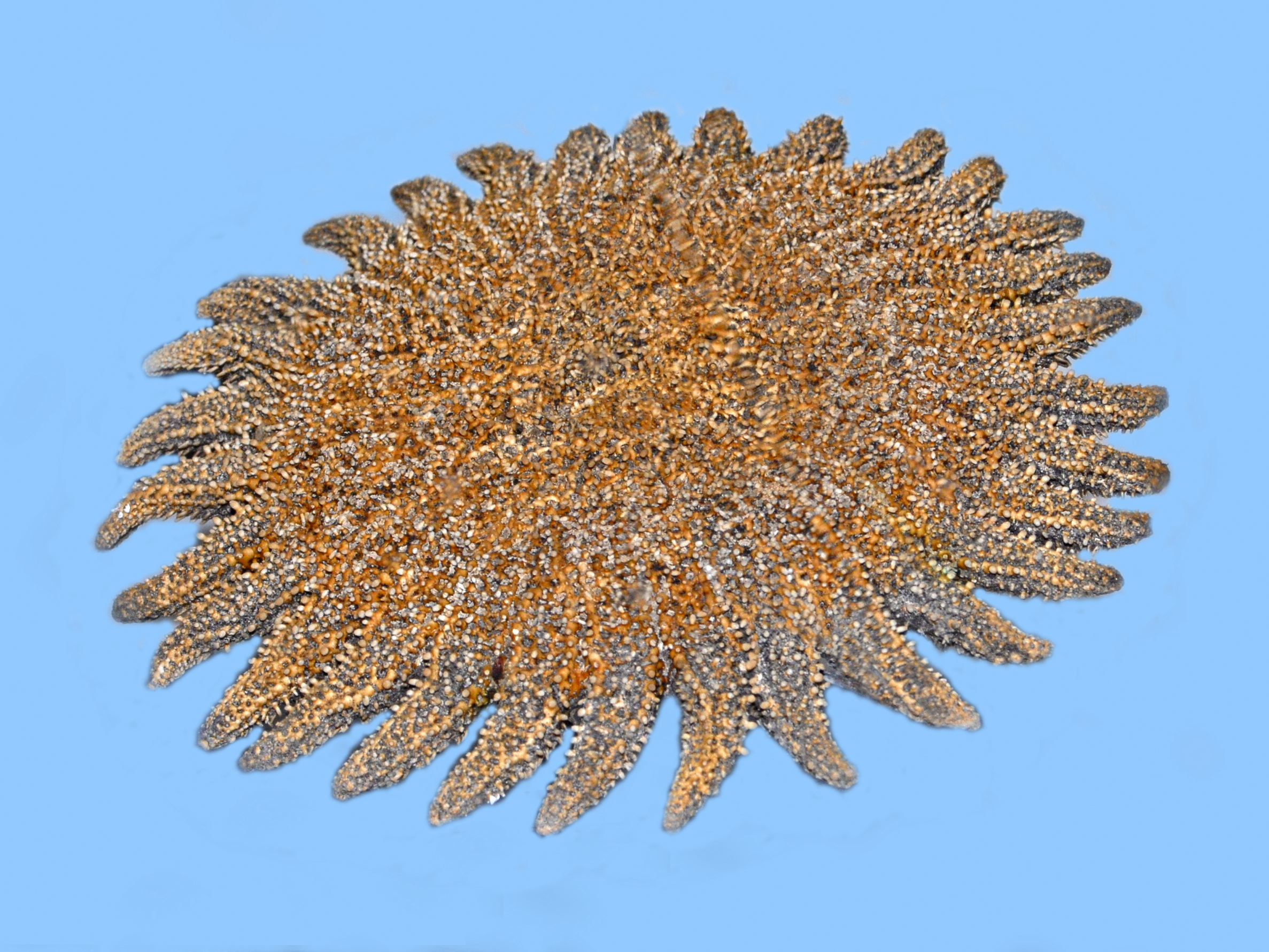
  - A preserved Heliaster microbrachius sea star
    †Heliaster microbrachius
- Helicina
  - †Helicina ballista
  - †Helicina posti
- †Heliscomys
- Helisoma
  - †Helisoma conanta
  - †Helisoma conanti
  - †Helisoma disstoni
  - †Helisoma scalare
- Heloderma – tentative report
- †Helonetta – type locality for genus
  - †Helonetta brodkorbi – type locality for species
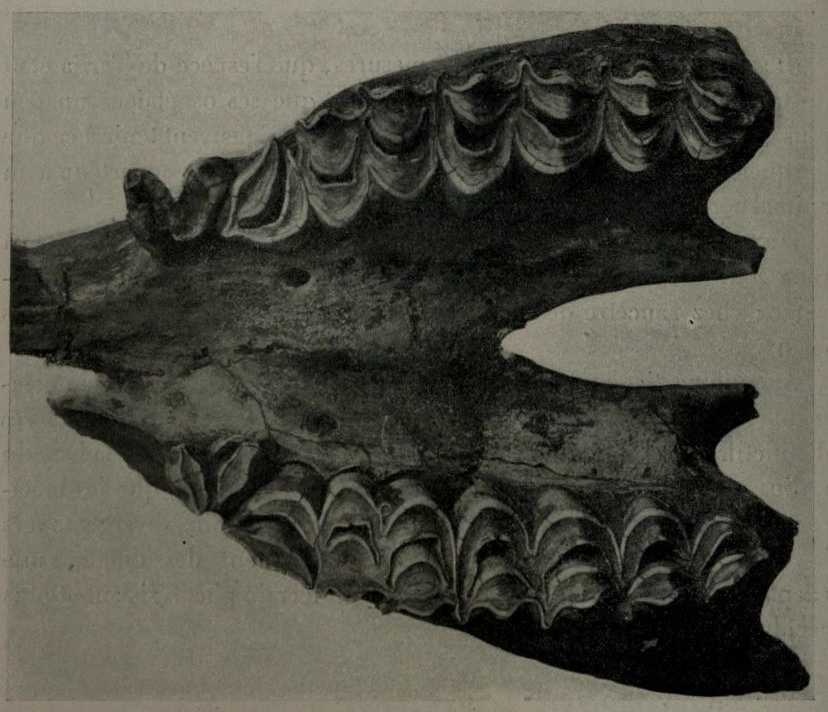
- Fossilized lower jaw of the Miocene-Pleistocene llama relative Hemiauchenia
  †Hemiauchenia
  - †Hemiauchenia gracilis – type locality for species
  - †Hemiauchenia macrocephala
  - †Hemiauchenia minima
- Hemicerithium
  - †Hemicerithium akriton – type locality for species
  - †Hemicerithium cossmanni
  - †Hemicerithium craticulum – type locality for species
  - †Hemicerithium pagodum – type locality for species
- Hemicythere
- Hemimactra
  - †Hemimactra craspeota
  - †Hemimactra densa
  - †Hemimactra dodona
  - †Hemimactra solidissima
  - †Hemimactra solidissina
  - †Hemimactra solidssima
  - †Hemimactra subparilis
- Hemimetis
  - †Hemimetis magnoliana
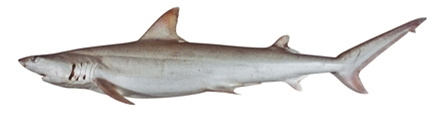
- A living Hemipristis weasel shark
  Hemipristis
  - †Hemipristis serra
  - †Hemipristis wyattdurhami – or unidentified comparable form
- Here
  - †Here densatus
  - †Here glenni
  - †Here wacissana – or unidentified comparable form
- †Herodias
  - †Herodias egretta
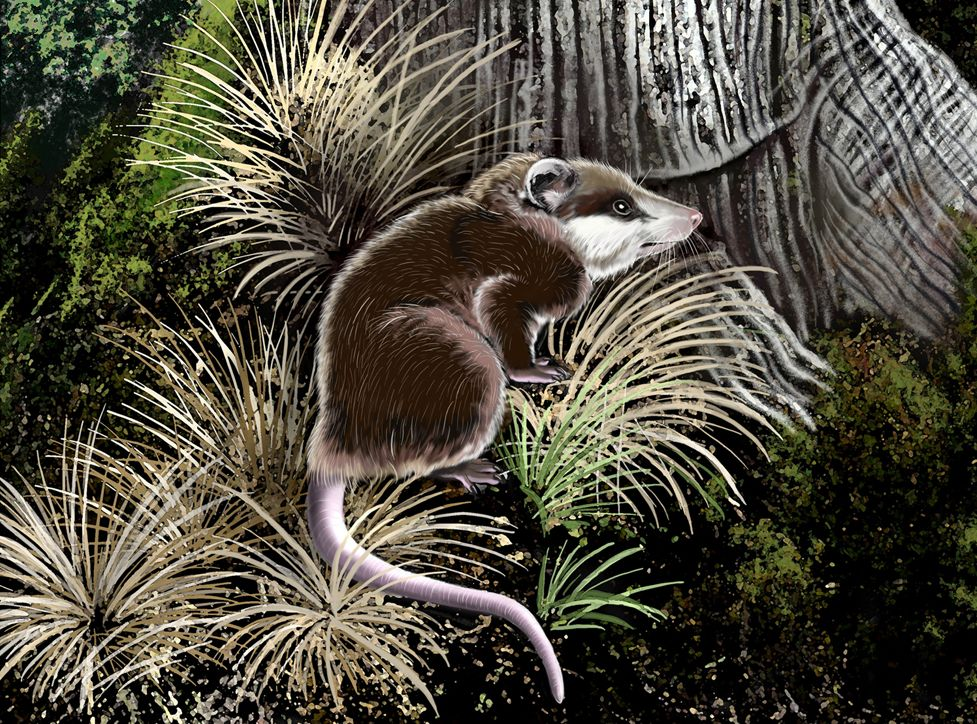
- Life restoration of the Eocene-Miocene mammal Herpetotherium
  †Herpetotherium
- Hespererato
  - †Hespererato chipolana – type locality for species
  - †Hespererato maugeriae
- †Hesperisterinia
  - †Hesperisterinia filicata
- Hesperisternia
  - †Hesperisternia chipolana – type locality for species
  - †Hesperisternia miamiensis
  - †Hesperisternia multangulus
  - †Hesperisternia waltonia – type locality for species
  - †Hesperisternia waltonianum
- †Hesperotestudo
  - †Hesperotestudo alleni – type locality for species
  - †Hesperotestudo crassicutata
  - †Hesperotestudo crassiscutata
  - †Hesperotestudo incisa
  - †Hesperotestudo mlynarsii
  - †Hesperotestudo mlynarskii
  - †Hesperotestudo turgida – or unidentified comparable form
- Heterodon
  - †Heterodon brevis – type locality for species
  - †Heterodon platyrhinos
  - †Heterodon simus
- Heterostegina
  - †Heterostegina ocalana
- †Hexameryx – type locality for genus
  - †Hexameryx simpsoni – type locality for species
- Hexaplex
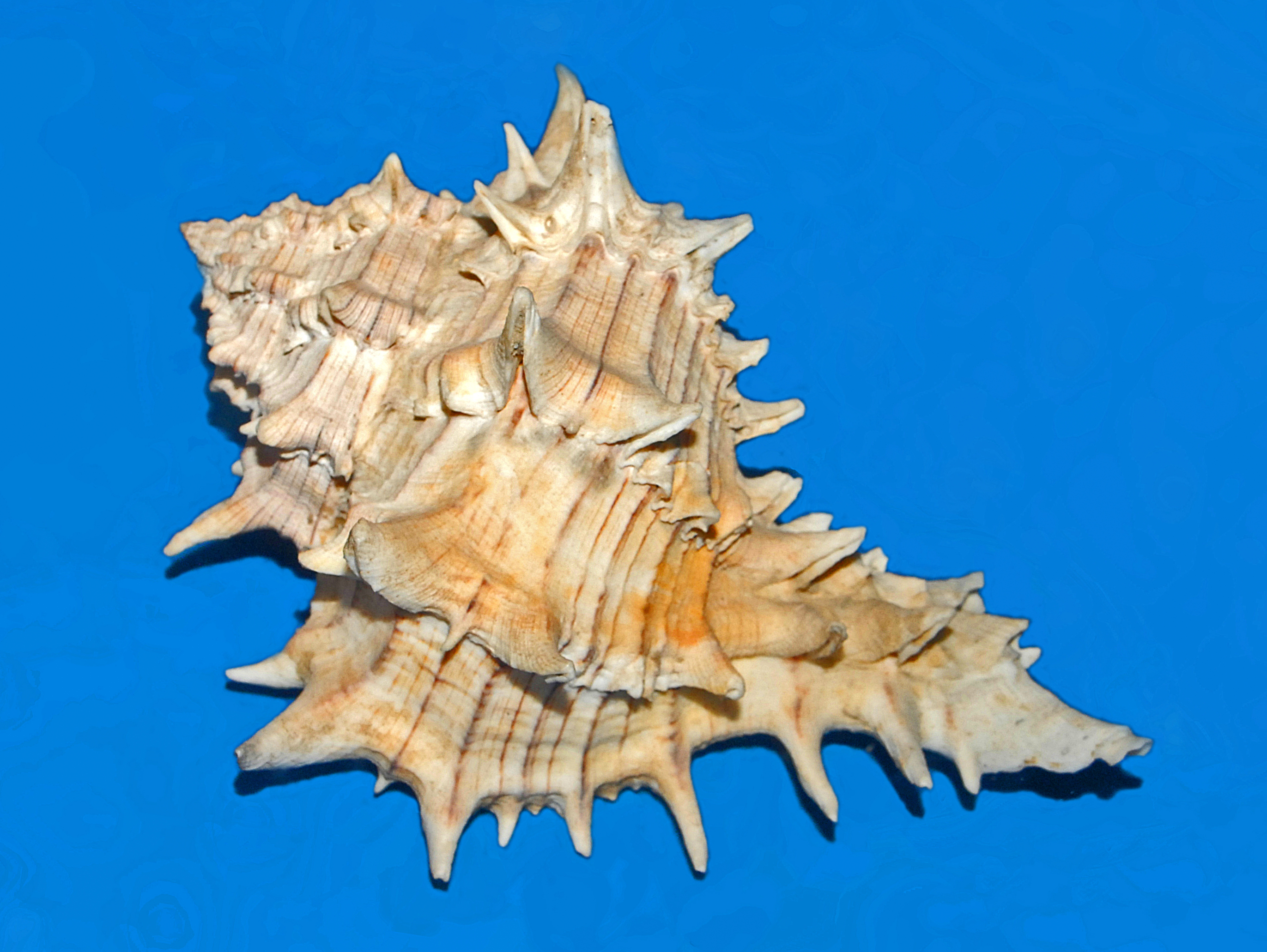
  - A Shell of Hexaplex fulvescens from the Antilles
    †Hexaplex fulvescens
  - †Hexaplex hertweckorum
  - †Hexaplex jameshoubricki
  - †Hexaplex trippae
  - †Hexaplex veatchi – type locality for species
- Hiatella
  - †Hiatella arctica
- Himantopus
- Himerometra
  - †Himerometra bassleri
- Hincksina
  - †Hincksina bilaminaria – type locality for species
  - †Hincksina ocalensis
- Hindsia
  - †Hindsia pyta
- Hindsiclava
  - †Hindsiclava antealesidota
  - †Hindsiclava calligonoides – type locality for species
  - †Hindsiclava eupora
  - †Hindsiclava perspirata
- †Hindsiella
  - †Hindsiella nephritica
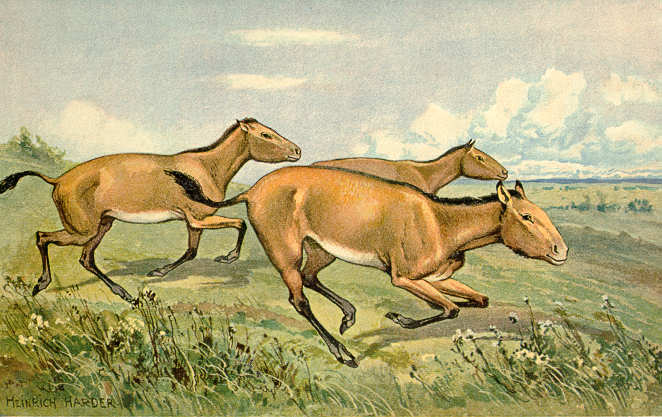
- Life restoration of a herd of the Miocene-Pleistocene horse Hipparion. Heinrich Harder (1920).
  †Hipparion
  - †Hipparion tehonense – or unidentified comparable form
- Hipponix
  - †Hipponix ceras
  - †Hipponix floridana
  - †Hipponix floridanus – type locality for species
  - †Hipponix levinus
  - †Hipponix tampensis
  - †Hipponix willcoxii
- Hippopleurifera
  - †Hippopleurifera costulata
  - †Hippopleurifera crassicollis
  - †Hippopleurifera incondita
  - †Hippopleurifera ligulata
  - †Hippopleurifera moodysbranchensis
  - †Hippopleurifera punctata
  - †Hippopleurifera radicata
- Hippopodina
  - †Hippopodina vibraculifera
- Hippoporidra
  - †Hippoporidra calcarea
- Hippoporina
  - †Hippoporina lucens
- †Hippotherium
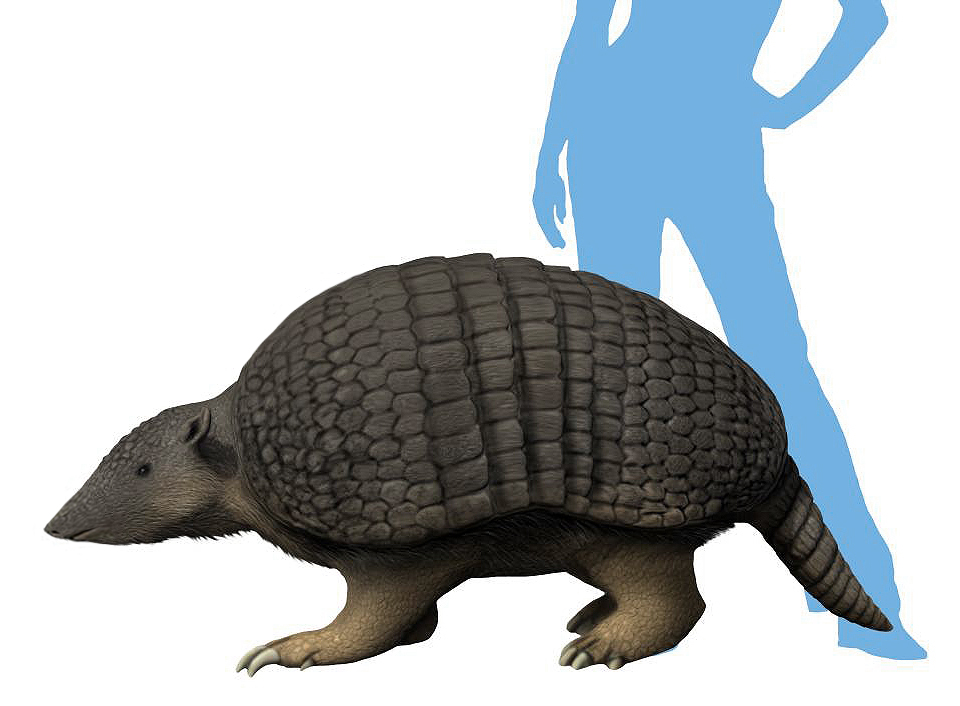
- Life restoration of the Pleistocene armadillo relative Holmesina with a human to scale
  †Holmesina
  - †Holmesina floridanus
  - †Holmesina septentrionalis
- †Homiphoca
  - †Homiphoca capensis
- Homo
  - †Homo sapiens
- †Homotherium
  - †Homotherium serum
- †Hoplictis
- Hulingsina
  - †Hulingsina ashermani
- †Humboldtiana – tentative report
  - †Humboldtiana tuckerae
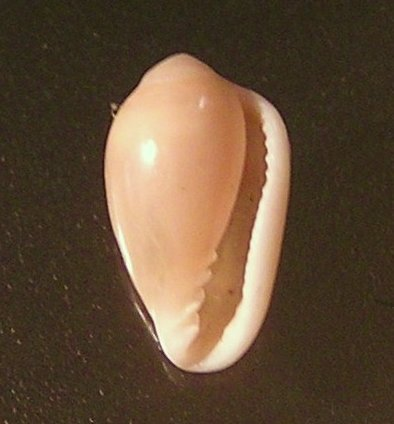
- Shell of a Hyalina margin sea snail
  Hyalina
  - †Hyalina brithia – type locality for species
  - †Hyalina chipolana
  - †Hyalina coloba
  - †Hyalina critha – type locality for species
  - †Hyalina denticulatoides
  - †Hyalina elegantula
  - †Hyalina euancycla – type locality for species
  - †Hyalina eurystoma – type locality for species
  - †Hyalina impagina
  - †Hyalina nanna – type locality for species
  - †Hyalina newmani
  - †Hyalina silicicifluvia
  - †Hyalina vadosa – type locality for species
  - †Hyalina xanthophaes – type locality for species
- †Hyalinonetrion
  - †Hyalinonetrion clavatum
- †Hyalopyrgus
  - †Hyalopyrgus aequicostatus
- †Hydranassa
  - †Hydranassa tricolor
- Hydrobia – report made of unidentified related form or using admittedly obsolete nomenclature
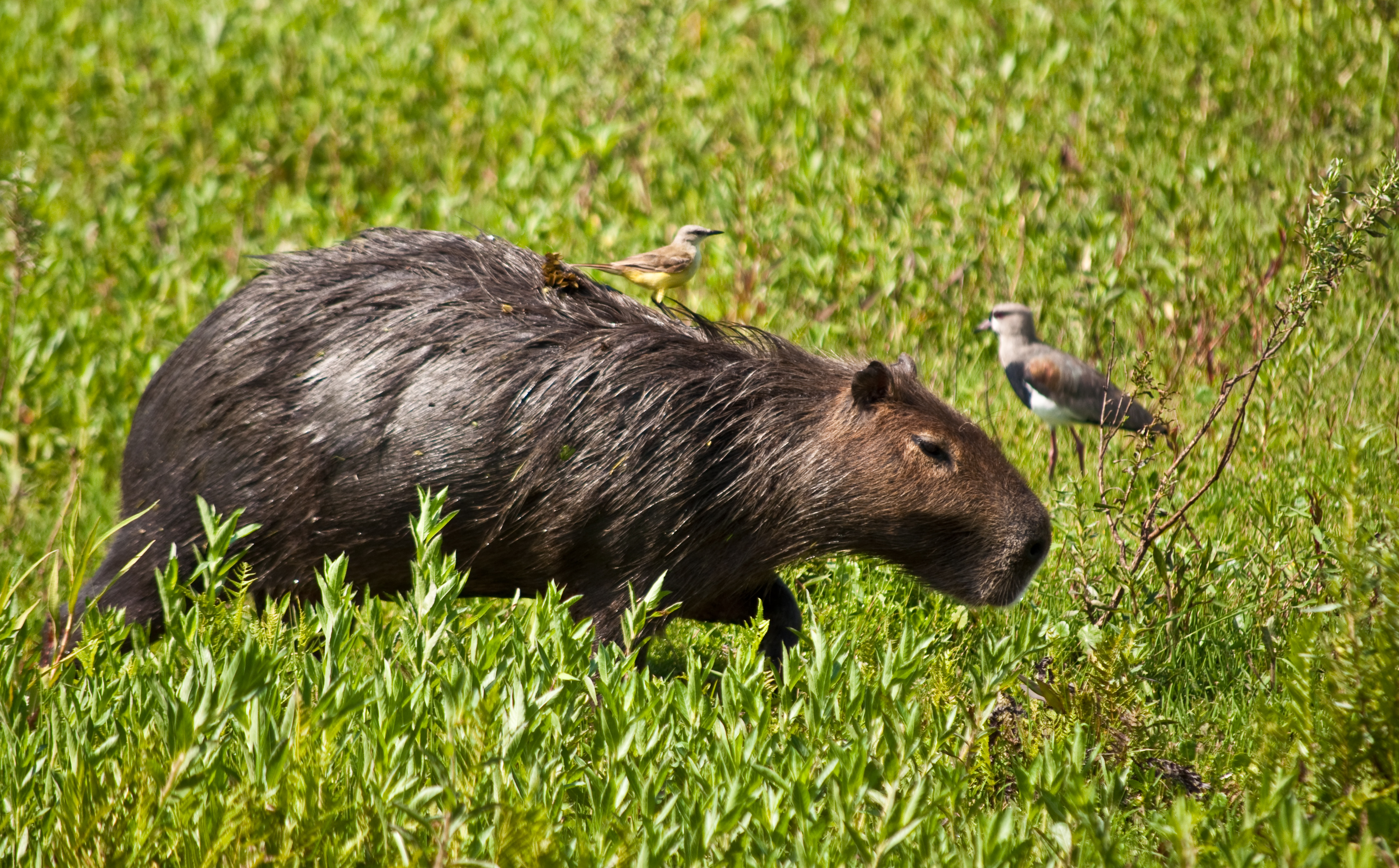
- A living Hydrochoerus, or capybara
  Hydrochoerus
  - †Hydrochoerus pinckneyi – or unidentified comparable form
- Hyla
  - †Hyla baderi – type locality for species
  - †Hyla cinerea
  - †Hyla femoralis
  - †Hyla goini – type locality for species
  - †Hyla gratiosa
- Hylocichla – or unidentified comparable form
  - †Hylocichla mustelina
- Hyotissa
  - †Hyotissa haitensis – type locality for species
  - †Hyotissa meridionalis
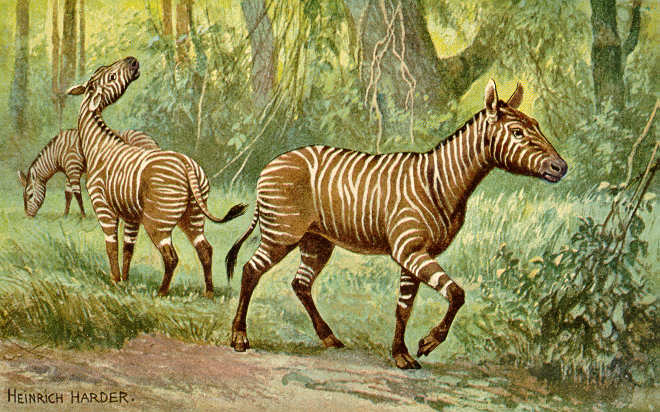
- Life restoration of the Miocene horse Hypohippus. Heinrich Harder (1920).
  †Hypohippus
  - †Hypohippus affinis – or unidentified comparable form
  - †Hypohippus chico
- †Hypolagus
  - †Hypolagus ringoldensis
  - †Hypolagus tedfordi – or unidentified comparable form
- Hysteroconcha
  - †Hysteroconcha cypta
  - †Hysteroconcha harrisi

== I ==
- Ictalurus
  - †Ictalurus catus – or unidentified comparable form
- Ilex
  - †Ilex glabra
- Ilyanassa
  - †Ilyanassa arata
  - †Ilyanassa corbis
  - †Ilyanassa floridana
  - †Ilyanassa granifera
  - †Ilyanassa marthae
  - †Ilyanassa palmbeachensis
  - †Ilyanassa scalaspira
  - †Ilyanassa wilmingtonensis
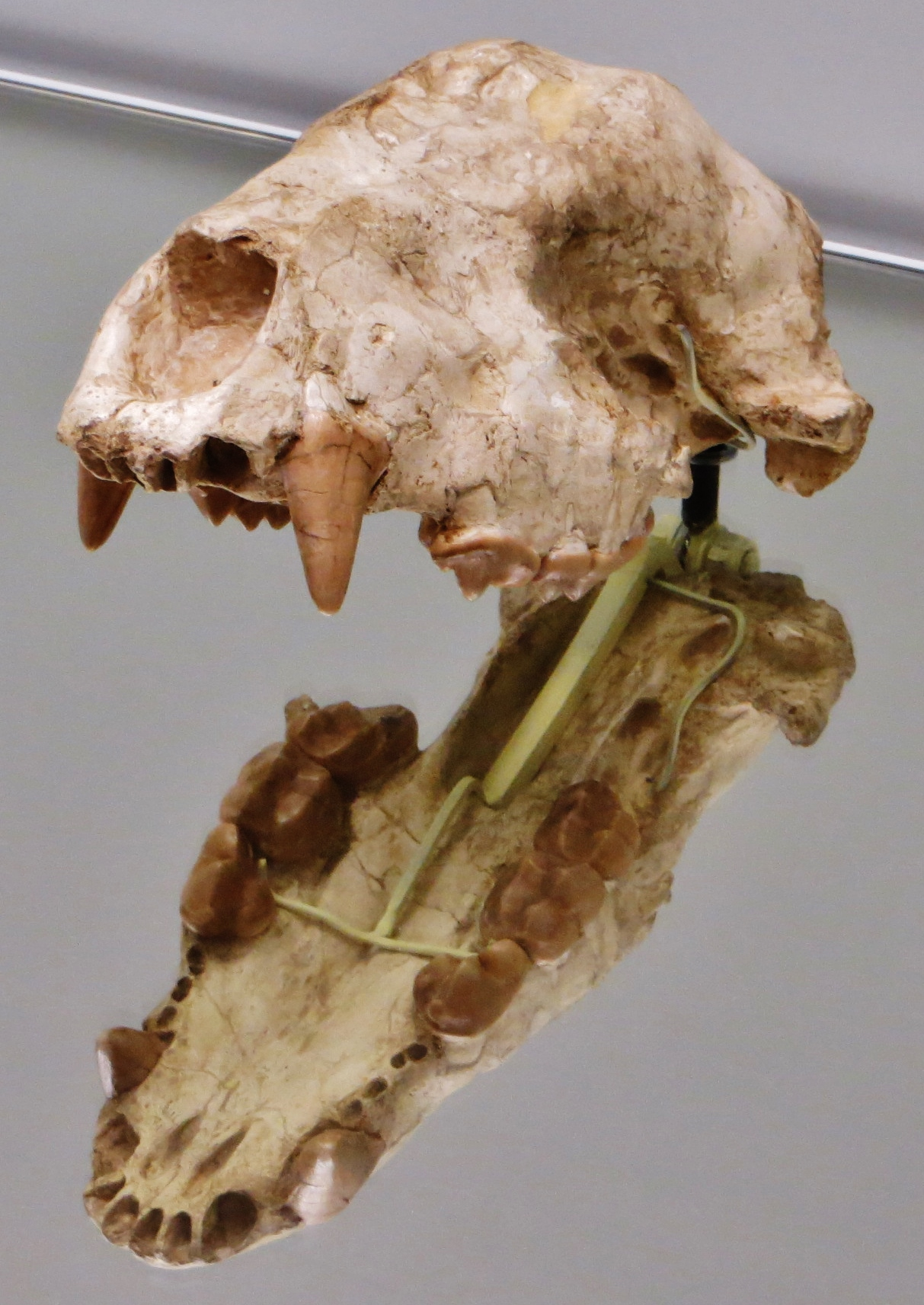
- Fossilized skull of the Miocene bear Indarctos
  †Indarctos
- †Inodrillia
  - †Inodrillia aepynota
- Ischnochiton
- Iselica
  - †Iselica myttonis
  - †Iselica psila – type locality for species
- Isognomon
  - †Isognomon alatus
  - †Isognomon radiatus – tentative report
- Isophyllia
  - †Isophyllia desotoensis – type locality for species
  - †Isophyllia sinuosa
- Isurus
  - †Isurus desori
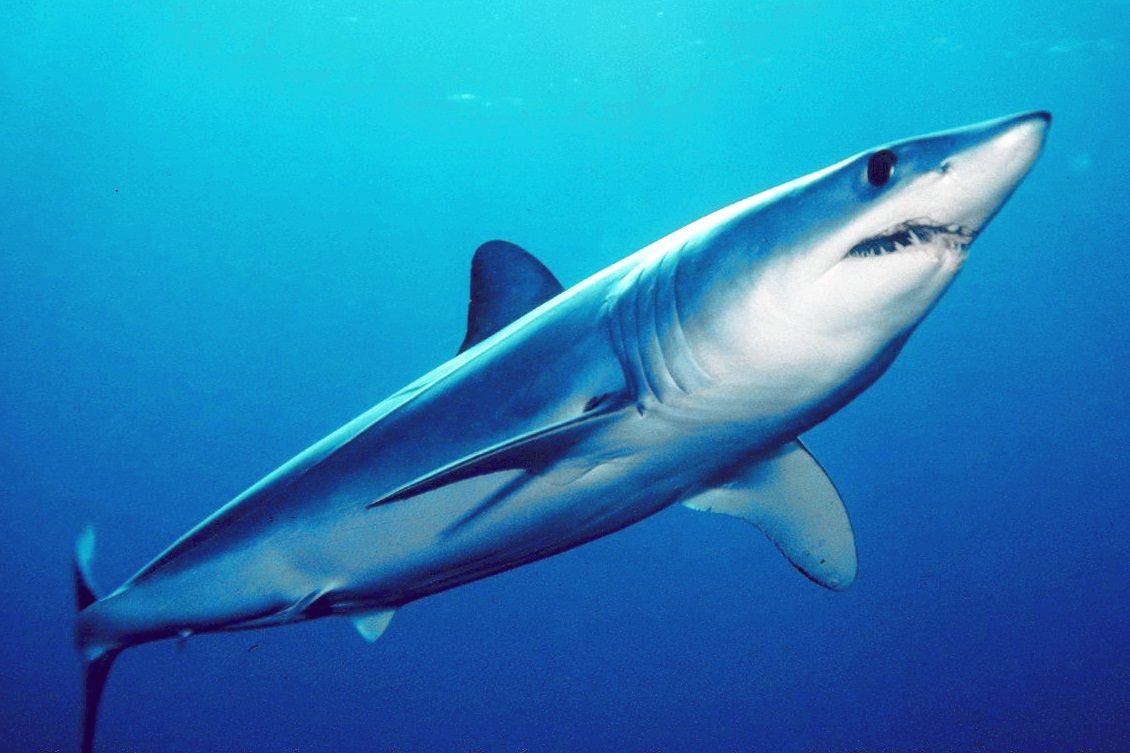
  - A living Isurus oxyrinchus, or shortfin mako shark
    †Isurus oxyrinchus
- Ithycythara
  - †Ithycythara defuniak – type locality for species
  - †Ithycythara emeryi
  - †Ithycythara lanceolata
  - †Ithycythara maera
  - †Ithycythara psila
  - †Ithycythara radinos – type locality for species
  - †Ithycythara tarri
- Ixobrychus
  - †Ixobrychus exilis

== J ==
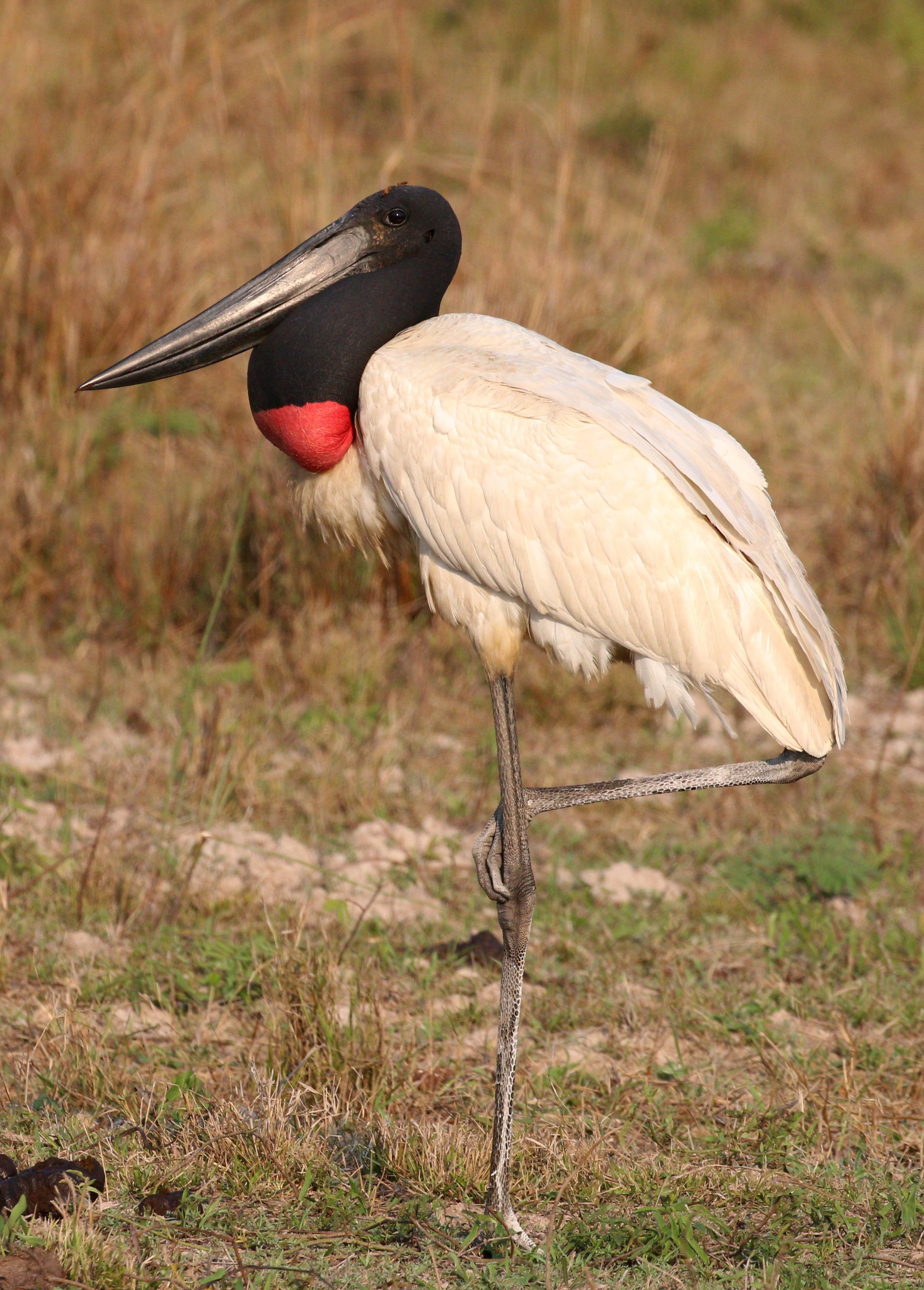
- A living Jabiru mycteria stork
  Jabiru
  - †Jabiru mycteria – type locality for species
- Jacana
  - †Jacana farrandi – type locality for species
  - †Jacana spinosa
- Japonactaeon
  - †Japonactaeon punctostriata
  - †Japonactaeon punctostriatus
- †Japsidiconus
  - †Japsidiconus wilsoni
- Jaspidella
  - †Jaspidella cofacorys – type locality for species
  - †Jaspidella colleta
  - †Jaspidella jaspidea – tentative report
- †Jenkinsia – or unidentified comparable form
- Jenneria
  - †Jenneria hepleri
  - †Jenneria loxahatchiensis
  - †Jenneria richardsi
  - †Jenneria violetae
- †Jimomys – or unidentified related form
- †Jordanella
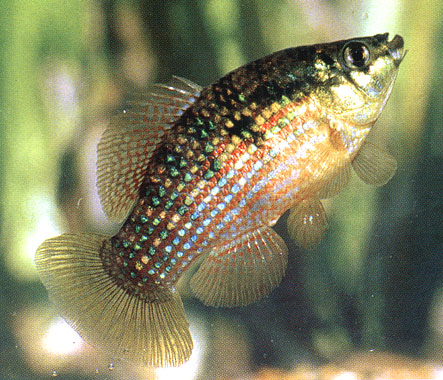
  - A living Jordanella floridae, or American flagfish
    †Jordanella floridae
- Julia
  - †Julia floridana
- Juliacorbula
  - †Juliacorbula scutata
- Junco
  - †Junco hyemalis

== K ==
- Kalolophus
  - †Kalolophus chipolanus
- †Karstala – type locality for genus
  - †Karstala silva – type locality for species
- †Kathpalmeria
  - †Kathpalmeria georgiana
- Kinosternon
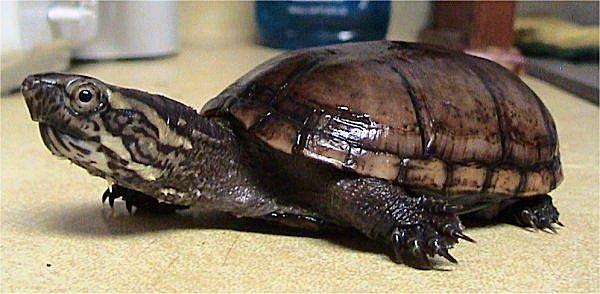
  - A living Kinosternon subrubrum, or eastern mud turtle
    †Kinosternon subrubrum
- †Kionaster
  - †Kionaster petersonae – type locality for species
- Knefastia
  - †Knefastia brooksvillensis
  - †Knefastia glypta – type locality for species
  - †Knefastia lindae
  - †Knefastia waltonia – type locality for species
- †Kogiopsis – type locality for genus
  - †Kogiopsis floridana – type locality for species
- †Koopmanycteris – type locality for genus
  - †Koopmanycteris palaeomormoops – type locality for species
- Kuphus
  - †Kuphus incrassatus
- Kurtziella
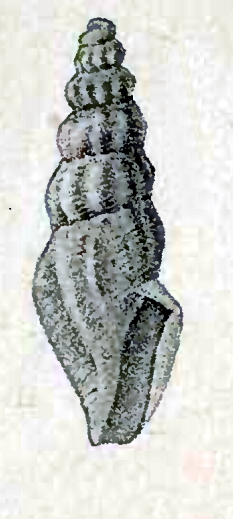
  - Illustration of the shell of a Kurtziella cerina sea snail
    †Kurtziella cerina
  - †Kurtziella daidalea – type locality for species
  - †Kurtziella limonitella
  - †Kurtziella limontella
  - †Kurtziella prionota – type locality for species
  - †Kurtziella ramondi
  - †Kurtziella serta
  - †Kurtziella stephanophora – type locality for species
  - †Kurtziella thektapleura – type locality for species
  - †Kurtziella websteri
- †Kyptoceras
  - †Kyptoceras amatorum

== L ==
- †Lachnolaimus
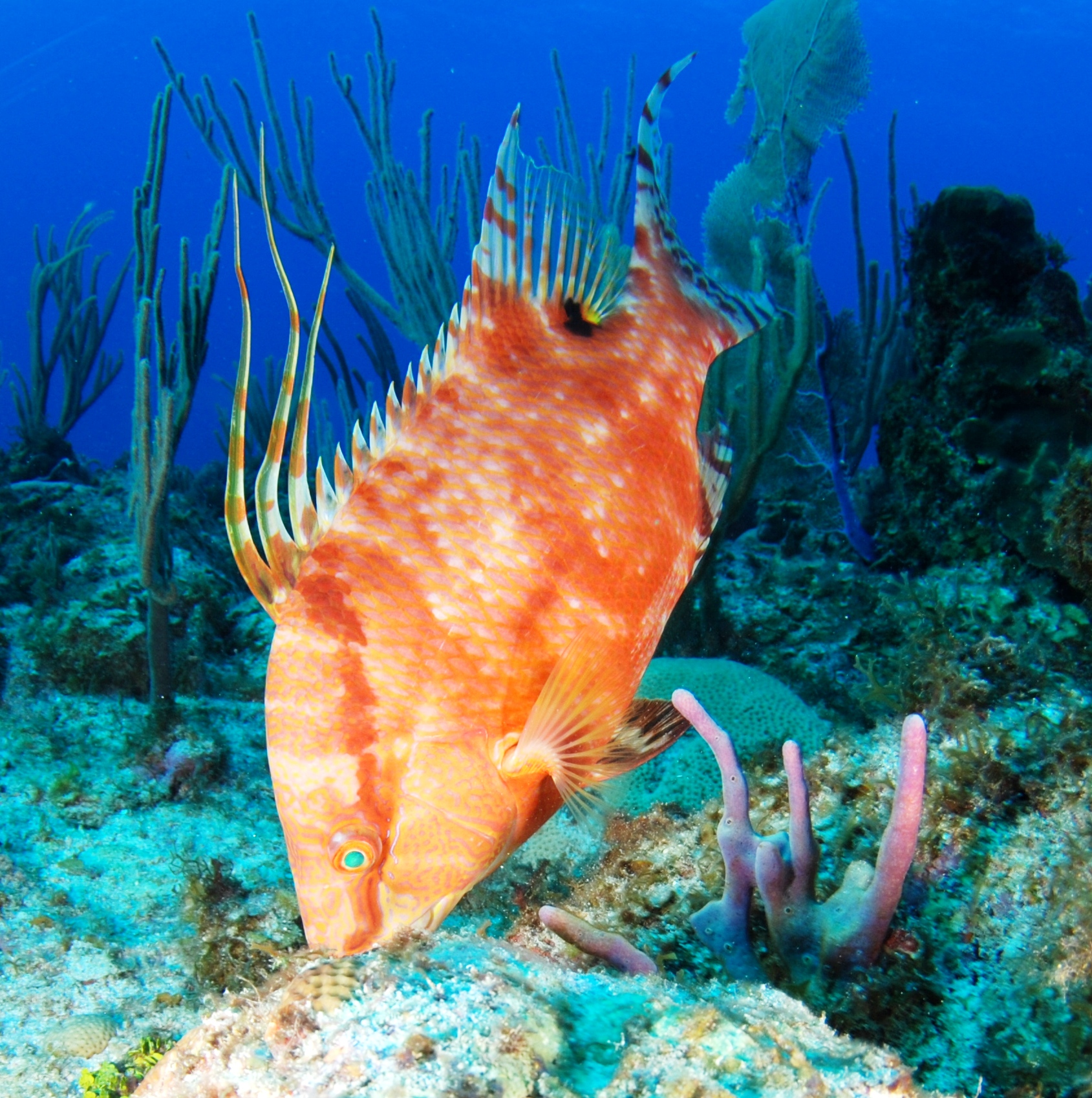
  - A living Lachnolaimus maximus, or hogfish
    †Lachnolaimus maximus
- Laciolina
  - †Laciolina magna
- †Lactophrys
- Laevapex
  - †Laevapex peninsulae
- †Laevella – type locality for genus
  - †Laevella floridana – type locality for species
- Laevicardium
  - †Laevicardium compressum
  - †Laevicardium mortoni
  - †Laevicardium serratum
- Laganum
  - †Laganum floridanum
  - †Laganum ocalanum
- Lagena
  - †Lagena hexagona
  - †Lagena laevis
  - †Lagena substriata
- †Lagodon
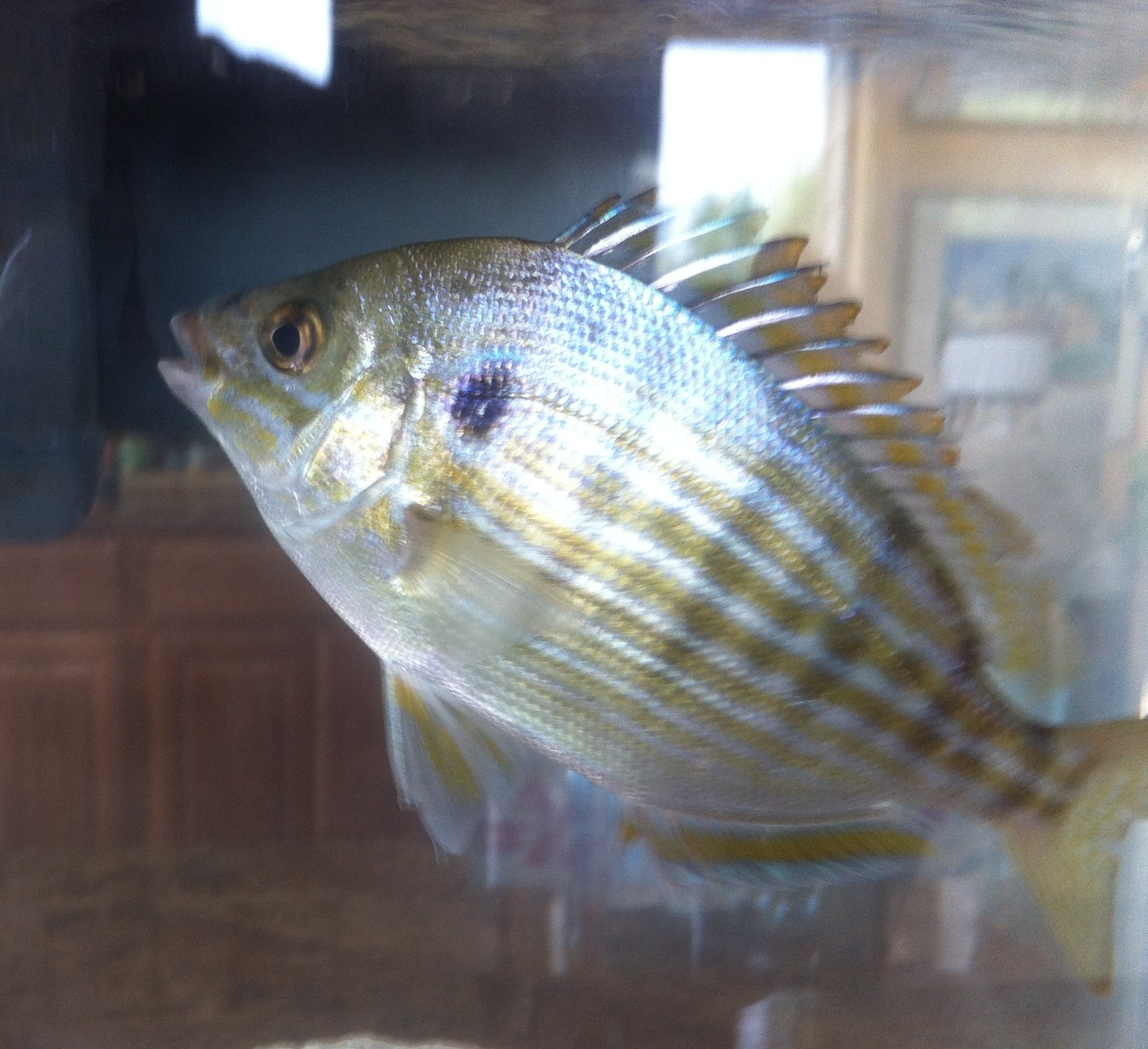
  - A living Lagodon rhomboides, or pinfish
    †Lagodon rhomboides
- †Laguna
  - †Laguna floridanum
- Lamarckina
  - †Lamarckina atlantica
- Lampropeltis
  - †Lampropeltis getulus
- Lamychaena
  - †Lamychaena hians
- Lanius
  - †Lanius ludovicianus
- †Lantanotherium
- †Lapparia
  - †Lapparia conradi – type locality for species
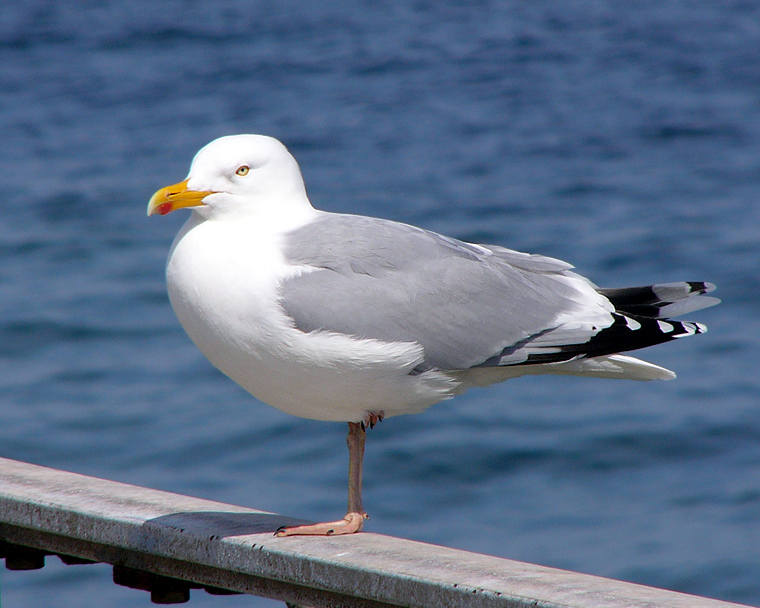
- A living Larus gull
  Larus
  - †Larus elmorei – type locality for species
  - †Larus elmori
  - †Larus lacus – type locality for species
  - †Larus perpetuus – type locality for species
- Lasiurus
  - †Lasiurus borealis
  - †Lasiurus intermedius
- †Latecphora
  - †Latecphora bradleyae
  - †Latecphora violetae
- Laterallus
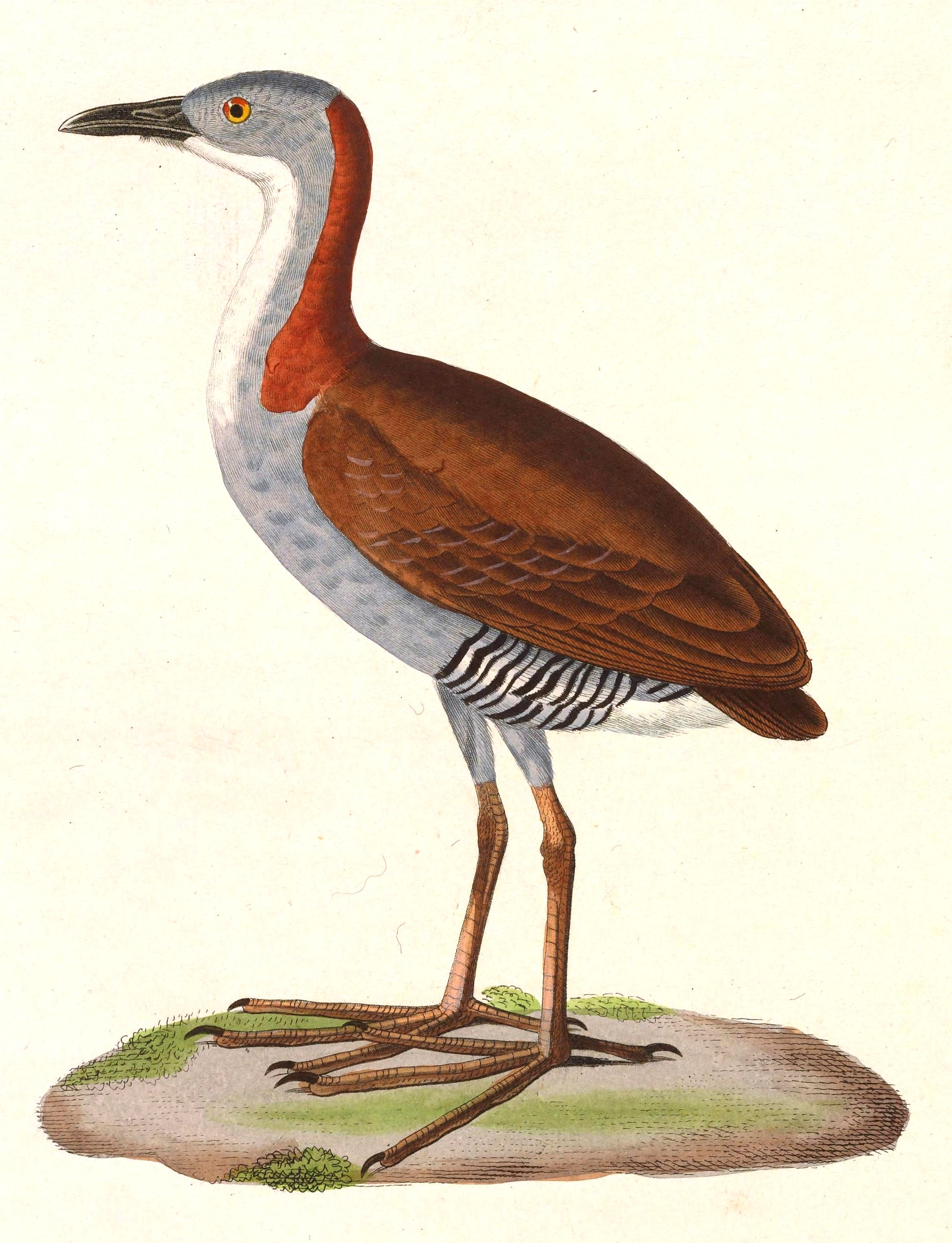
  - Illustration of a living Laterallus exilis, or grey-breasted crake
    †Laterallus exilis – or unidentified comparable form
  - †Laterallus guti
- Latirus
  - †Latirus angulata
  - †Latirus brevicaudatus
  - †Latirus callimorphus
  - †Latirus duerri
  - †Latirus floridanus
  - †Latirus hypsipettus
  - †Latirus jucundus
  - †Latirus maxwelli
  - †Latirus miamiensis
  - †Latirus multilineatus
  - †Latirus rugatus
  - †Latirus seminolensis
- †Leidymys
- Leiocephalus – tentative report
- Leiostomus
  - †Leiostomus xanthurus
- †Leitneria
  - †Leitneria floridana
- Lemintina
  - †Lemintina granifera
  - †Lemintina granifora
  - †Lemintina mcgintyi
- Leopardus
  - †Leopardus pardalis
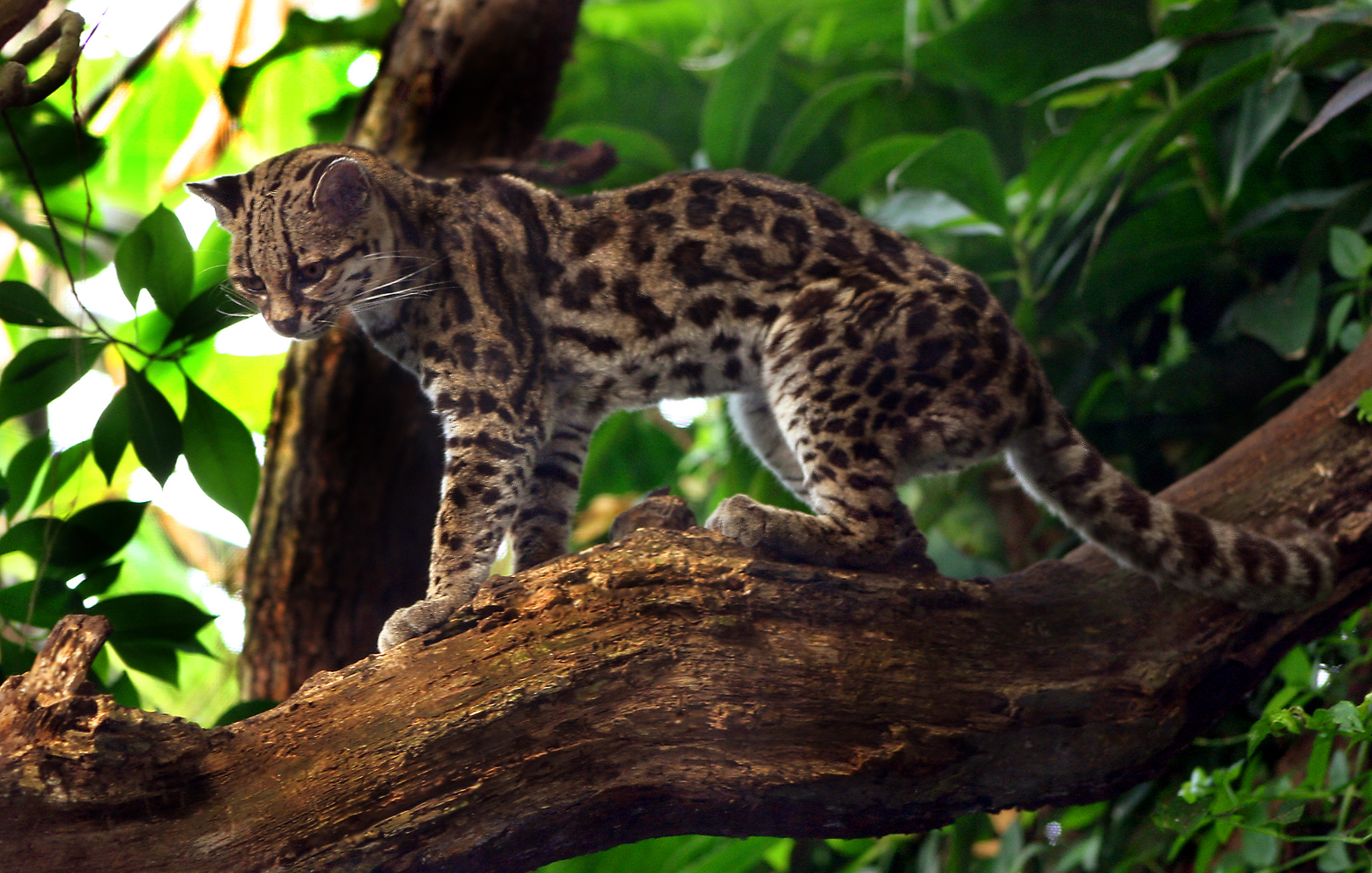
  - A living Leopardus wiedii, or margay
    †Leopardus wiedii
- †Lepicythara
  - †Lepicythara basilissa – type locality for species
  - †Lepicythara turrita
- Lepidochelys
- †Lepidocyclina
  - †Lepidocyclina ocalana
- Lepisosteus
  - †Lepisosteus platystomus
- Lepomis
  - †Lepomis gulosus – or unidentified comparable form
  - †Lepomis microlophus
- †Leptarctus
  - †Leptarctus ancipidens
  - †Leptarctus webbi – type locality for species
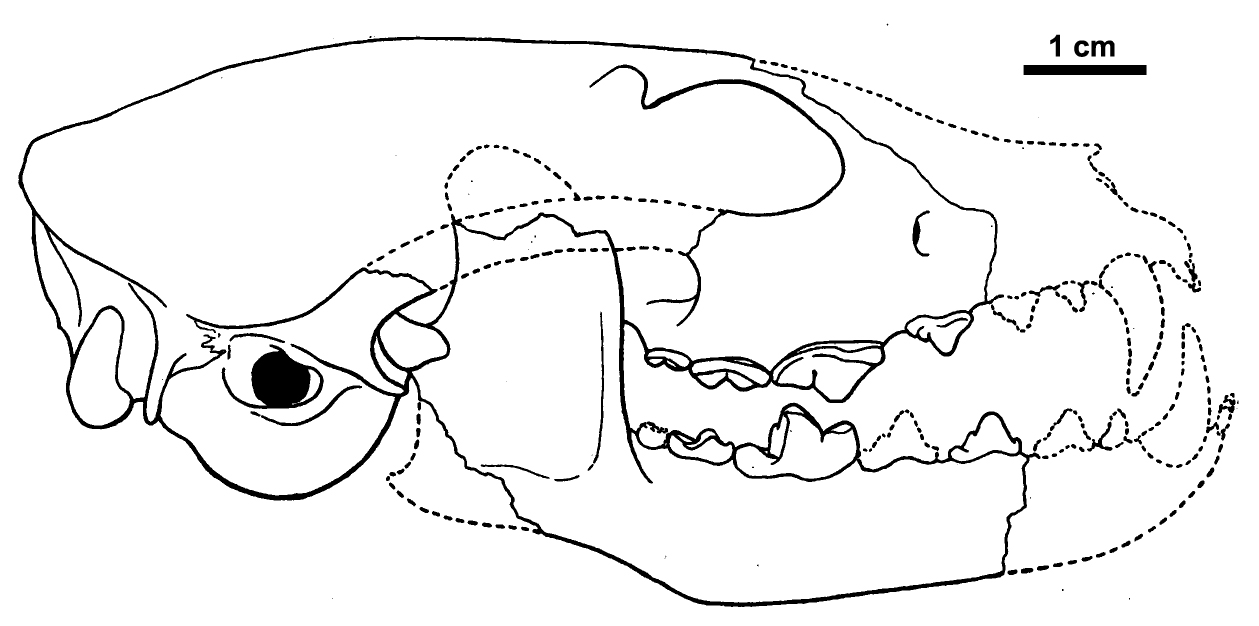
- Illustration of a fossilized skull of the Oligocene-Miocene dog Leptocyon
  †Leptocyon – tentative report
- †Leptomactra
  - †Leptomactra delumbis
  - †Leptomactra valhosierr – type locality for species
- Leptopecten
  - †Leptopecten irremotis
  - †Leptopecten leonensis
- Leptoseris
  - †Leptoseris cucullata
- Lepus
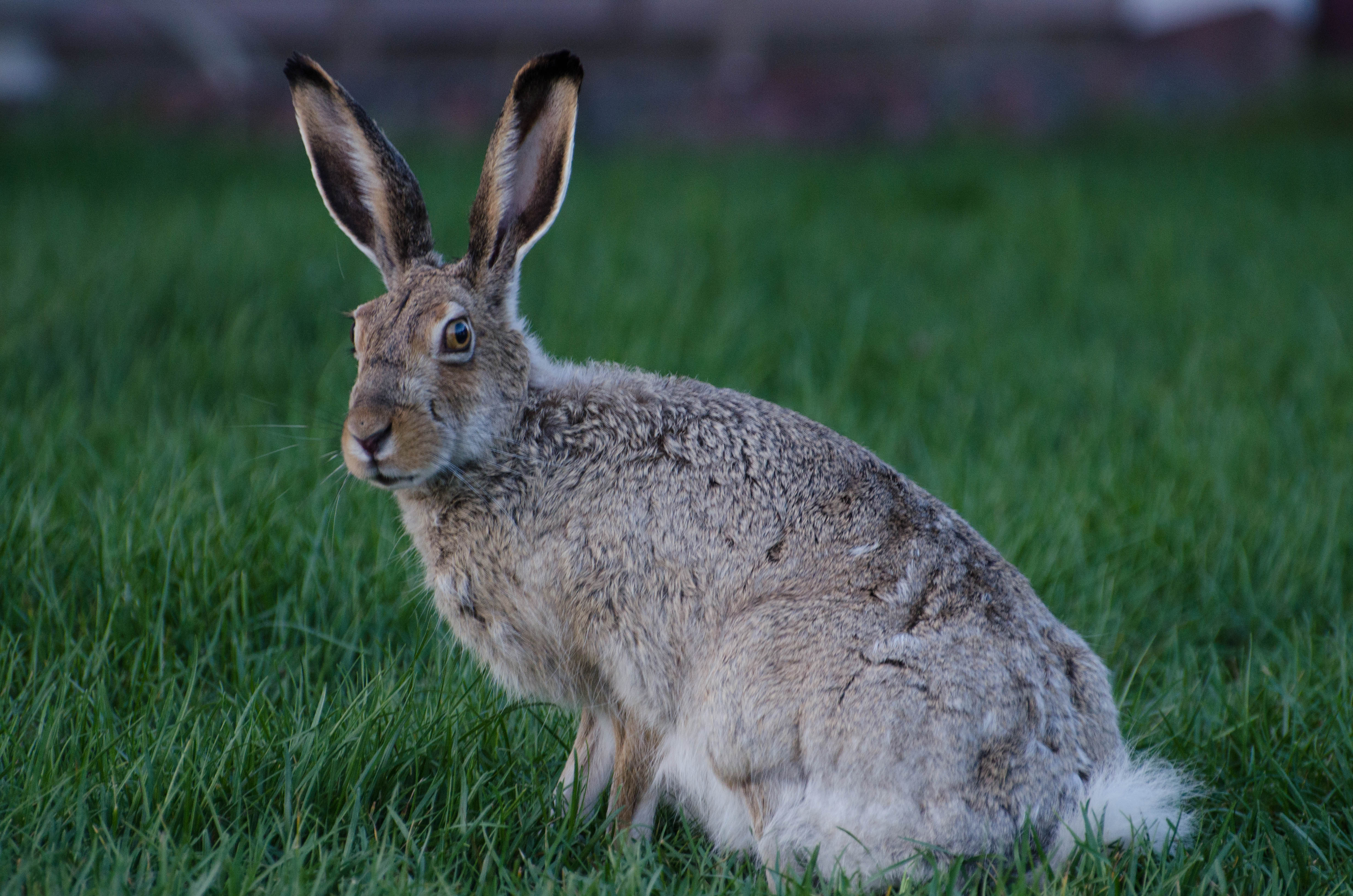
  - A living Lepus townsendii, or white-tailed jackrabbit
    †Lepus townsendii – or unidentified comparable form
- †Leucophoyx
  - †Leucophoyx thula
- Lichenopora
- Lima
  - †Lima caribaea
  - †Lima caribbaea
  - †Lima halensis
  - †Lima vicksburgiana
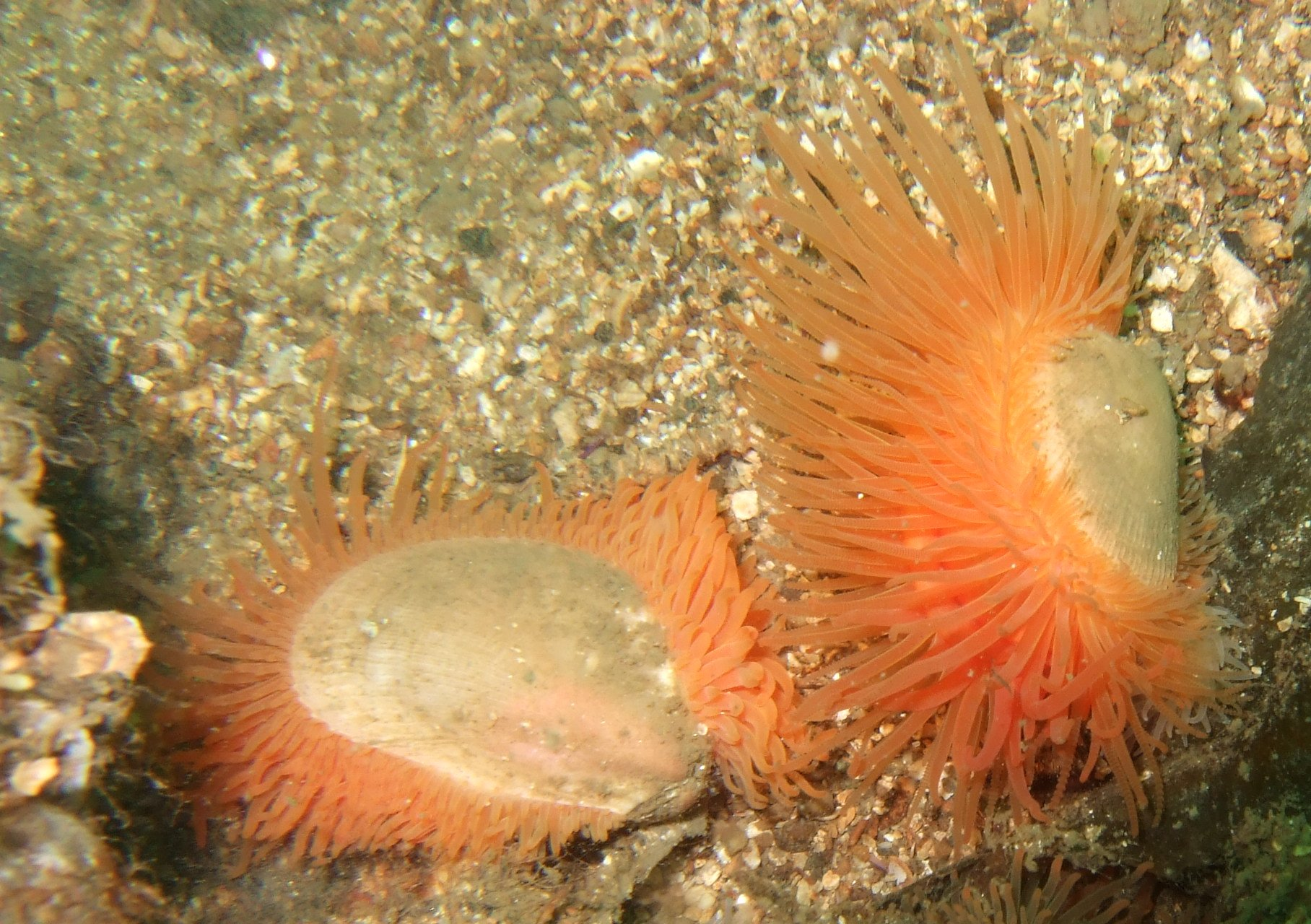
- Living Limaria, or file shells
  Limaria
  - †Limaria carolinensis
  - †Limaria chipolana
  - †Limaria pellucida
- Limatula
  - †Limatula subauriculata
- Limea
  - †Limea bronniana
- Limnodromus
  - †Limnodromus scolopaceus
- †Limnoecus
- †Limosa
- Linatella
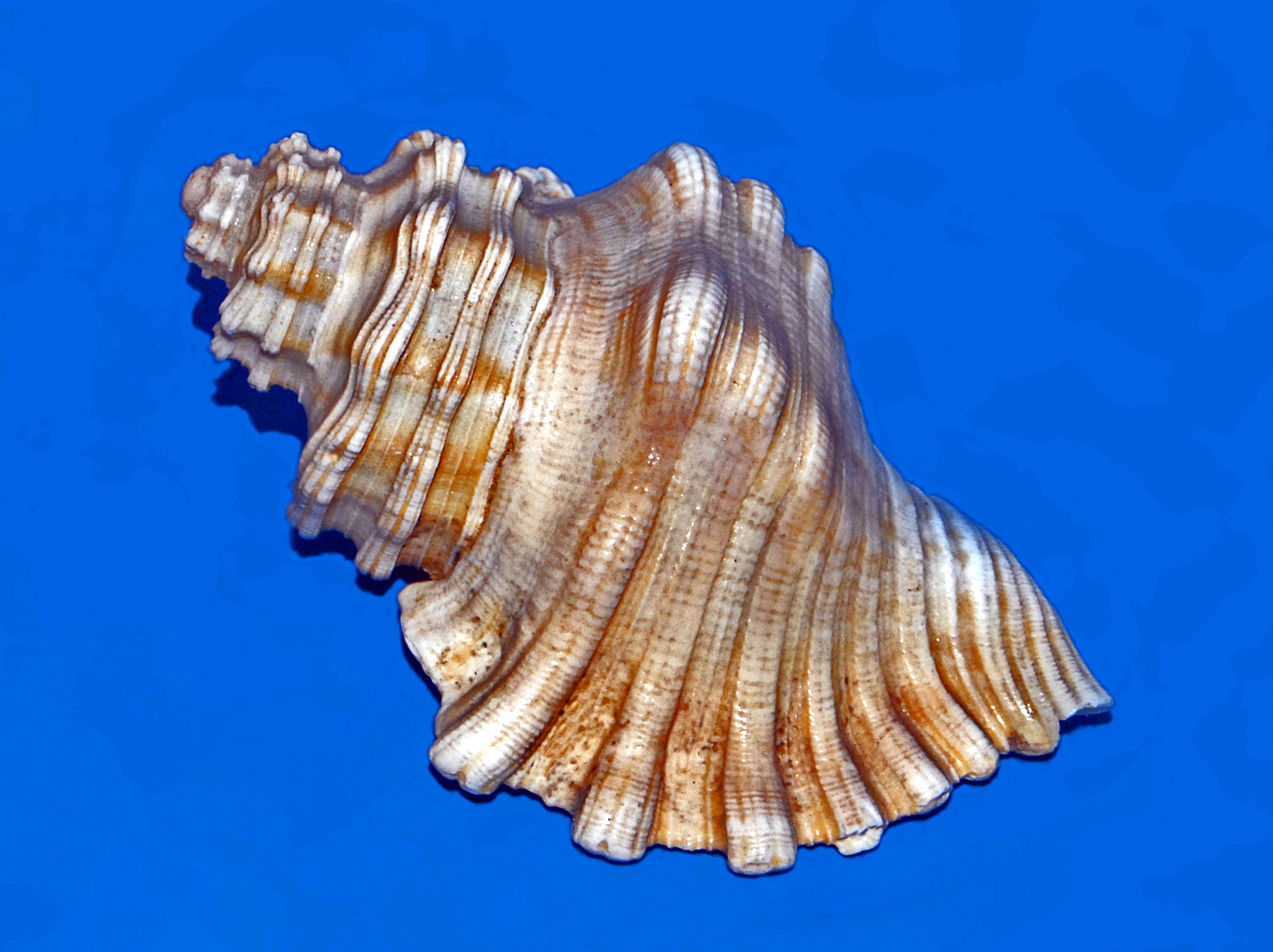
  - Shell of a Linatella triton sea snail
    †Linatella caudata
- Lindapecten
  - †Lindapecten acanikos – type locality for species
  - †Lindapecten chipolanus
  - †Lindapecten harrisi
  - †Lindapecten muscosus
- †Lindoliva
  - †Lindoliva diegelae
- Linga
  - †Linga densatus
  - †Linga gelnni
  - †Linga waccamawensis
- †Liochlamys
  - †Liochlamys bulbosa
  - †Liochlamys griffini
- Lioglyphostoma
  - †Lioglyphostoma rusum – type locality for species
  - †Lioglyphostoma solia
  - †Lioglyphostoma tyro – type locality for species
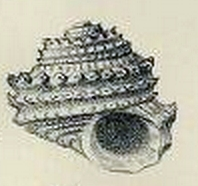
- Illustration of the shell of a Liotia sea snail
  Liotia
  - †Liotia agenea
  - †Liotia coronata
  - †Liotia solariella
- †Liquidambar
- †Lirodiscus
  - †Lirodiscus jacksonensis
- Lirophora
  - †Lirophora burnsii
  - †Lirophora ceramota – type locality for species
  - †Lirophora crossata
  - †Lirophora crossota
  - †Lirophora cumaina
  - †Lirophora cymaina
  - †Lirophora funiakensis – type locality for species
  - †Lirophora glyptocyma
  - †Lirophora latilirata
  - †Lirophora sellardsi – type locality for species
  - †Lirophora trimeris – type locality for species
  - †Lirophora ulocyma
  - †Lirophora xesta
- Lithophaga
  - †Lithophaga antillarum
  - †Lithophaga aristata – tentative report
  - †Lithophaga bisulcata
  - †Lithophaga dalli
  - †Lithophaga nigra
  - †Lithophaga oryzoides – type locality for species
- Lithophyllum
  - †Lithophyllum compactum
  - †Lithophyllum zonatum
- †Lithophysema
- Lithopoma
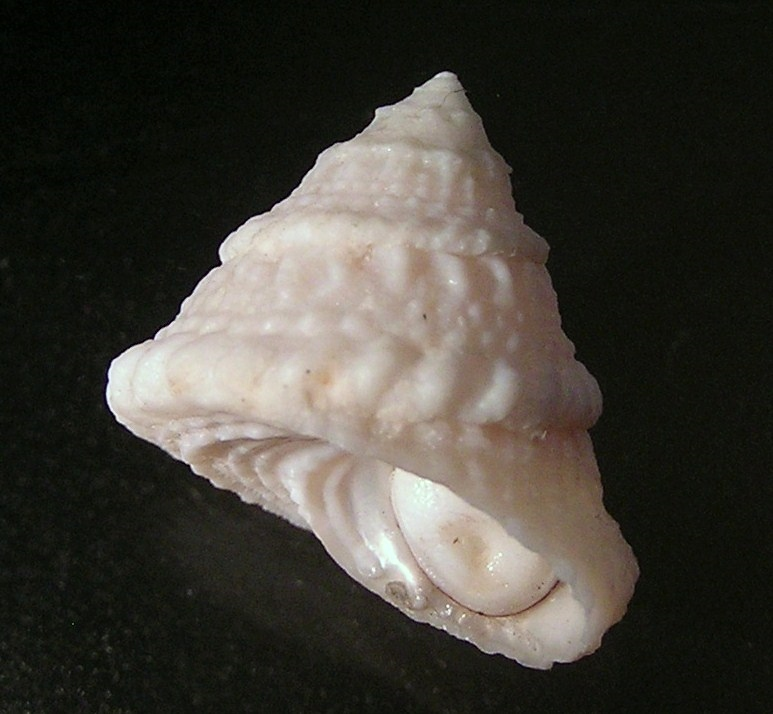
  - Shell of a Lithopoma americanum turban sea snail
    †Lithopoma americanum
  - †Lithopoma lindae
  - †Lithopoma precursor
  - †Lithopoma scolopax
  - †Lithopoma tectariaeformis
- Lithothamnion
- Litiopa
  - †Litiopa palaeosargassina
- Littoraria
  - †Littoraria angulifera
  - †Littoraria caloosahatcheensis
  - †Littoraria irrorata
  - †Littoraria lindae
  - †Littoraria seminole
  - †Littoraria sheaferi
- Littorina
  - †Littorina sheaferi
- †Lituonella
- Lobatus
  - †Lobatus costatus
  - †Lobatus gigas
  - †Lobatus raninus
  - †Lobatus williamsi
- Longchaeus
  - †Longchaeus suturalis
- Lontra
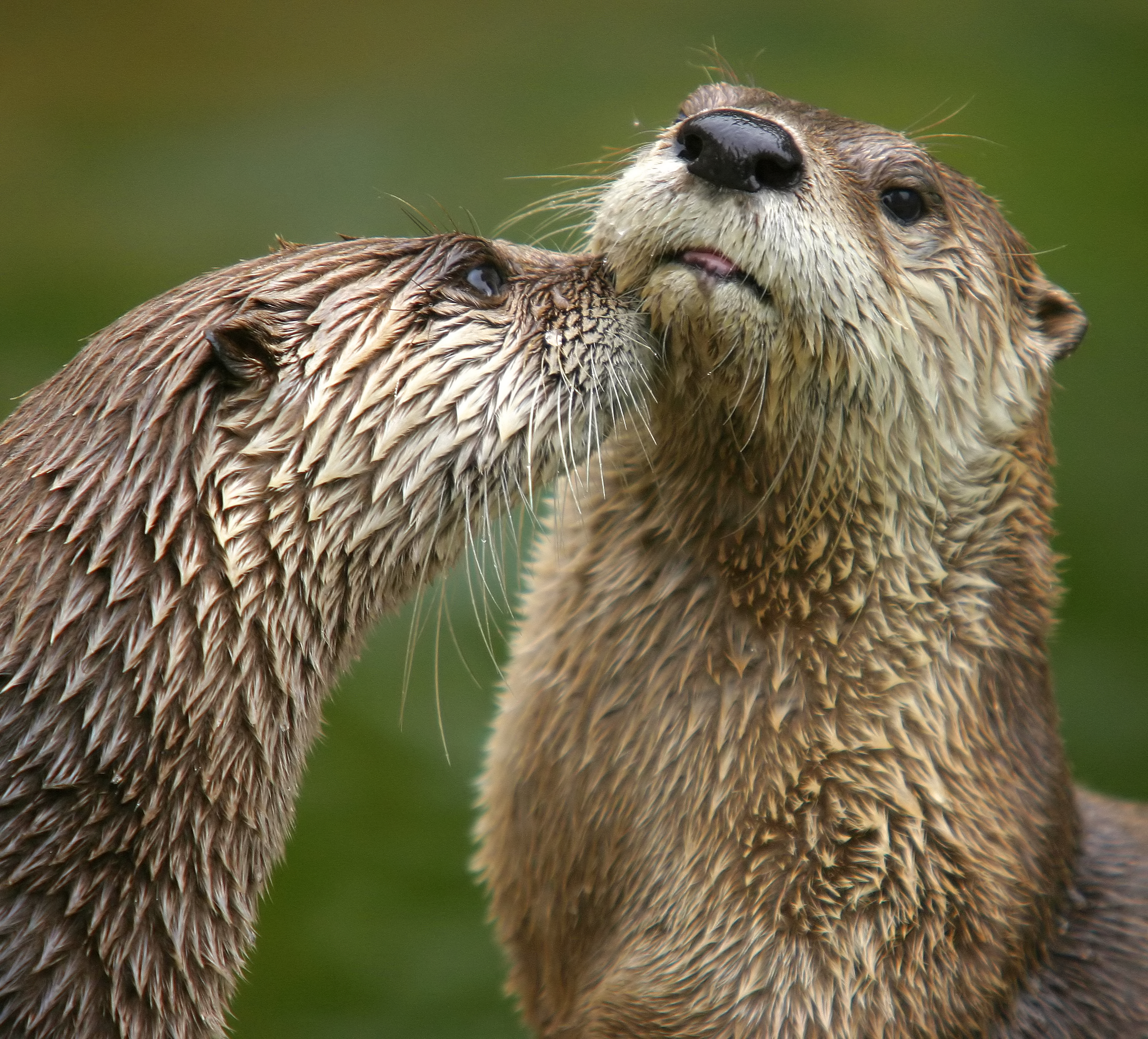
  - Pair of living Lontra canadensis, or North American river otter
    †Lontra canadensis
- Lophelia
  - †Lophelia brachycephala – or unidentified comparable form
  - †Lophelia gracilis – or unidentified comparable form
  - †Lophelia prolifera
- †Lophocetus – or unidentified related form
- Lophodytes
  - †Lophodytes cucullatus
- †Lophoranina
  - †Lophoranina georgiana
- Lottia
  - †Lottia actina
- Lovenia
  - †Lovenia clarki
- Loxacypraea
  - †Loxacypraea apalachicolae – type locality for species
  - †Loxacypraea chilona – type locality for species
  - †Loxacypraea emilyae – type locality for species
- Loxoconcha
  - †Loxoconcha doryandae
  - †Loxoconcha reticularis
- Lucapina
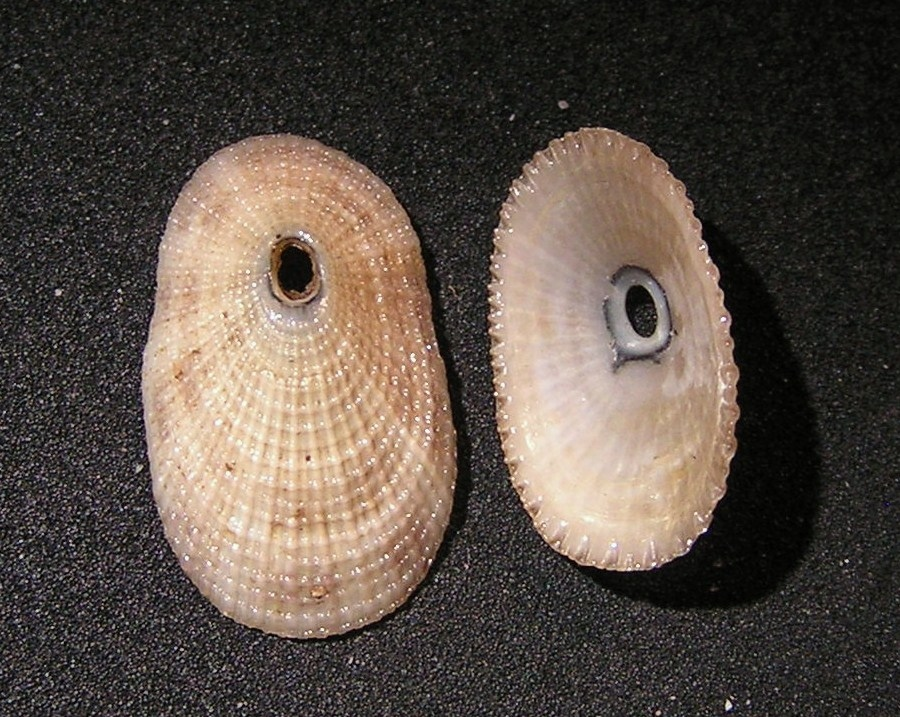
  - Shells of Lucapina sowerbii, or Sowerby's fleshy limpet
    †Lucapina sowerbii
  - †Lucapina suffusa
  - †Lucapina talanteia
- Lucapinella
  - †Lucapinella limatula
- Lucina
  - †Lucina corpulenta
  - †Lucina pensylvanica
- Lucinisca
  - †Lucinisca calhounensis
  - †Lucinisca cribarius
  - †Lucinisca cribrarius
  - †Lucinisca nassula
  - †Lucinisca plesiolophus
  - †Lucinisca silicatus
- Lucinoma
  - †Lucinoma contractus
  - †Lucinoma crenulata
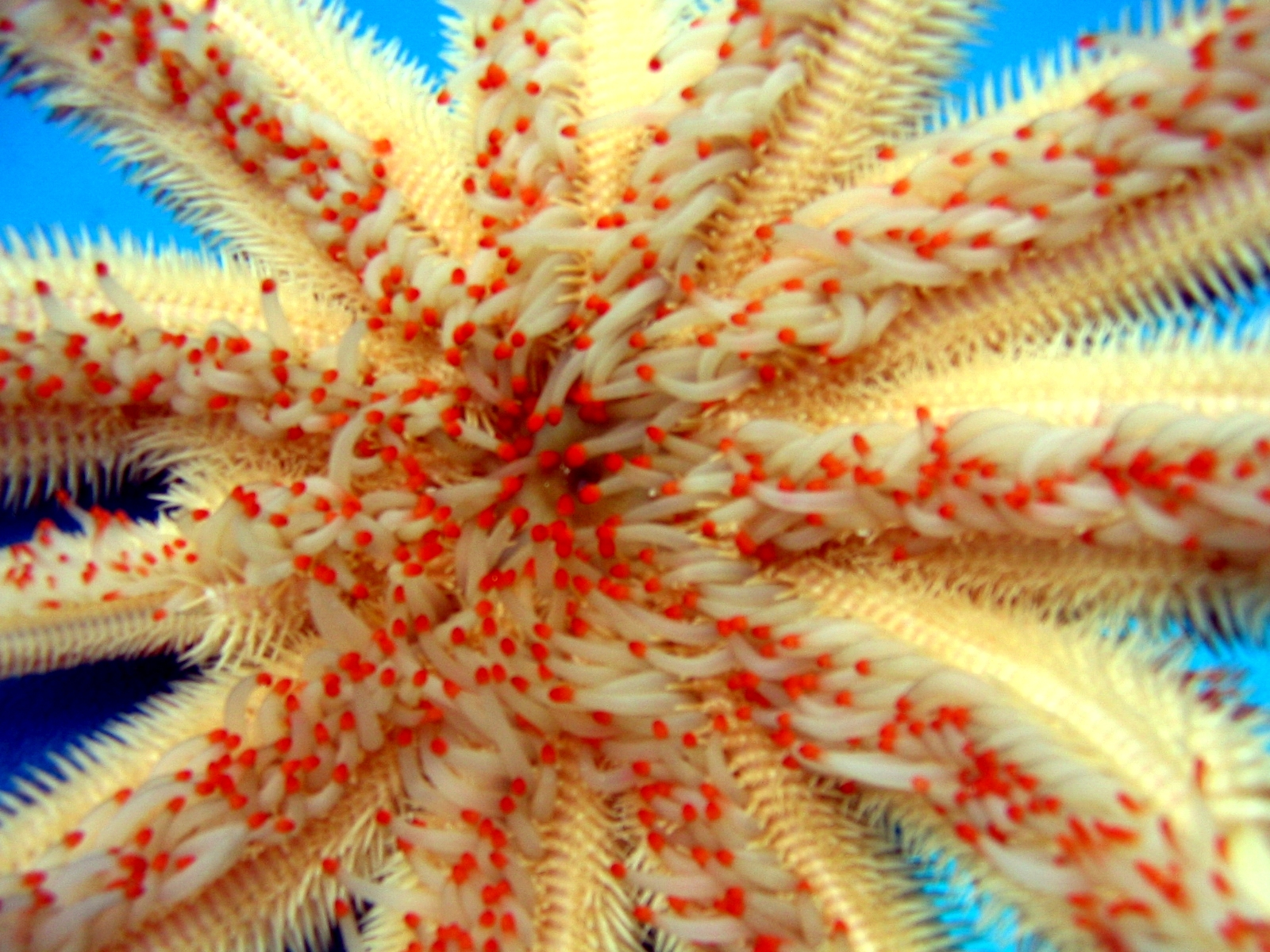
- Underside of a Luidia sea star
  Luidia
- Lunulites
  - †Lunulites distans
- Luria
  - †Luria campbelliana
  - †Luria dominicensis
  - †Luria mariaelisabethae – type locality for species
  - †Luria voleki
- †Lutjanus
- Lynx
  - †Lynx rufus
- Lyria
  - †Lyria citrusensis – type locality for species
  - †Lyria heilprini
  - †Lyria mississippiensis – tentative report
  - †Lyria musicina
  - †Lyria pycnopleura – type locality for species
- †Lyropecten
  - †Lyropecten burnetti
  - †Lyropecten jeffersonensis
  - †Lyropecten marionensis
  - †Lyropecten nicholsi
  - †Lyropecten tamiamiensis – type locality for species
- Lytechinus
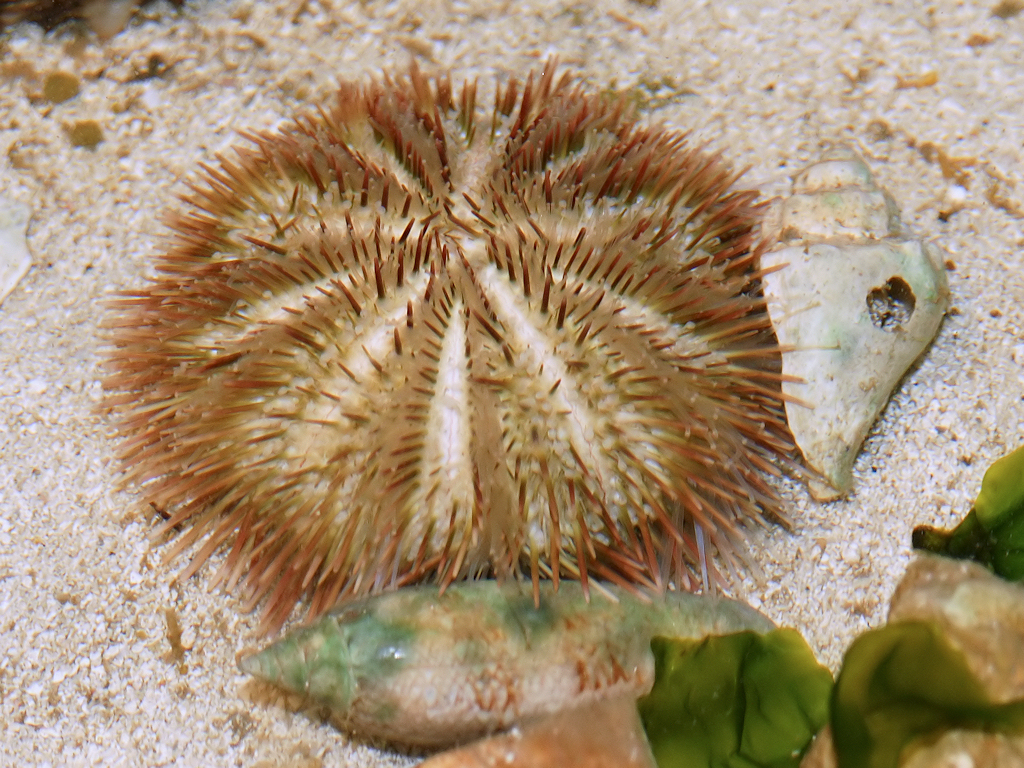
  - A living Lytechinus variegatus, also known as the green or variegated sea urchin
    †Lytechinus variegatus

== M ==
- †Machaeromeryx
  - †Machaeromeryx gilchristensis – type locality for species
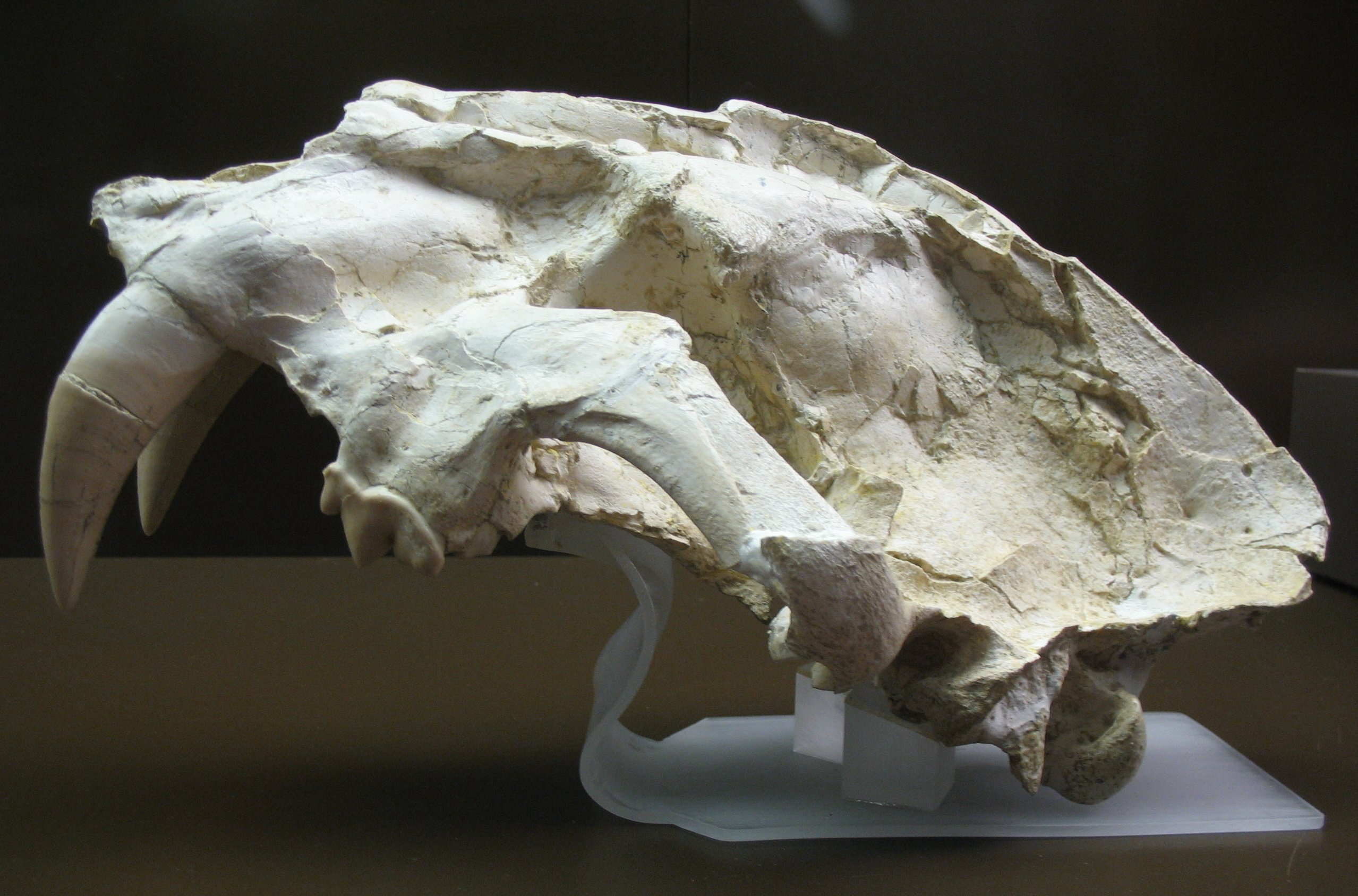
- Fossilized cranium of the Miocene-Pleistocene saber-toothed cat Machairodus
  †Machairodus
- Macoma
  - †Macoma brevifrons
  - †Macoma constricta
  - †Macoma irma
  - †Macoma paralenis – type locality for species
  - †Macoma pseudomera – or unidentified comparable form
  - †Macoma tenta
  - †Macoma virginiana
  - †Macoma virginicana
- Macrocallista
  - †Macrocallista acuminata
  - †Macrocallista annexa
  - †Macrocallista maculata
  - †Macrocallista nimbosa
  - †Macrocallista reposta
  - †Macrocallista waltonensis
- Macrochelys
  - †Macrochelys auffenbergi – type locality for species
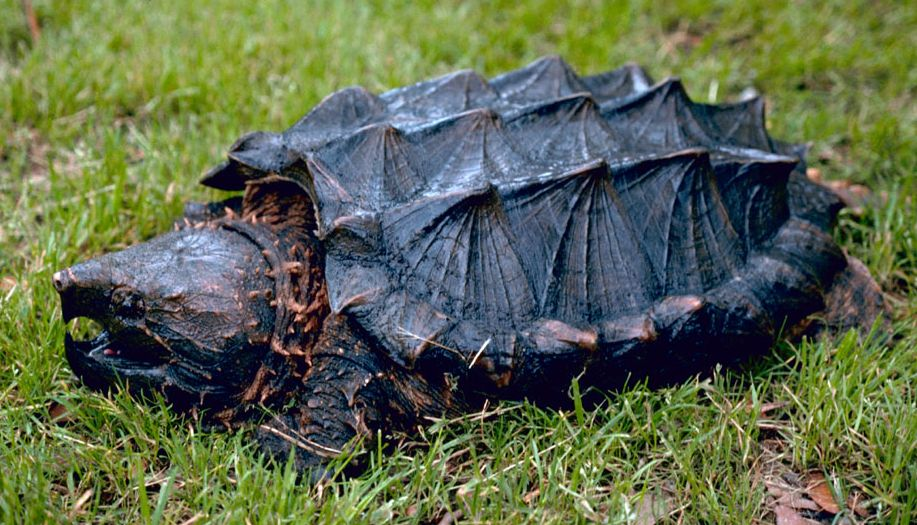
  - A living Macrochelys temminckii, or alligator snapping turtle
    †Macrochelys temminckii
- Macrocypraea
  - †Macrocypraea cervus
  - †Macrocypraea joanneae
  - †Macrocypraea spengleri
- Macropneustes
- Mactra
  - †Mactra chipolana
- †Mactrocallista
- Mactrotoma
  - †Mactrotoma cymata
  - †Mactrotoma fragilis
  - †Mactrotoma fragilus
  - †Mactrotoma undula
- Madracis
  - †Madracis decactis
  - †Madracis decaseptata – type locality for species
- Madrepora
  - †Madrepora oculata
- Magilus
  - †Magilus streami
- Magnolia
  - †Magnolia virginiana
- Malaclemys
  - †Malaclemys terrapin
- Malea
  - †Malea springi
- †Mammacyon
  - †Mammacyon obtusidens – or unidentified comparable form
- †Mammut
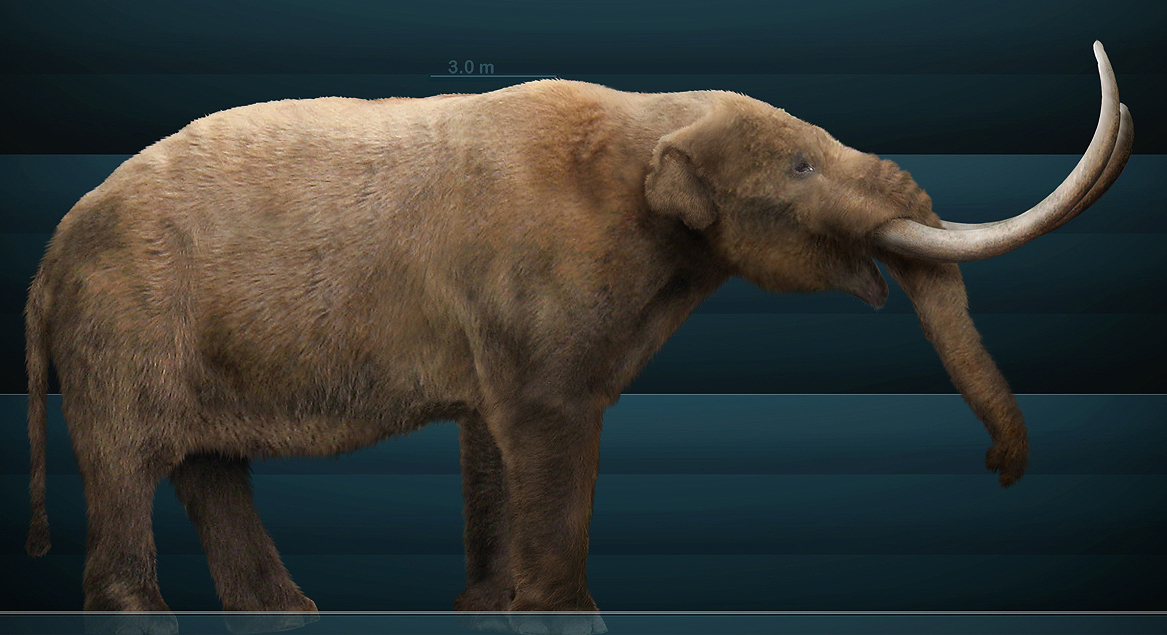
  - Restoration of a Mammut americanum, or American mastodon
    †Mammut americanum
  - †Mammut matthewi
- †Mammuthus
  - †Mammuthus columbi – type locality for species
  - †Mammuthus hayi
- Manicina
  - †Manicina areolata
  - †Manicina pliocenica
  - †Manicina puntagordensis
- Maoricrypta
  - †Maoricrypta costata
- Marevalvata
  - †Marevalvata tricarinata
- Margaretta
  - †Margaretta congesta – type locality for species
  - †Margaretta fallax
  - †Margaretta nodifera
  - †Margaretta vicksburgica
- †Margaritaria
  - †Margaritaria abrupta
- Margarites
  - †Margarites tampaensis
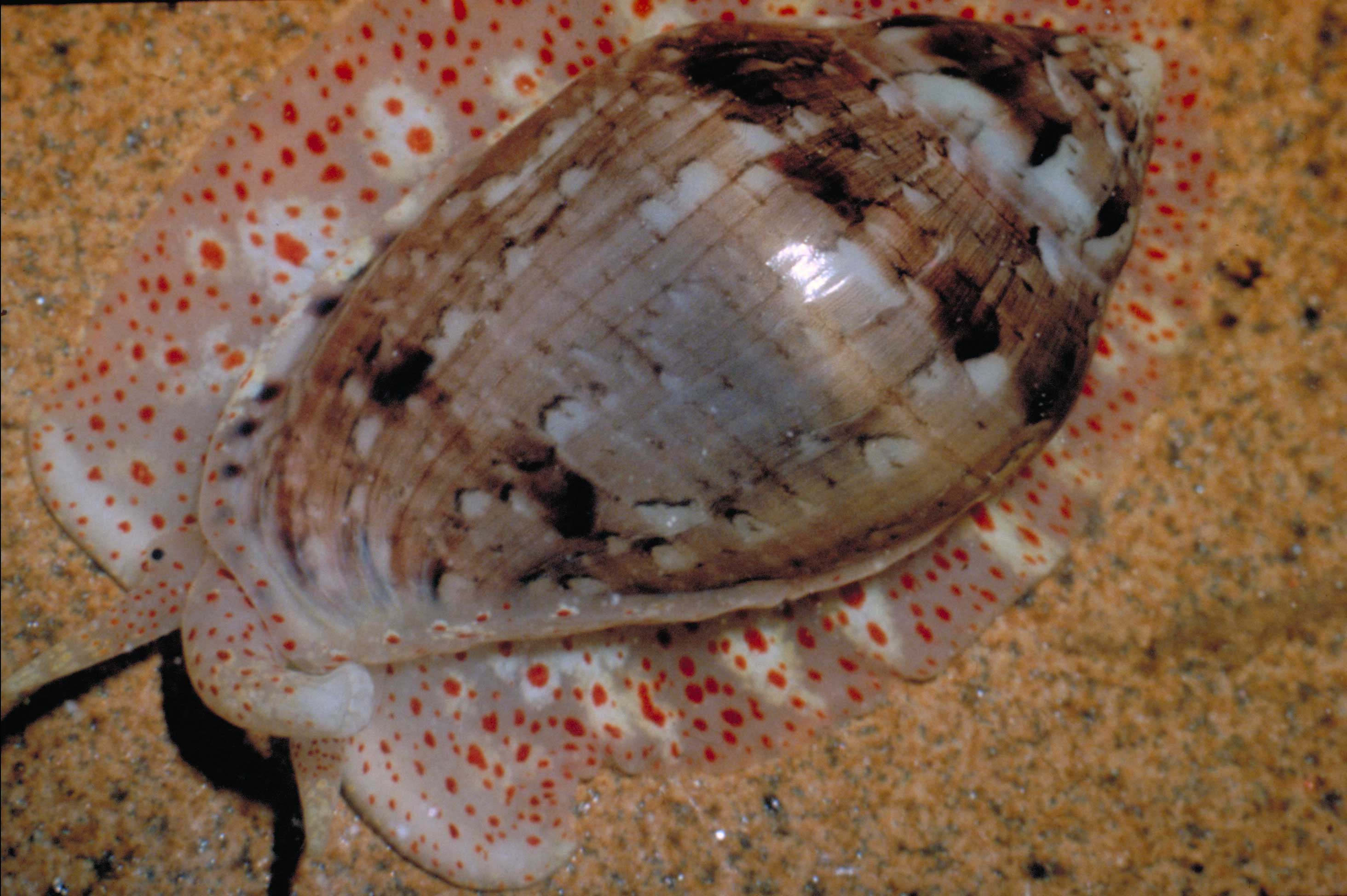
- A living Marginella margin sea snail
  Marginella
  - †Marginella amiantula
  - †Marginella ballista
  - †Marginella bella
  - †Marginella bellula
  - †Marginella caloosana
  - †Marginella clenchi – or unidentified comparable form
  - †Marginella contracta – or unidentified related form
  - †Marginella denticulata
  - †Marginella faunula
  - †Marginella gravida – or unidentified comparable form
  - †Marginella gregaria
  - †Marginella hartleyanum
  - †Marginella inepta
  - †Marginella infecta
  - †Marginella mansfieldi
  - †Marginella minuta
  - †Marginella pardalis
  - †Marginella posti
- Marshallora
  - †Marshallora nigrocincta
- Marsupina
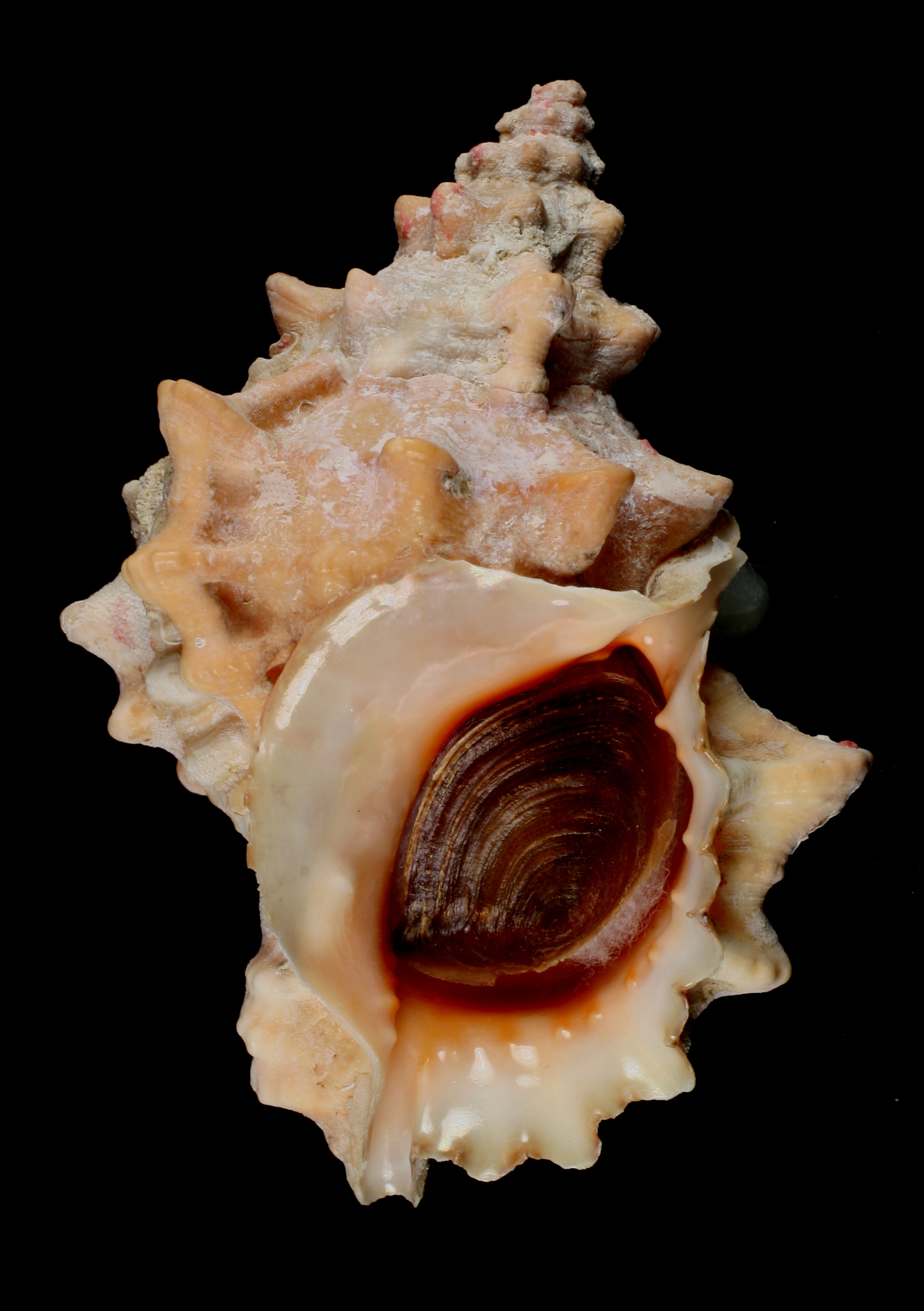
  - Shell of a Marsupina bufo, or chestnut frog shell sea snail
    †Marsupina bufo
- Martesia
  - †Martesia striata
- †Marvacrassatella
  - †Marvacrassatella meridianalis
  - †Marvacrassatella meridionalis
- Massyla
  - †Massyla distinguenda
  - †Massyla propevenusta
  - †Massyla runchaena – type locality for species
  - †Massyla shirleyae
  - †Massyla venusta
- Masticophis
  - †Masticophis flagellum
- †Mazzalina – report made of unidentified related form or using admittedly obsolete nomenclature
  - †Mazzalina costata
- †Mclelannia
  - †Mclelannia aenigma
- Meandrina
  - †Meandrina alveolus
  - †Meandrina barretti
  - †Meandrina costatus
  - †Meandrina meandrites
  - †Meandrina meandrities
  - †Meandrina variabilis
- Megabalanus
  - †Megabalanus tintinnabulum
- Megacardita
  - †Megacardita hesperide
- Megaceryle
  - †Megaceryle alcyon
- †Megahippus
- †Megalagus
  - †Megalagus abaconis – type locality for species
- †Megalictis
  - †Megalictis frazieri
- †Megalonx
  - †Megalonx wheatleyi – or unidentified comparable form
- †Megalonyx
  - †Megalonyx jeffersonii
  - †Megalonyx leptostomus
  - †Megalonyx wheatleyi
- Megalops
  - †Megalops atlantica – or unidentified comparable form
  - †Megalops atlanticus
- †Megantereon
  - †Megantereon hesperus
- Megaptera
- Meioceras
  - †Meioceras nitidum
- Melampus
  - †Melampus bidentatus
  - †Melampus coffea
  - †Melampus monile
- Melanella
  - †Melanella bartschi
  - †Melanella calkinsi
  - †Melanella conoidea
  - †Melanella jamaicensis
  - †Melanella locklini
  - †Melanella magnoliana
- Melanerpes
  - †Melanerpes carolinus
  - †Melanerpes erythrocephalus
- Meleagris
  - †Meleagris anza
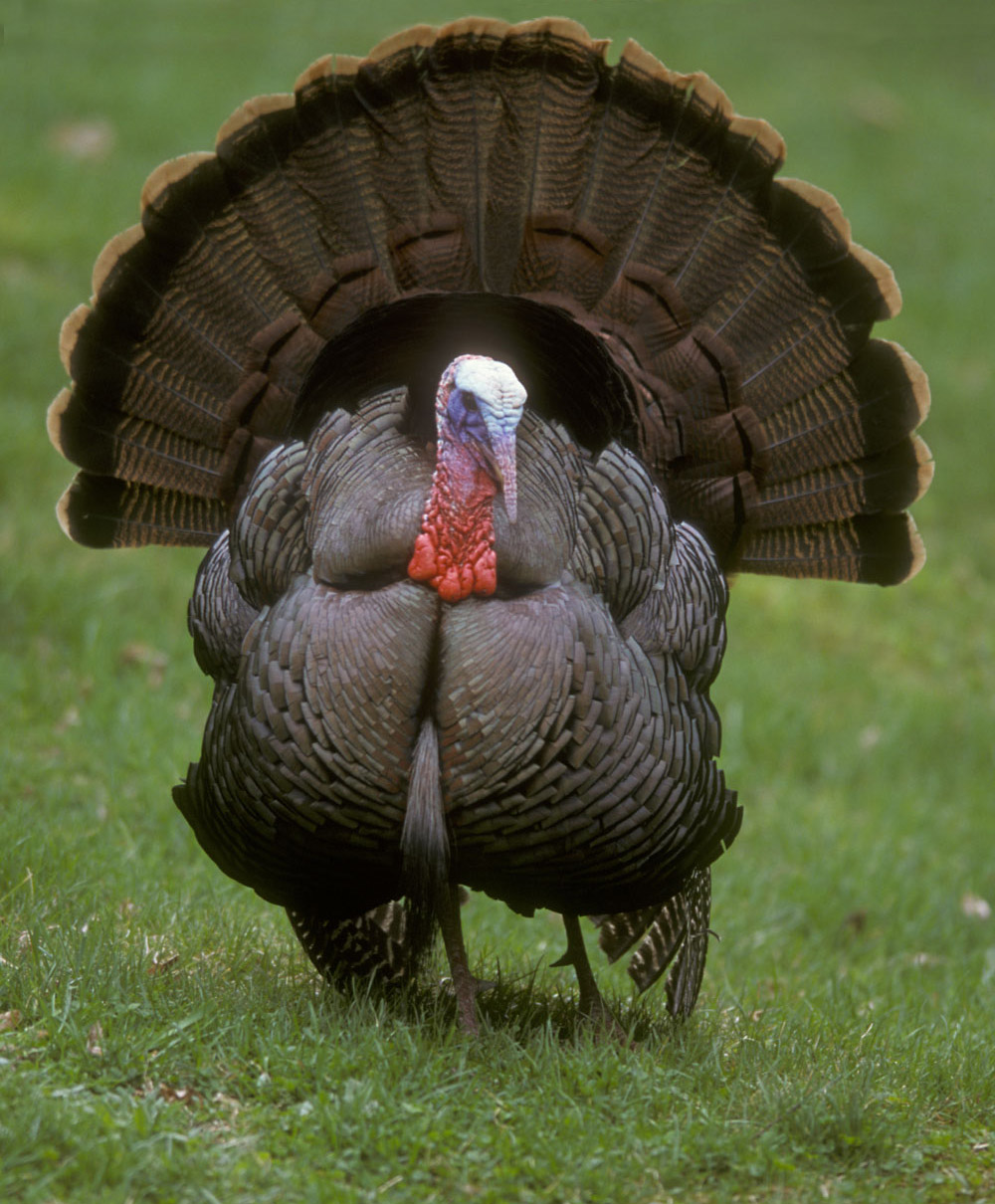
  - A wild male Meleagris gallopavo, or turkey, displaying his facial coloration and tail feathers to attract a female
    †Meleagris gallopavo – type locality for species
  - †Meleagris tridens – type locality for species
- Mellita
  - †Mellita aclinensis
  - †Mellita quinquiesperforata
- Melongena
  - †Melongena aspinosa
  - †Melongena bispinosa
  - †Melongena caloosahatcheensis
  - †Melongena cannoni
  - †Melongena chickee
  - †Melongena consors
  - †Melongena corona
  - †Melongena crassicornuta
  - †Melongena cynthiae
  - †Melongena diegelae
  - †Melongena draperi
  - †Melongena holeylandica
  - †Melongena lindae
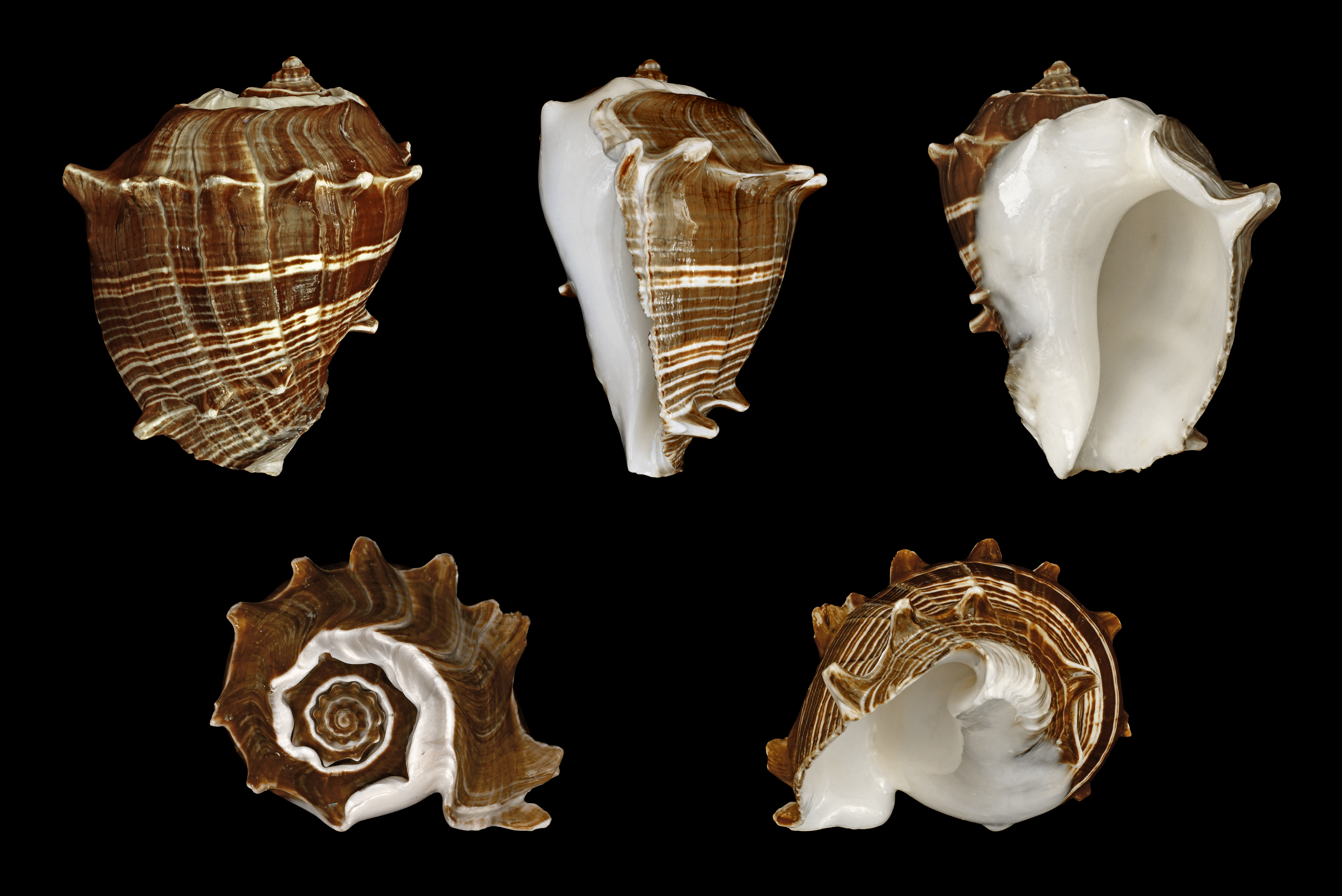
  - Shell in multiple views of a Melongena melongena, or Caribbean crown conch
    †Melongena melongena
  - †Melongena sarasotaensis
  - †Melongena sculpturata
  - †Melongena taurus
  - †Melongena turricula
- Melospiza
  - †Melospiza georgiana
  - †Melospiza melodia
- Membranipora – or unidentified comparable form
- Membraniporella
  - †Membraniporella compressa
- Membraniporidra
  - †Membraniporidra spissimuralis
- †Memraniporidra
  - †Memraniporidra similis
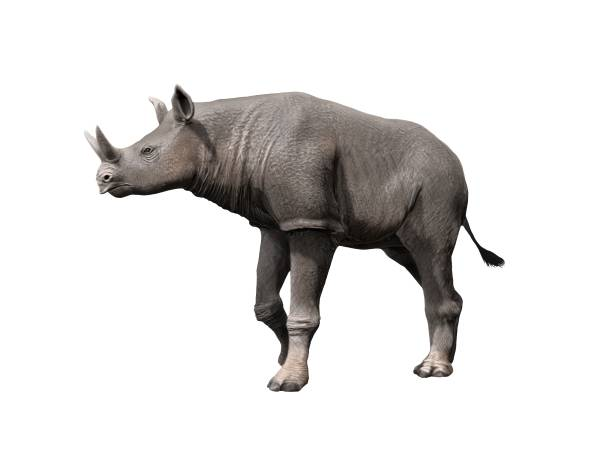
- Life restoration of the Miocene rhinoceros Menoceras
  †Menoceras
  - †Menoceras arikarense
  - †Menoceras barbouri
- Menticirrhus
- Mephitis
  - †Mephitis elongata
  - †Mephitis mephitis
- Mercenaria
  - †Mercenaria campechiensis
  - †Mercenaria carolinensis
  - †Mercenaria corrugata
  - †Mercenaria langdoni
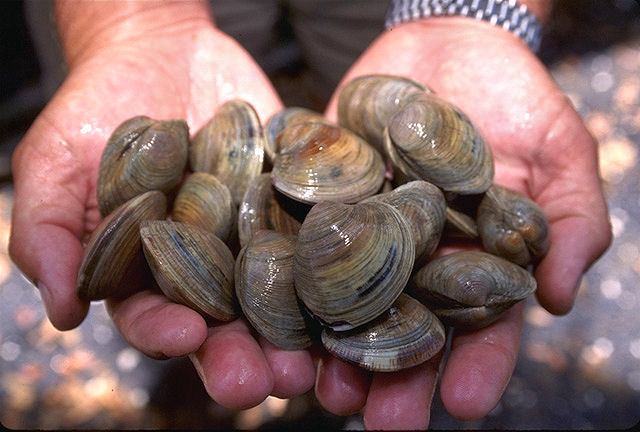
  - Collection of Mercenaria mercenaria, also known as hard clams or quahogs
    †Mercenaria mercenaria
  - †Mercenaria nannodes – type locality for species
  - †Mercenaria ochlockoneensis
  - †Mercenaria permagna
  - †Mercenaria prodona
  - †Mercenaria prodroma – type locality for species
- Meretrix
  - †Meretrix floridana
  - †Meretrix imitabilis – or unidentified related form
  - †Meretrix waltonensis – type locality for species
- Mergus
  - †Mergus merganser
  - †Mergus serrator
- Merisca
  - †Merisca aequistriata
  - †Merisca halidona
  - †Merisca merula
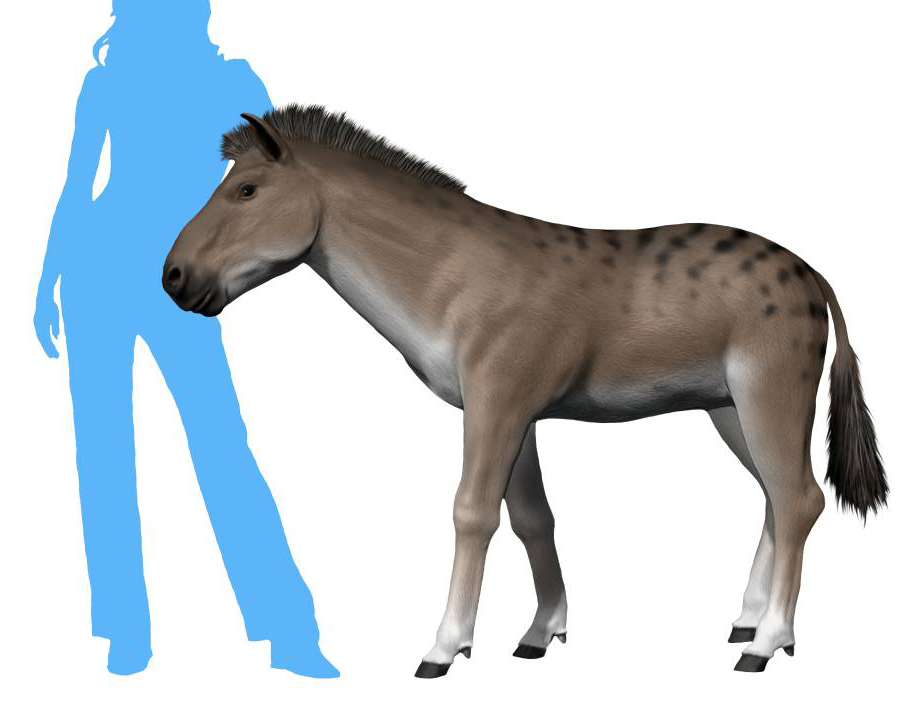
- Life restoration of the Miocene three-toed horse Merychippus
  †Merychippus
  - †Merychippus brevidontus – or unidentified comparable form
  - †Merychippus californicus – or unidentified comparable form
  - †Merychippus gunteri – type locality for species
  - †Merychippus primus
- †Merycoidodon
- Mesoplodon
  - †Mesoplodon longirostris
- †Mesoreodon
  - †Mesoreodon floridensis – type locality for species
- †Metatomarctus
  - †Metatomarctus canavus
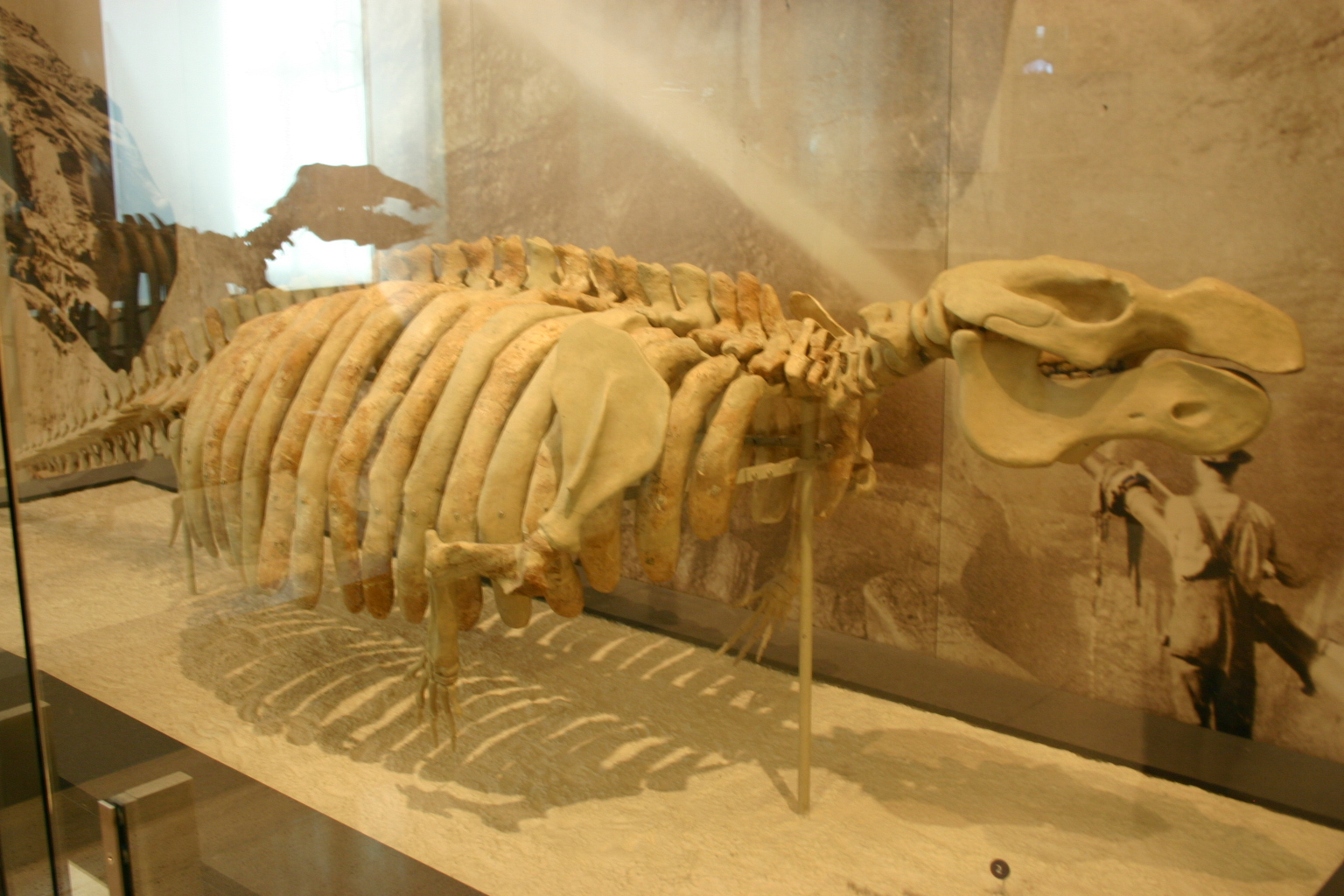
- Mounted fossilized skeleton of the Miocene-Pleistocene manatee relative Metaxytherium
  †Metaxytherium – type locality for genus
  - †Metaxytherium albifontanum – type locality for species
  - †Metaxytherium crataegense – type locality for species
  - †Metaxytherium floridanum – type locality for species
- †Metracolposa
  - †Metracolposa incrustans – type locality for species
- †Metradolium
  - †Metradolium parvirimulatum
  - †Metradolium transversum
- Metula
  - †Metula roberti
- †Microcerion
  - †Microcerion floridanum
- †Microcythara
  - †Microcythara caloosahatcheensis
- Microdrillia
  - †Microdrillia hebetika – type locality for species
- Microhyla
- Micromenetus
  - †Micromenetus alabamensis
  - †Micromenetus diatatus
  - †Micromenetus dilatatus
- Micropogonias
- Micropora
  - †Micropora coriacea
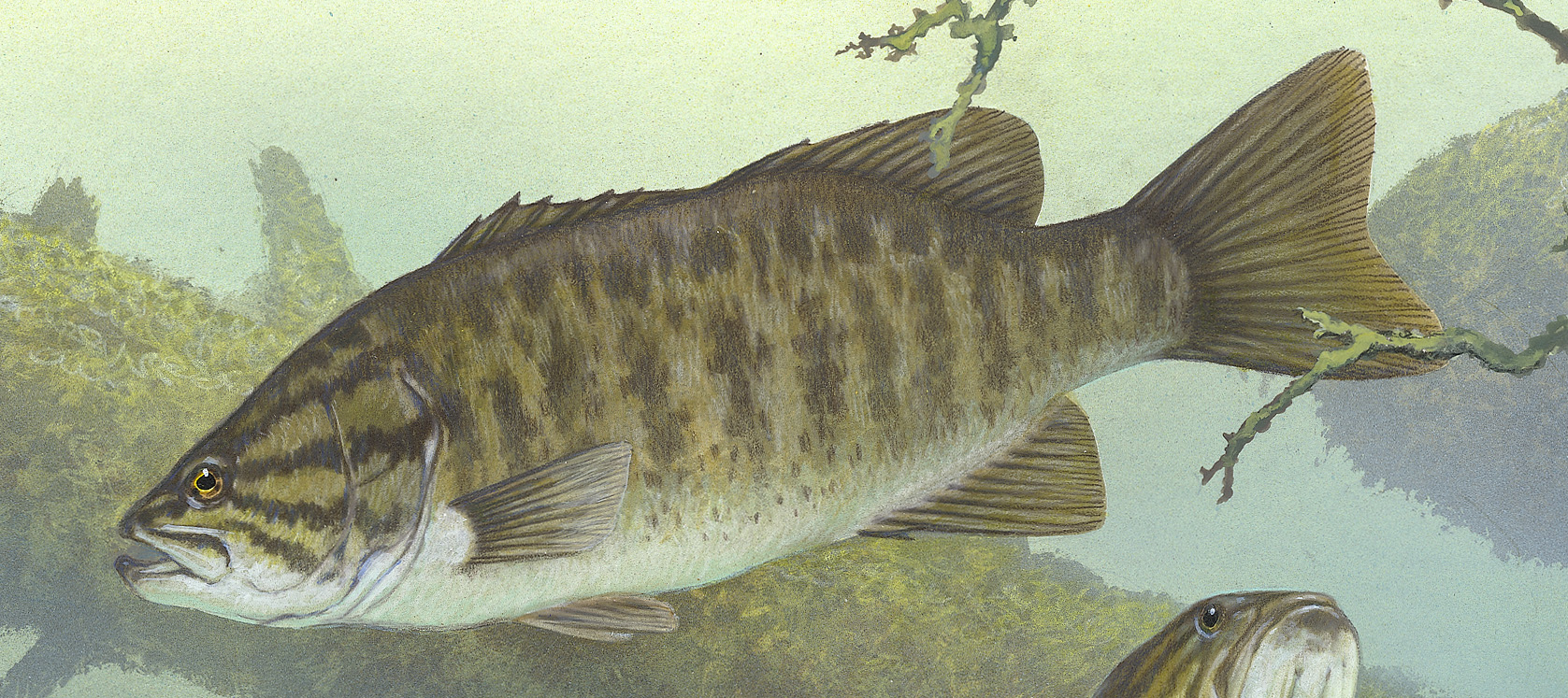
- Illustration of a living Micropterus, or black bass
  Micropterus
  - †Micropterus salmoides
- Microtus
  - †Microtus australis
  - †Microtus hibbardi
  - †Microtus pennsylvanicus
  - †Microtus pinetorum
- Micrurus
  - †Micrurus fulvius
- Millepora
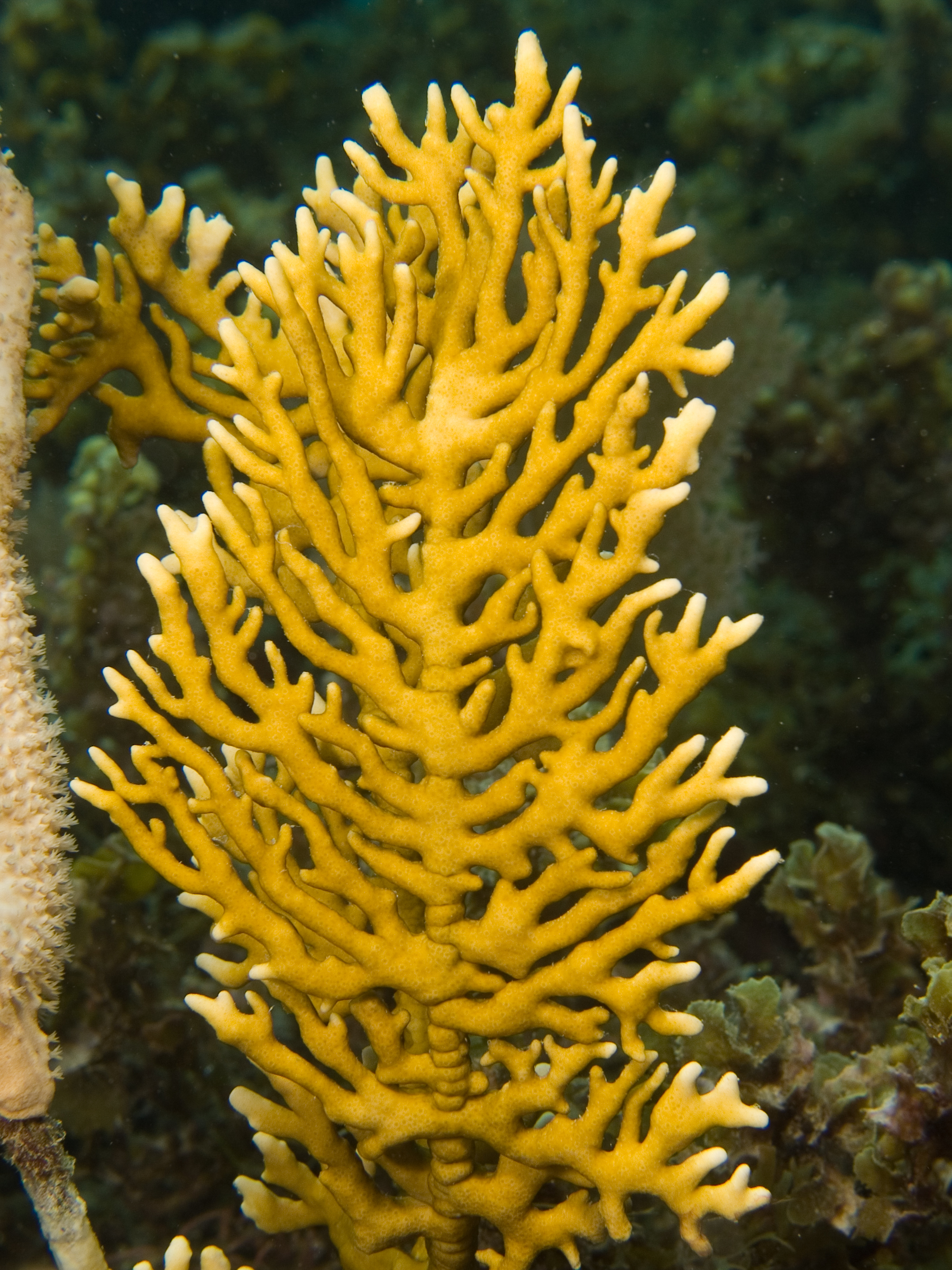
  - Living Millepora alcicornis, or sea ginger
    †Millepora alcicornis
- Miltha
  - †Miltha caloosaensis
  - †Miltha carmenae – type locality for species
  - †Miltha chipolana
  - †Miltha chipolanus
  - †Miltha hillsboroensis
- Milvago
  - †Milvago chimachima
- †Mimus
  - †Mimus polyglottos
- †Miogypsina
  - †Miogypsina globulina
- †Miohippus
- †Miomyotis – type locality for genus
  - †Miomyotis floridanus – type locality for species
- †Miopetaurista
  - †Miopetaurista webbi – type locality for species
- †Miospermophilus – or unidentified comparable form
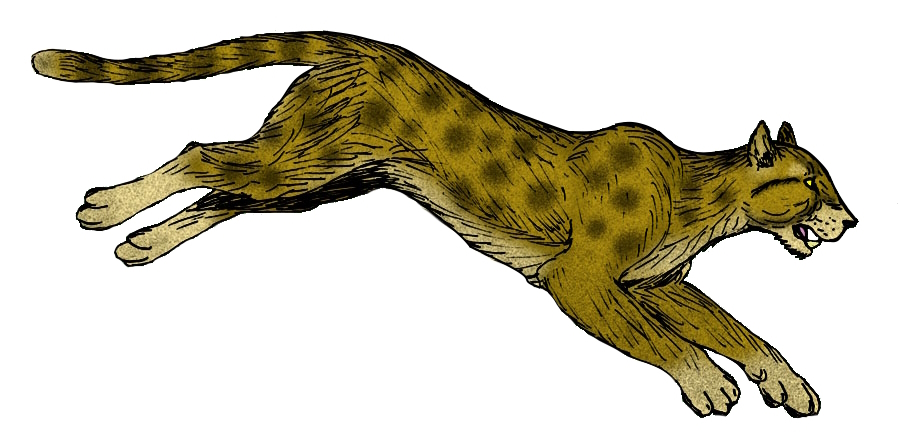
- Restoration of the Pliocene-Pleistocene Miracinonyx, or American cheetah
  †Miracinonyx
  - †Miracinonyx inexpectatus
- Mitra
  - †Mitra acteoglypha – type locality for species
  - †Mitra carolinensis
  - †Mitra desmia – type locality for species
  - †Mitra heilprini
  - †Mitra heilpriri
  - †Mitra hosfordensis
  - †Mitra lindae
  - †Mitra lineolata
  - †Mitra mitrodita – type locality for species
  - †Mitra prodroma – type locality for species
  - †Mitra semiferruginea
  - †Mitra silicata
  - †Mitra stephensoni
- Mitrella
  - †Mitrella acanthodes
  - †Mitrella alumen – type locality for species
  - †Mitrella asema – type locality for species
  - †Mitrella belonis – type locality for species
  - †Mitrella blastos – type locality for species
  - †Mitrella dalli
  - †Mitrella dallina – type locality for species
  - †Mitrella dicaria
  - †Mitrella eluthera
  - †Mitrella gardnerae
  - †Mitrella hayesorum – type locality for species
  - †Mitrella ischna – type locality for species
  - †Mitrella juncea – type locality for species
  - †Mitrella mikra – type locality for species
  - †Mitrella nanna – type locality for species
  - †Mitrella oryzoides – type locality for species
  - †Mitrella oxia – type locality for species
  - †Mitrella pedana – type locality for species
  - †Mitrella perfervida
  - †Mitrella phagon – type locality for species
  - †Mitrella photeina – type locality for species
  - †Mitrella phyllisae – type locality for species
  - †Mitrella sima – type locality for species
  - †Mitrella stikta – type locality for species
  - †Mitrella trajectionis
  - †Mitrella turgidula
  - †Mitrella tytha – type locality for species
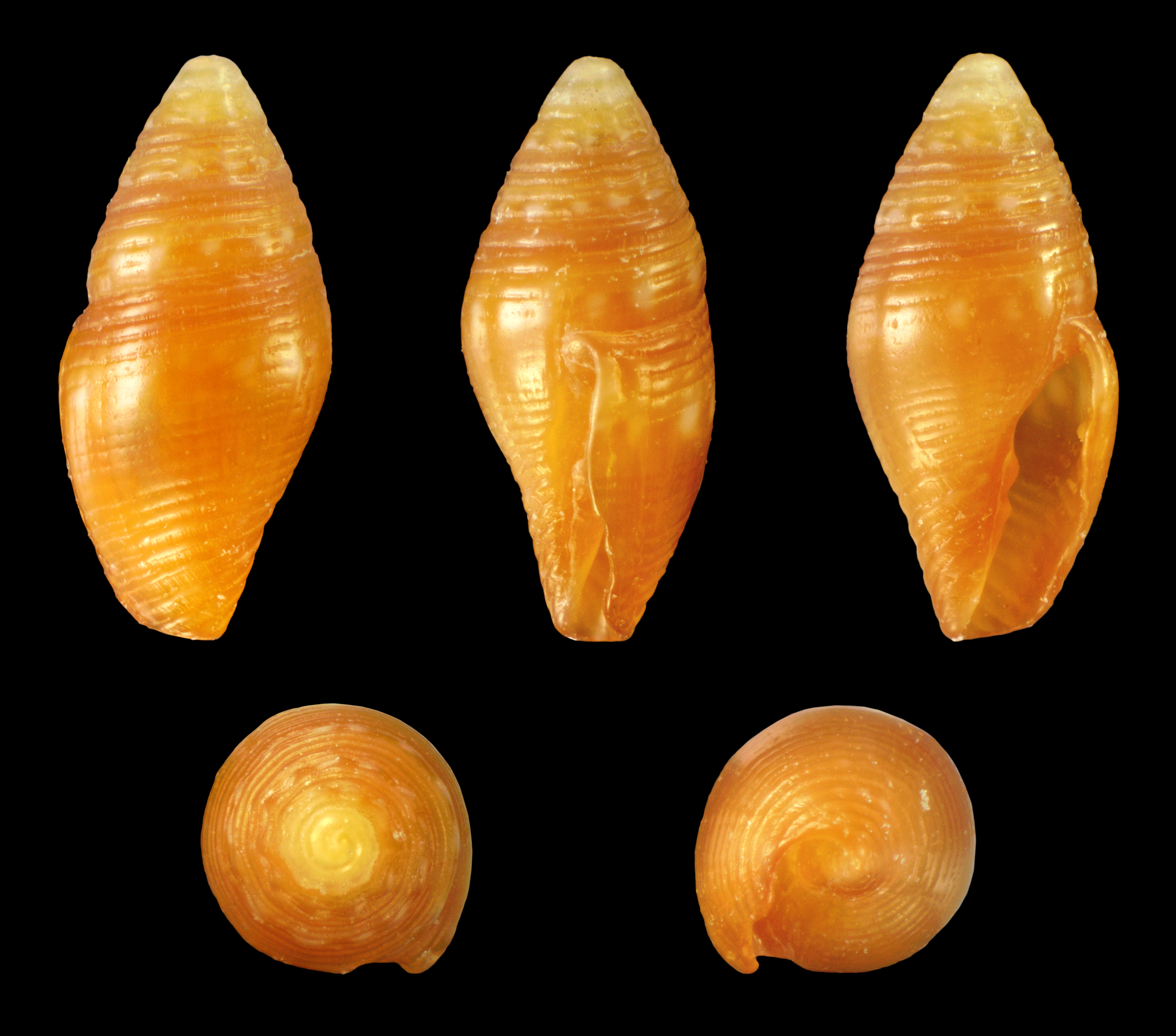
- Multiple views of a shell of a Mitromorpha sea snail
  Mitromorpha
  - †Mitromorpha dormitor
- Modiolaria
- Modiolus
  - †Modiolus americanus
  - †Modiolus blandus
  - †Modiolus grammatus
  - †Modiolus minimus
  - †Modiolus silicatus
- Modulus
  - †Modulus basileus
  - †Modulus biconicus – type locality for species
  - †Modulus caloosahatcheensis
  - †Modulus calusa
  - †Modulus carchedonius
  - †Modulus compactus
  - †Modulus liveoakensis
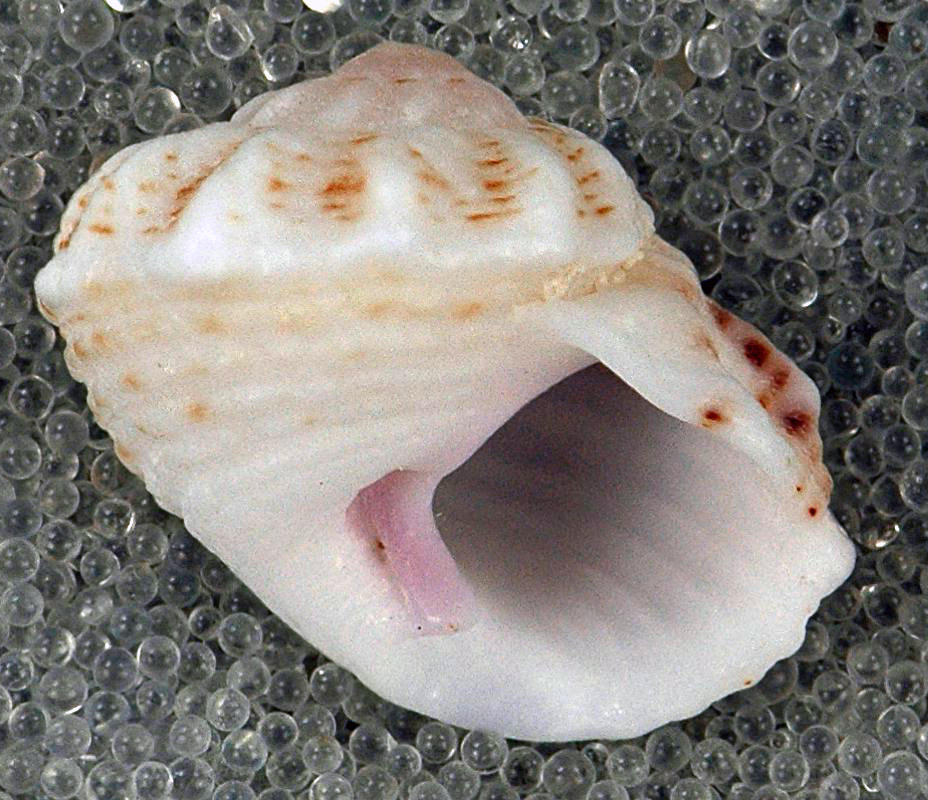
  - A living Modulus modulus, or tulip mussel
    †Modulus modulus
  - †Modulus pacei
  - †Modulus turbinatus
  - †Modulus willcoxii
  - †Modulus woodringi
- Moerella
  - †Moerella calliglypta
  - †Moerella candeana
- †Molleria
  - †Molleria duplinensis
- Molothrus
  - †Molothrus ater
- Monilispira
  - †Monilispira archeri
  - †Monilispira leucocyma – or unidentified comparable form
- Monoplex
  - †Monoplex – type locality for species A informal
  - †Monoplex krebsii
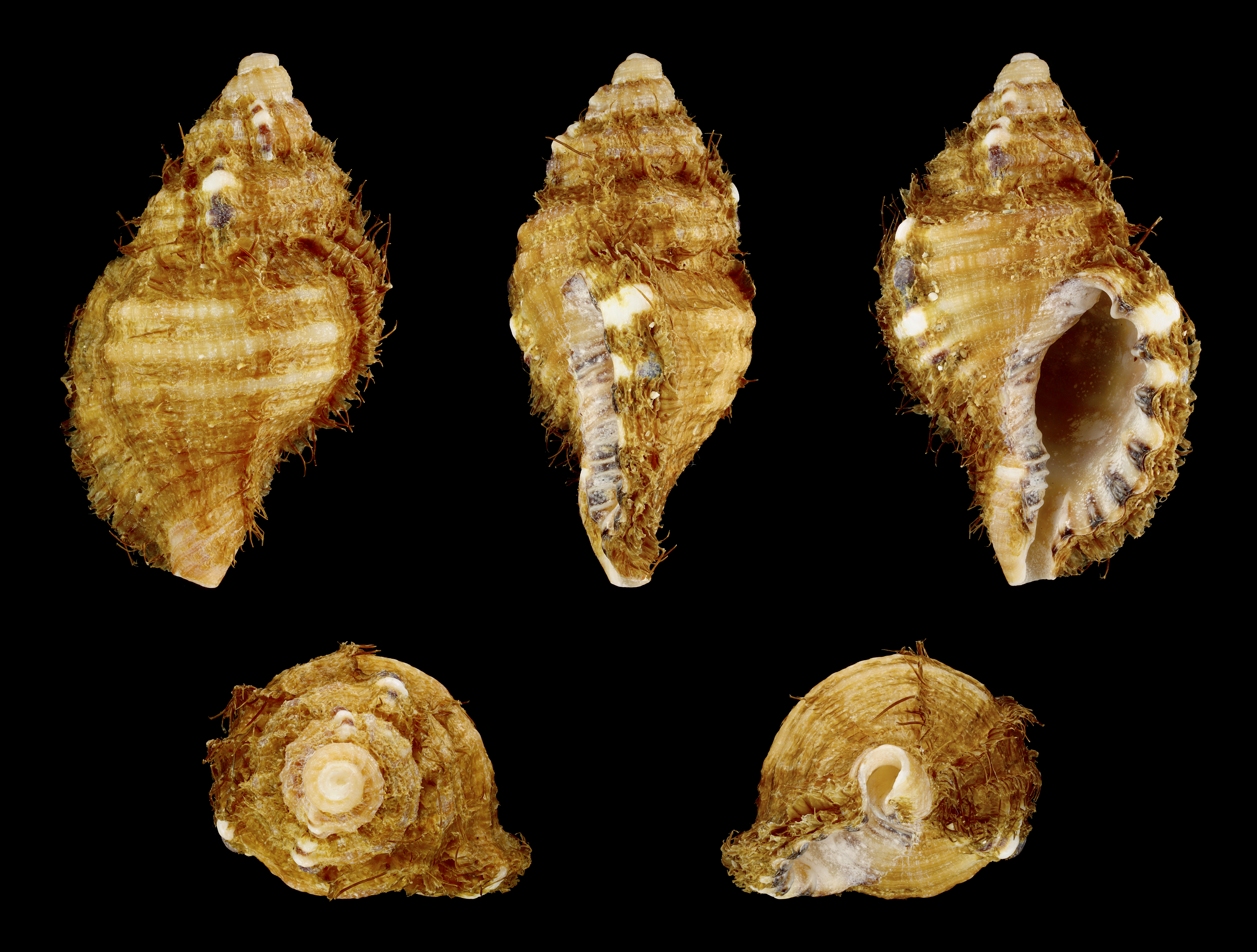
  - Shell in multiple views of a Monoplex parthenopeus, or giant triton
    †Monoplex parthenopeus
  - †Monoplex ritteri
- †Monostiolum
  - †Monostiolum petiti
  - †Monostiolum thomasi
- †Montacula
- Montacuta
  - †Montacuta chipolana
  - †Montacuta floridana
- Montastraea
  - †Montastraea bainbridgensis
  - †Montastraea brevis
  - †Montastraea cavernosa
  - †Montastraea costata – or unidentified comparable form
  - †Montastraea davisina – type locality for species
  - †Montastraea endothecata
  - †Montastraea imbata
  - †Montastraea intermedia
  - †Montastraea peninsularis – type locality for species
  - †Montastraea tampaensis
- †Montezumella
  - †Montezumella microporosa
- Mormoops
  - †Mormoops megalophylla
- †Moropus
  - †Moropus oregonensis – or unidentified comparable form
- †Mortonella
- Morum
  - †Morum chipolanum – type locality for species
  - †Morum floridanum
  - †Morum macgintyi
  - †Morum obrienae
  - †Morum oniscus
- Morus
  - †Morus peninsularis – type locality for species
- Mugil
- †Mulina
  - †Mulina congesta
  - †Mulina orthria – type locality for species
- Mulinia
  - †Mulinia caloosaensis
  - †Mulinia congesta
  - †Mulinia lateralis
  - †Mulinia orthria
  - †Mulinia sapotila
  - †Mulinia sapotilia
  - †Mulinia sapotilla
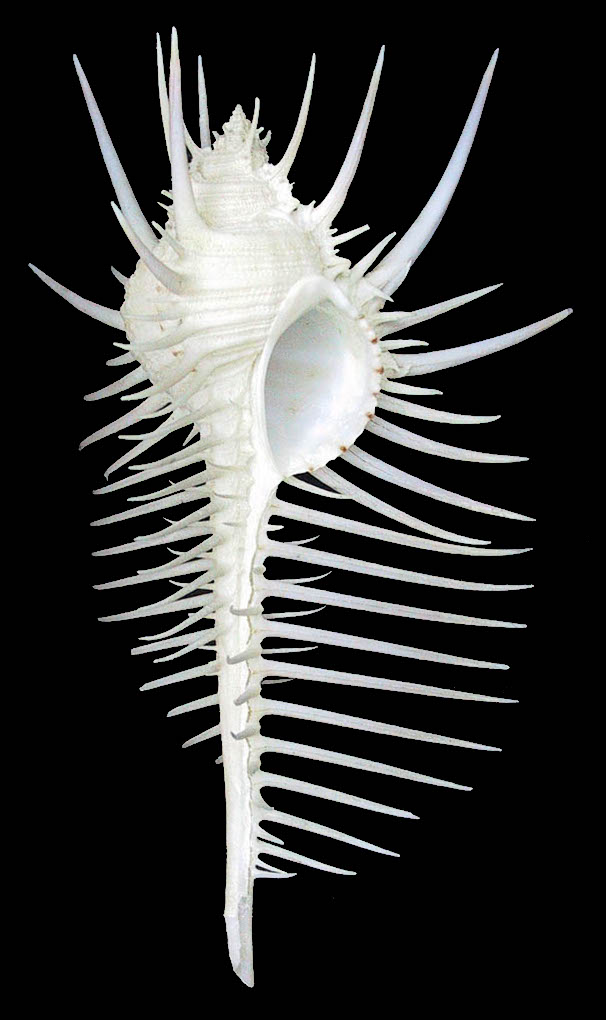
- Shell of a Murex sea snail
  Murex
  - †Murex bellegladensis
  - †Murex chipolanus
  - †Murex fulvenscens
  - †Murex gilli – type locality for species
  - †Murex globosus
  - †Murex nicholsi – type locality for species
  - †Murex salleanus
  - †Murex tritonopsis
  - †Murex trophoniformis
- Murexiella
  - †Murexiella calhounensis – type locality for species
  - †Murexiella crispangula
  - †Murexiella glypta
  - †Murexiella graceae
  - †Murexiella macgintyi – type locality for species
  - †Murexiella miamiensis
  - †Murexiella petuchi
  - †Murexiella shilohensis
  - †Murexiella textilis
- Murexsul
  - †Murexsul hexagonus
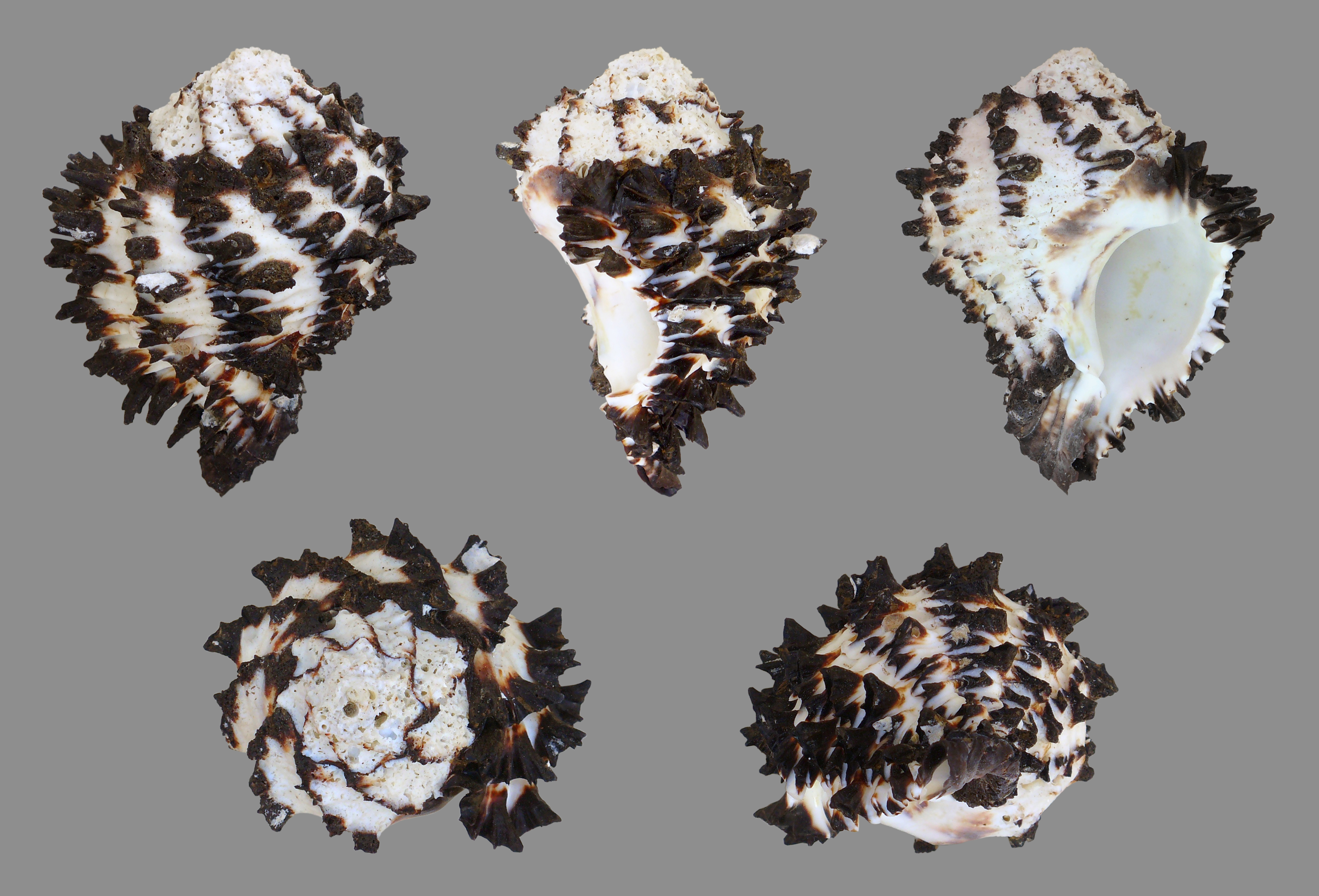
- Shell in multiple views of a Muricanthus murex sea snail
  Muricanthus
  - †Muricanthus hertweckorum
- Muricopsis
  - †Muricopsis lyonsi
- Musculium
  - †Musculium securis
- Musculus
  - †Musculus lateralis
- Mussa
  - †Mussa affinis
  - †Mussa angulosa
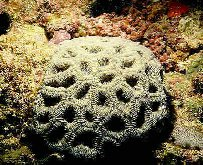
- Living Mussismilia stony coral
  Mussismilia
  - †Mussismilia hispida
- Mustela
  - †Mustela frenata
  - †Mustela peninsulae
- †Mya
  - †Mya arenaria
- †Myakkacypraea
  - †Myakkacypraea kelleyi
  - †Myakkacypraea myakka
  - †Myakkacypraea schnireli
- Mycetophyllia
  - †Mycetophyllia lamarckiana
- Mycteria
  - †Mycteria americana
  - †Mycteria wetmorei
- †Mylagaulus
  - †Mylagaulus elassos – type locality for species
  - †Mylagaulus kinseyi
- Myliobatis
- †Mylodon
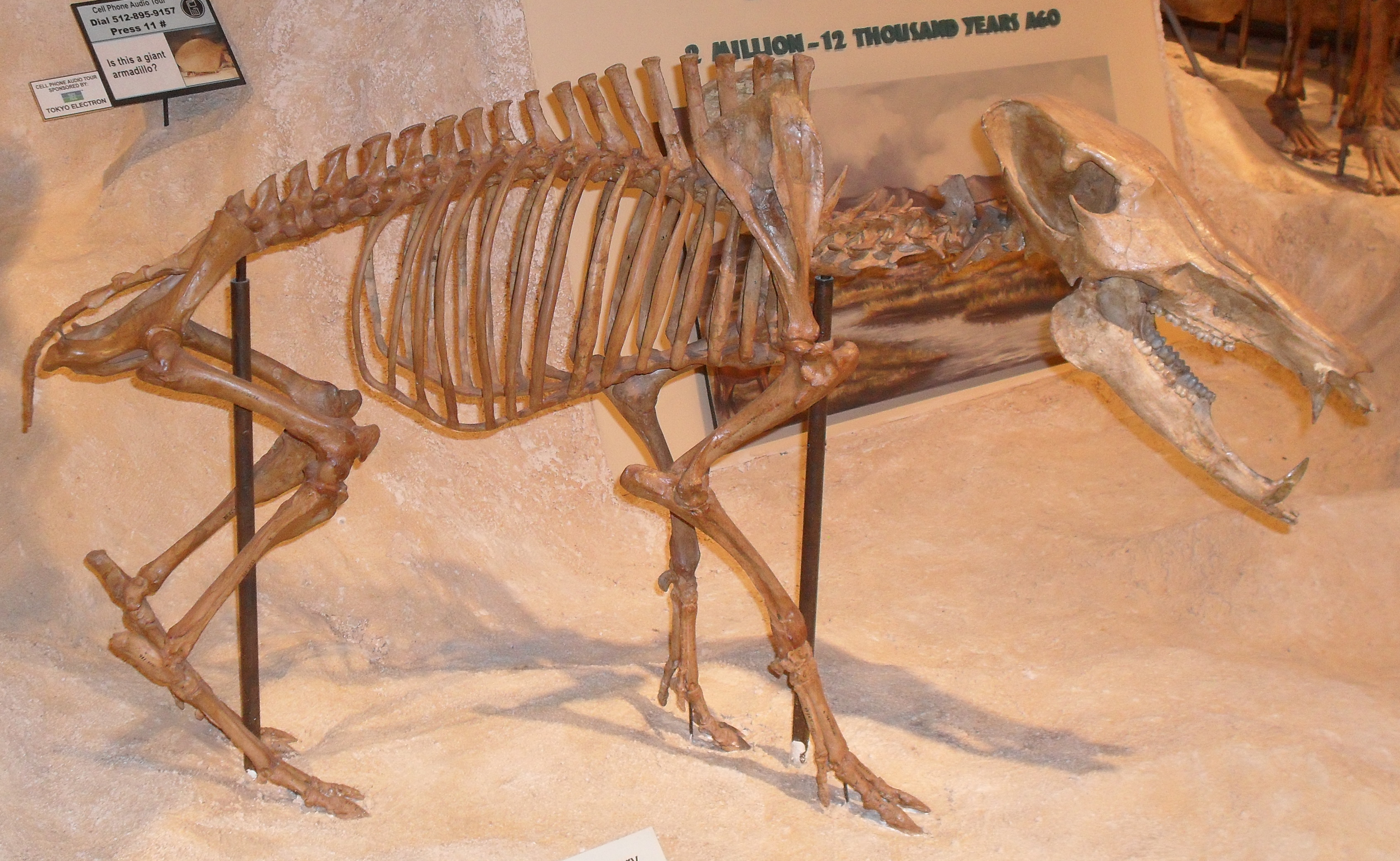
- Fossilized skeleton of the Pliocene-Holocene peccary Mylohyus
  †Mylohyus
  - †Mylohyus elmorei
  - †Mylohyus floridanus – type locality for species
  - †Mylohyus fossilis – type locality for species
  - †Mylohyus lenis – or unidentified comparable form
- Myotis
  - †Myotis austroriparius
  - †Myotis grisescens
- Myrica
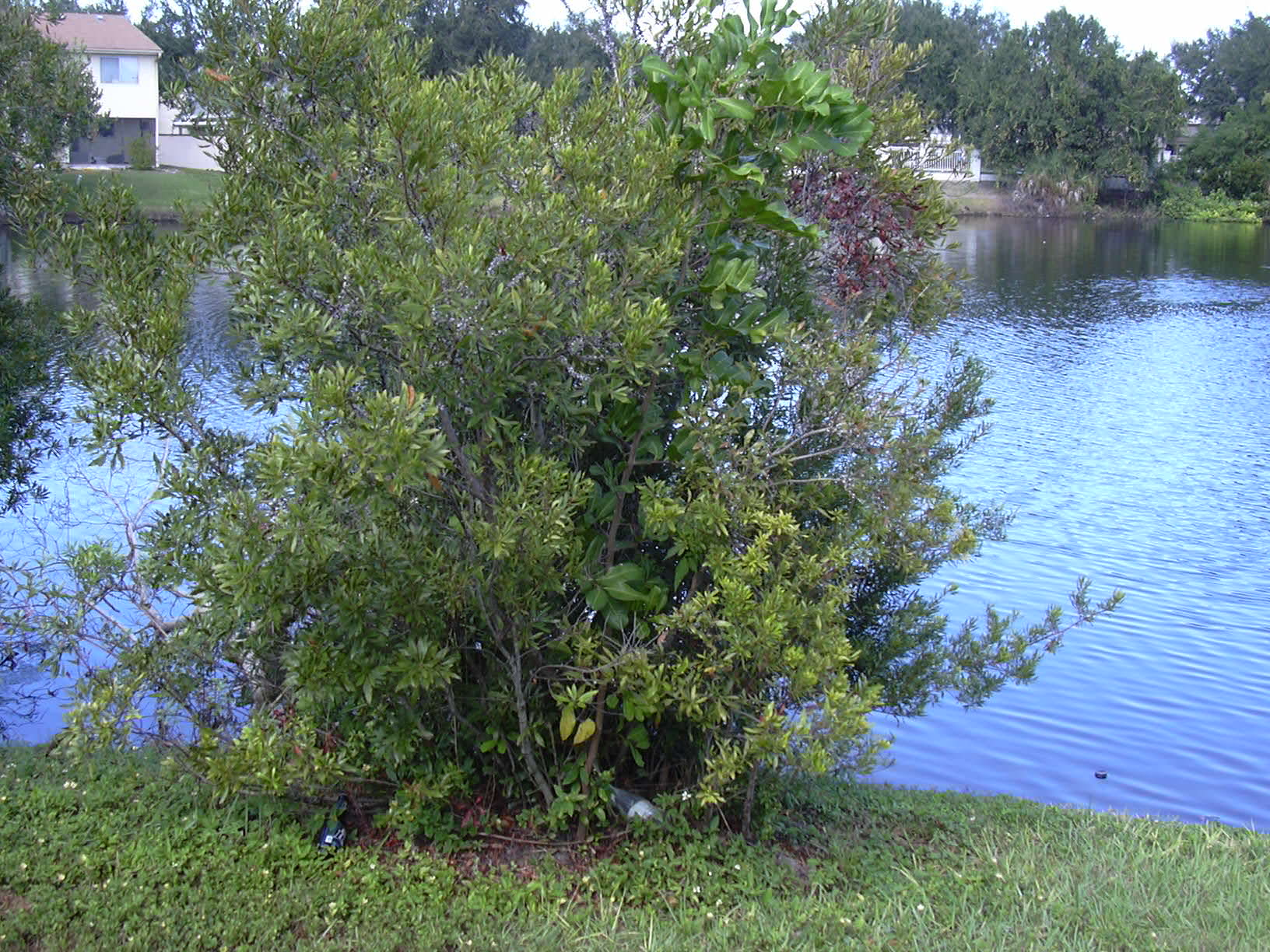
  - A living Myrica cerifera, or southern wax myrtle
    †Myrica cerifera
- Myrtea
  - †Myrtea waltonensis – type locality for species
- Mysella
  - †Mysella planulata
- Mytiloconcha
  - †Mytiloconcha conradiana
  - †Mytiloconcha incurvus
- Mytilopsis
  - †Mytilopsis lamellata
  - †Mytilopsis leucophaeata
- Mytilus
  - †Mytilus conradiana
  - †Mytilus conradianus
  - †Mytilus incrassata

== N ==
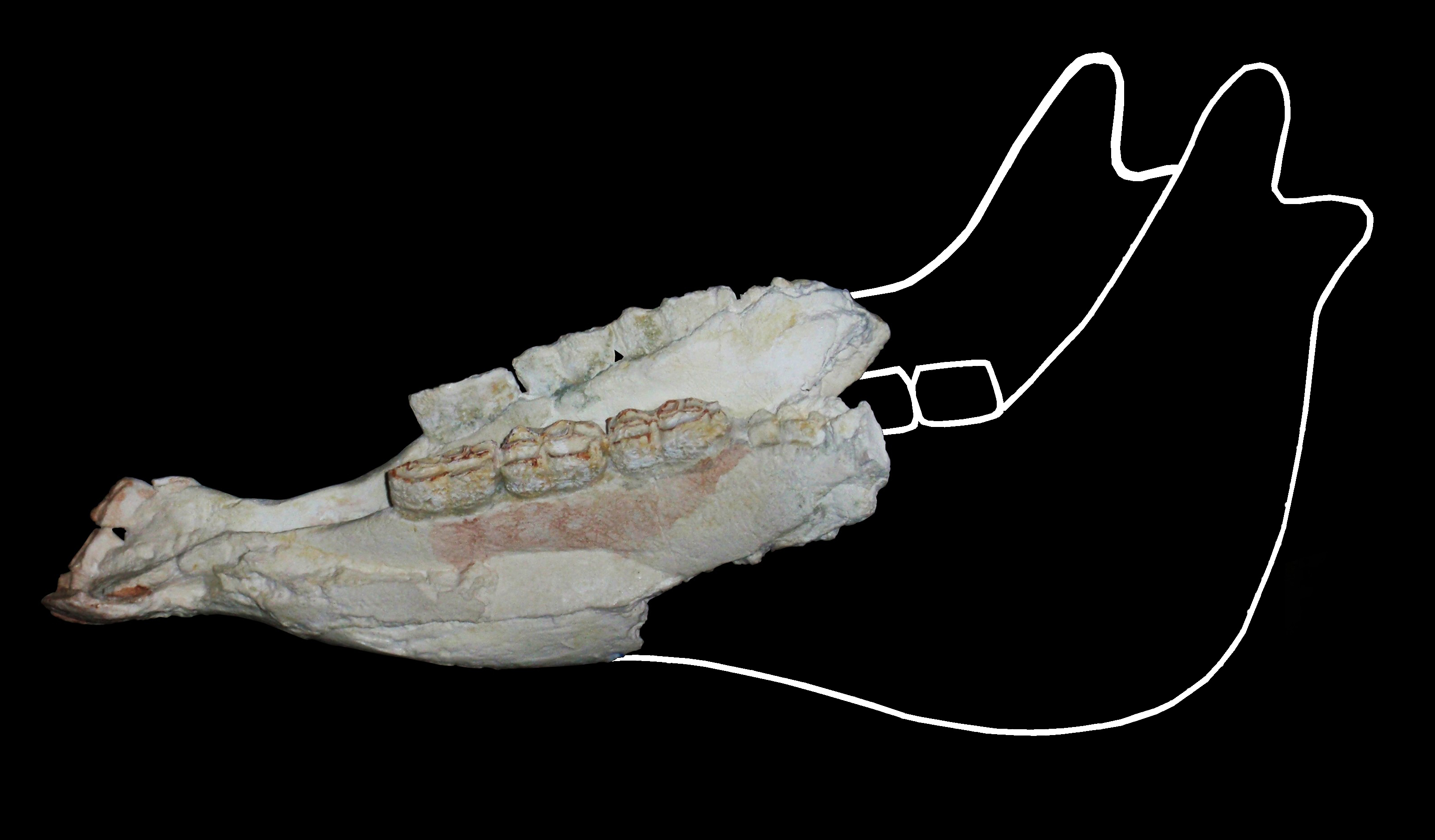
- Partial fossilized mandible of the Miocene-Pliocene horse Nannippus
  †Nannippus
  - †Nannippus aztecus
  - †Nannippus morgani
  - †Nannippus peninsulatus
  - †Nannippus westoni
- Nannodiella
  - †Nannodiella nemorensis
  - †Nannodiella pauca
- †Nanogyra
  - †Nanogyra virgula
- †Nanosiren – type locality for genus
  - †Nanosiren garciae – type locality for species
- †Nanotragulus
  - †Nanotragulus loomisi
- Narona
  - †Narona atraktoides – type locality for species
- Nassa – report made of unidentified related form or using admittedly obsolete nomenclature
  - †Nassa consensa – or unidentified comparable form
- Nassarina
  - †Nassarina glypta
  - †Nassarina trachea – type locality for species
- Nassarius
  - †Nassarius acutus
  - †Nassarius anisonema – type locality for species
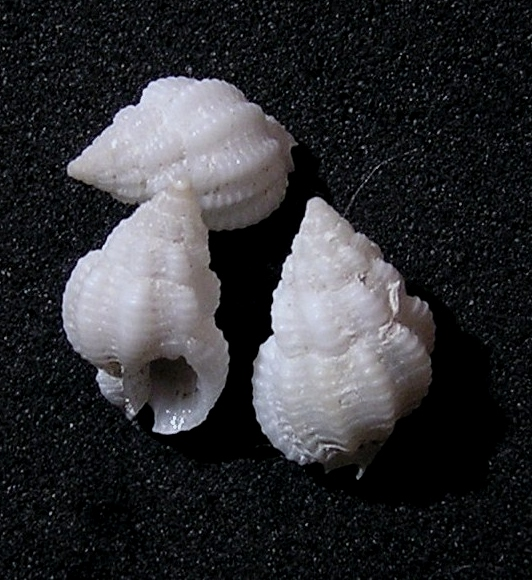
  - Shells in differing orientations of a Phrontis antillara (formerly Nassarius antillarum), or the Antilles nassa sea snail
    †Nassarius antillarum
  - †Nassarius berthae
  - †Nassarius bidentata
  - †Nassarius bidentatus
  - †Nassarius bimitrodita – type locality for species
  - †Nassarius caloosaensis
  - †Nassarius cinclis – type locality for species
  - †Nassarius consensa
  - †Nassarius consensus – or unidentified comparable form
  - †Nassarius cornelliana
  - †Nassarius correlliana
  - †Nassarius cystoides – type locality for species
  - †Nassarius dalli
  - †Nassarius dasa – type locality for species
  - †Nassarius dasus
  - †Nassarius dasynema – type locality for species
  - †Nassarius dryas – type locality for species
  - †Nassarius dystakta
  - †Nassarius dystaktus
  - †Nassarius ethelinda
  - †Nassarius eutykta – type locality for species
  - †Nassarius fargoi
  - †Nassarius floridana
  - †Nassarius floridensis
  - †Nassarius grapta
  - †Nassarius harisi – or unidentified related form
  - †Nassarius harrisi
  - †Nassarius ischna – type locality for species
  - †Nassarius locklini
  - †Nassarius nanna – type locality for species
  - †Nassarius nannus
  - †Nassarius opeas – type locality for species
  - †Nassarius oxia – type locality for species
  - †Nassarius parapristuis
  - †Nassarius parapristus – type locality for species
  - †Nassarius pedana – type locality for species
  - †Nassarius pedanus
  - †Nassarius pedona
  - †Nassarius prista – type locality for species
  - †Nassarius pristus
  - †Nassarius quadridentata
  - †Nassarius rasta
  - †Nassarius tribaka – type locality for species
  - †Nassarius vibex
  - †Nassarius waltonensis
  - †Nassarius watsoni
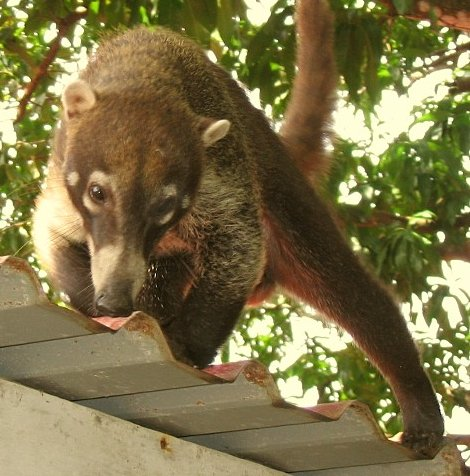
- A living Nasua, or coati
  Nasua – or unidentified comparable form
- Natica
  - †Natica alticallosa
  - †Natica caseyi
- Naticarius
  - †Naticarius camera
  - †Naticarius canrena
  - †Naticarius plicatella
  - †Naticarius precursor – type locality for species
- Natrix
  - †Natrix cyclopion
  - †Natrix erythrogaster – or unidentified comparable form
- †Neatocastor
- †Nebraskaophis
  - †Nebraskaophis oligocenicus – type locality for species
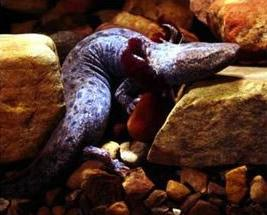
- A living Necturus, or mudpuppy
  Necturus
- Negaprion
  - †Negaprion brevirostris
- †Nekrolagus
  - †Nekrolagus progressus
- Nellia
  - †Nellia oscitans – type locality for species
  - †Nellia tenella
- Nemocardium
  - †Nemocardium parile
- †Neochoerus
  - †Neochoerus aesopi
  - †Neochoerus pinckneyi
- Neofiber
  - †Neofiber alleni
  - †Neofiber leonardi
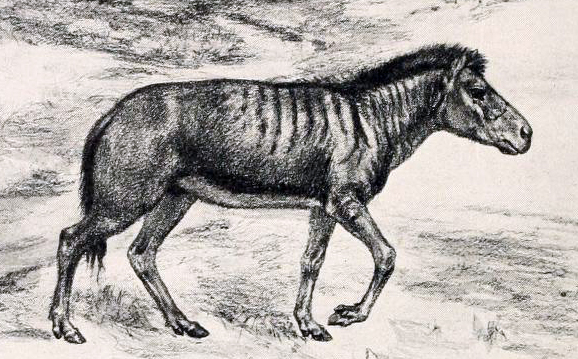
- Life restoration of a herd of Neohipparion. Robert Bruce Horsfall (1913).
  †Neohipparion
  - †Neohipparion eurystyle
  - †Neohipparion trampasense
- †Neolaganum
  - †Neolaganum dalli
  - †Neolaganum durhami
- Neomonachus
  - †Neomonachus tropicalis
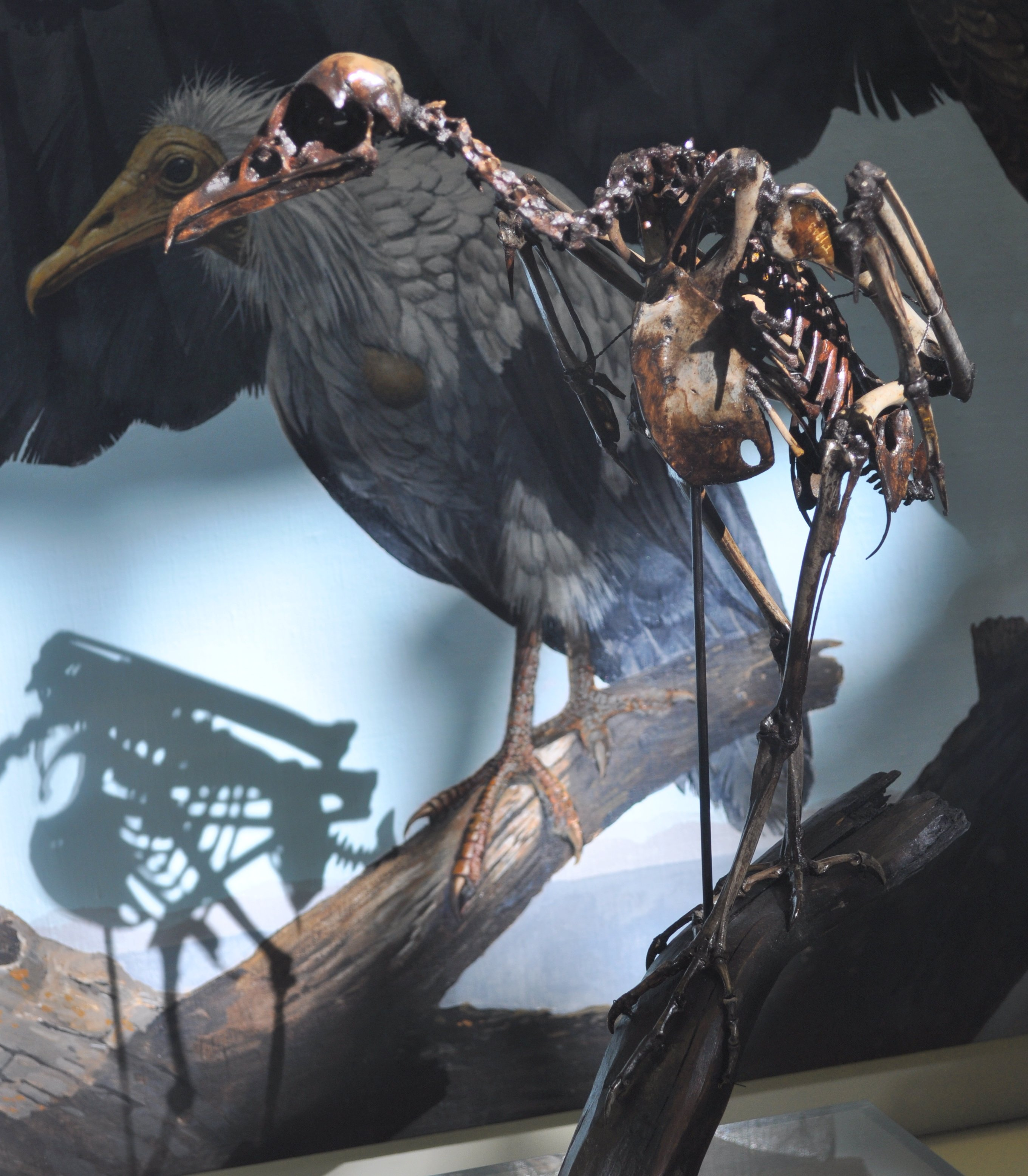
- Mounted fossilized skeleton of the Miocene Neophrontops
  Neophrontops
  - †Neophrontops slaughteri
- †Neortyx
  - †Neortyx peninsularis
- †Neosimnia
  - †Neosimnia cristata – type locality for species
  - †Neosimnia puella – type locality for species
- Neotoma
  - †Neotoma floridana
- Nerita
  - †Nerita tampaensis
- Neritina
  - †Neritina sparsilineata – or unidentified comparable form
  - †Neritina sphaerica
  - †Neritina usnea
  - †Neritina virginea
- †Neritopsis
  - †Neritopsis vokesorum – type locality for species
- Nerodia
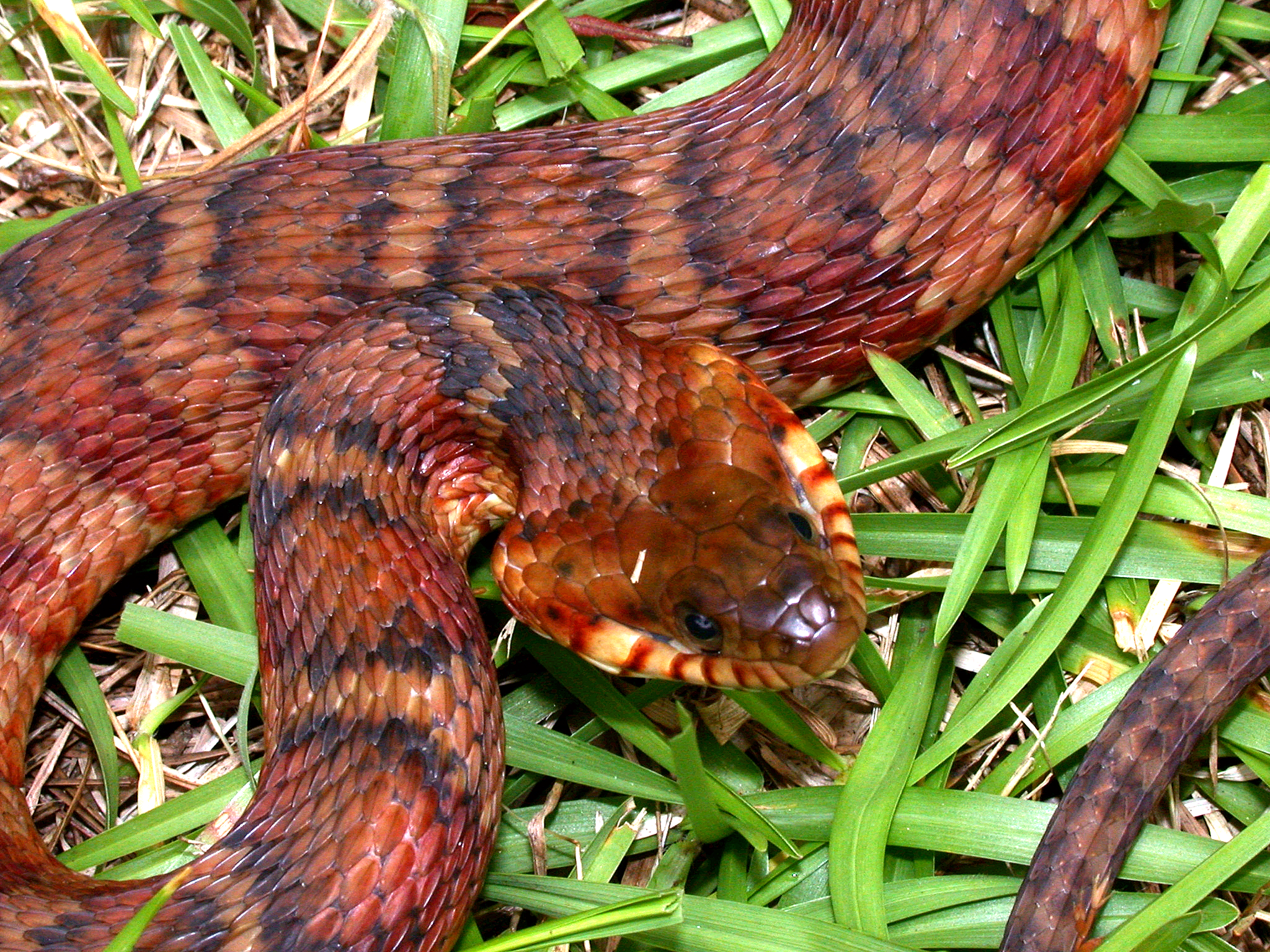
  - A living Nerodia fasciata, or banded water snake
    †Nerodia fasciata
  - †Nerodia sipedon
  - †Nerodia taxispilota – or unidentified comparable form
- Nesovitrea
  - †Nesovitrea dallilana
- Nettion
  - †Nettion carolinense
  - †Nettion crecca
- †Neurahytis
  - †Neurahytis marshalli
- Neverita
  - †Neverita chipolana
  - †Neverita chipolanus
  - †Neverita duplicatus
  - †Neverita eucallosa
  - †Neverita eucallosus – type locality for species
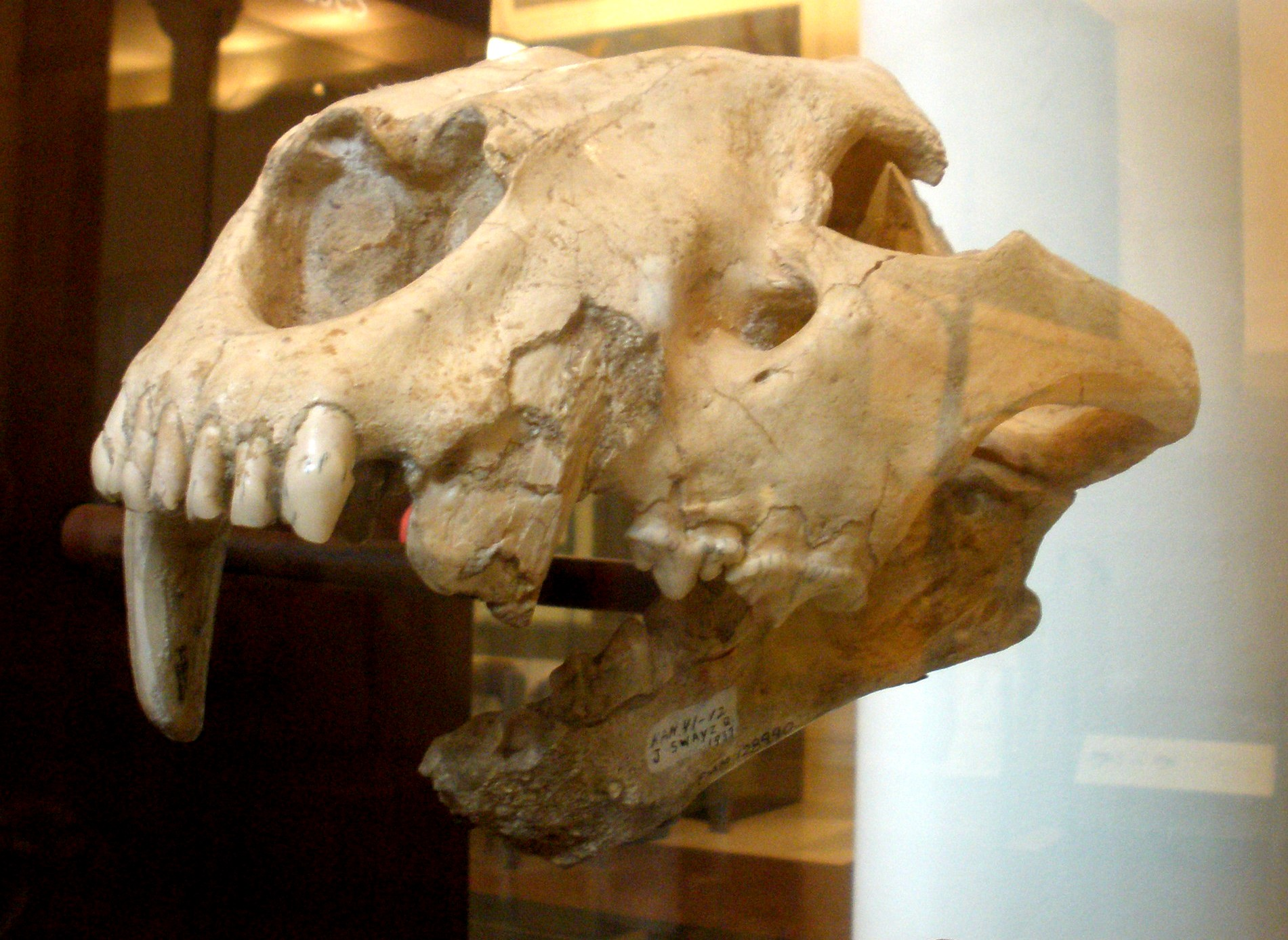
- Fossilized partial cranium of the Miocene saber-toothed cat Nimravides
  †Nimravides
  - †Nimravides galiani – type locality for species
- †Ninoziphius
  - †Ninoziphius platyrostris
- Niso
  - †Niso interrupta
  - †Niso wilcoxiana
  - †Niso willcoxiana
- Nitidella
  - †Nitidella nitida
- Niveria
  - †Niveria carlottae
  - †Niveria quadripunctata
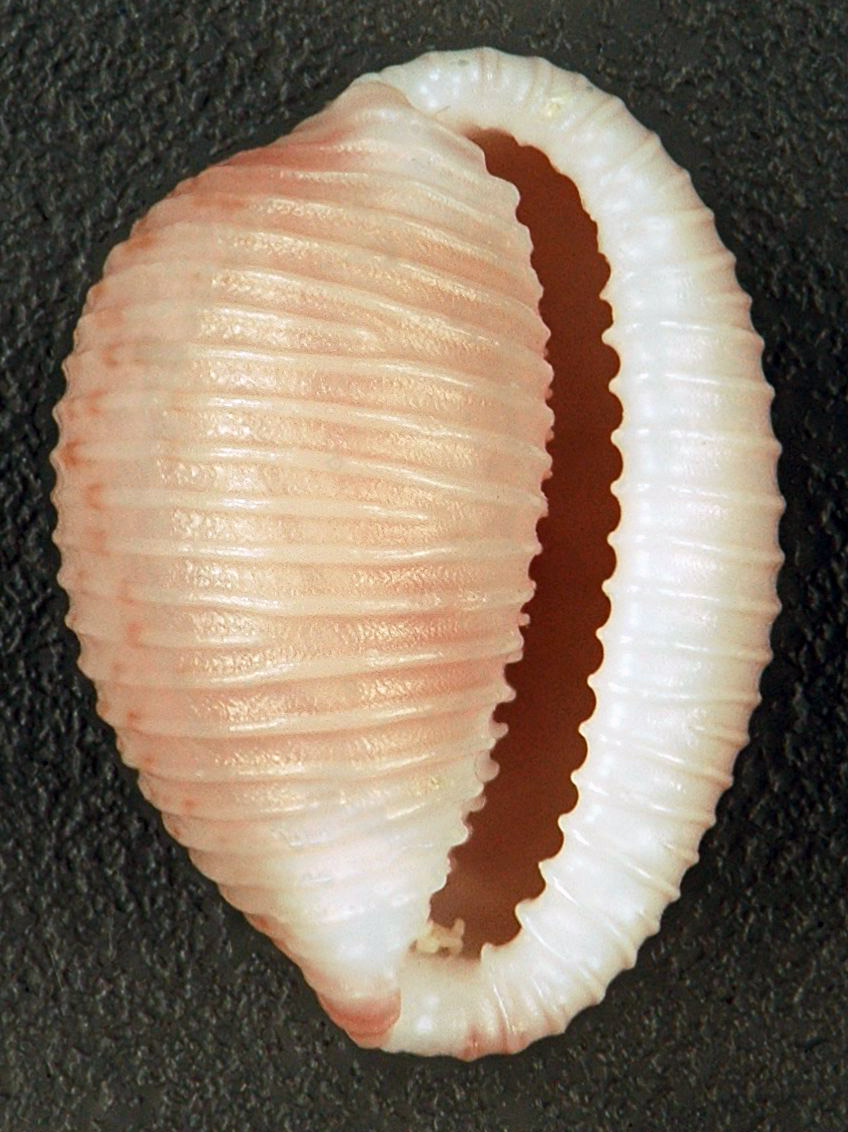
  - Shell of a Niveria suffusa false cowrie
    †Niveria suffusa
- Nodipecten
  - †Nodipecten caloosaensis
  - †Nodipecten collierensis
  - †Nodipecten condylomatus
  - †Nodipecten nodosus
  - †Nodipecten peedeensis
  - †Nodipecten peedensis
  - †Nodipecten pernodosus
  - †Nodipecten pyx
  - †Nodipecten vaccamavensis
- Noetia
  - †Noetia incile
  - †Noetia limula
  - †Noetia platyura
  - †Noetia playura
- Nonion
  - †Nonion glabrellum
  - †Nonion grateloupi
  - †Nonion pizarrensis
  - †Nonion preadvenum
  - †Nonion washingtonensis
- Nonionella
  - †Nonionella auris
- †Nothodipoides
  - †Nothodipoides planus – or unidentified comparable form
- †Nothokemas
  - †Nothokemas floridanus
  - †Nothokemas waldropi – type locality for species
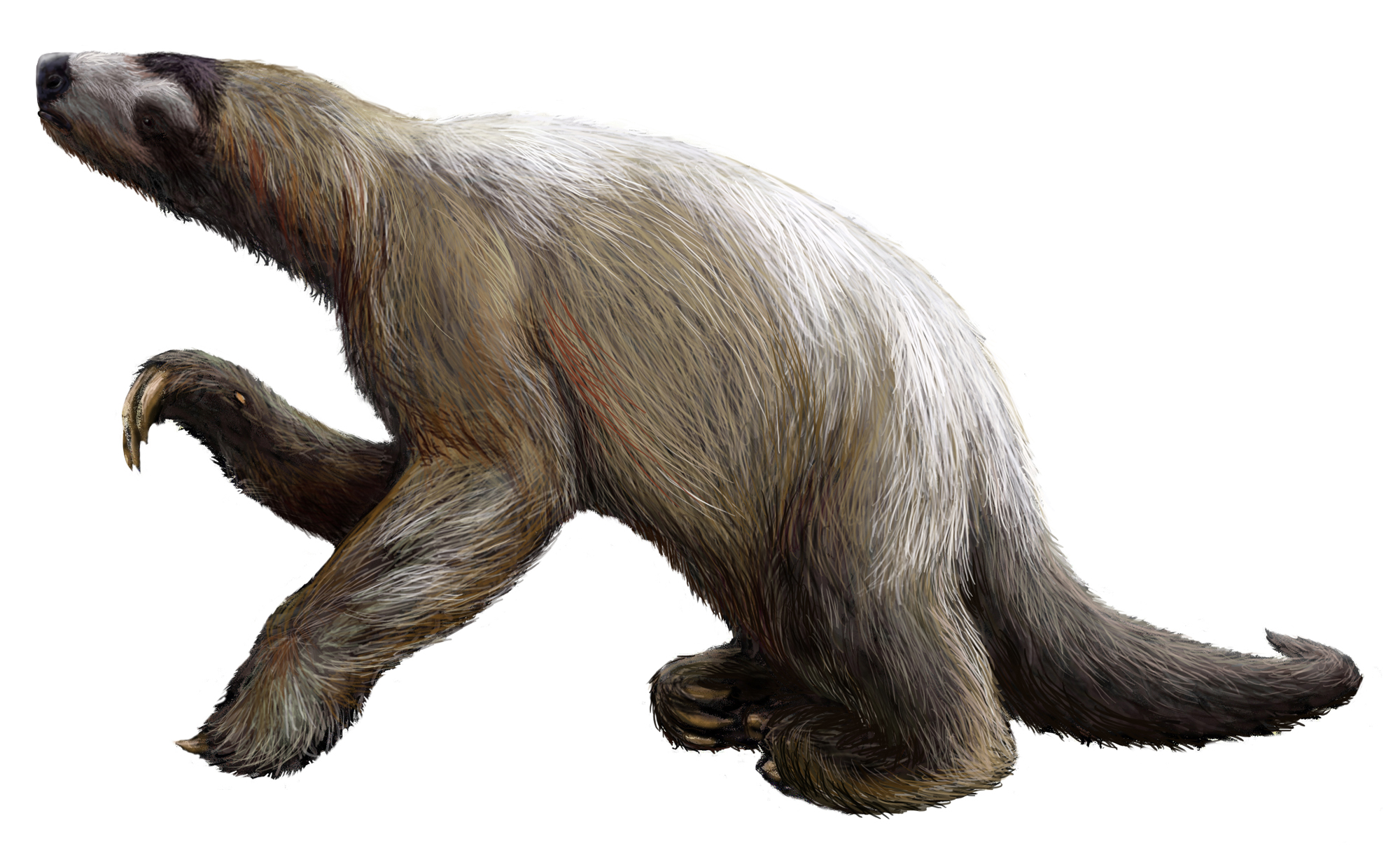
- Life restoration of the Pleistocene ground sloth Nothrotheriops
  †Nothrotheriops
  - †Nothrotheriops texanus
- Notophthalmus
  - †Notophthalmus viridescens
- Notorynchus
  - †Notorynchus cepidianus
- †Nototamias
  - †Nototamias hulberti
- Nucinella
  - †Nucinella chipolana – type locality for species
  - †Nucinella gunteri – type locality for species
  - †Nucinella woodii – type locality for species
- Nucleolites
  - †Nucleolites conradi
  - †Nucleolites ericsoni
  - †Nucleolites evergladensis – type locality for species
  - †Nucleolites globosus
  - †Nucleolites gouldii
  - †Nucleolites lyelli
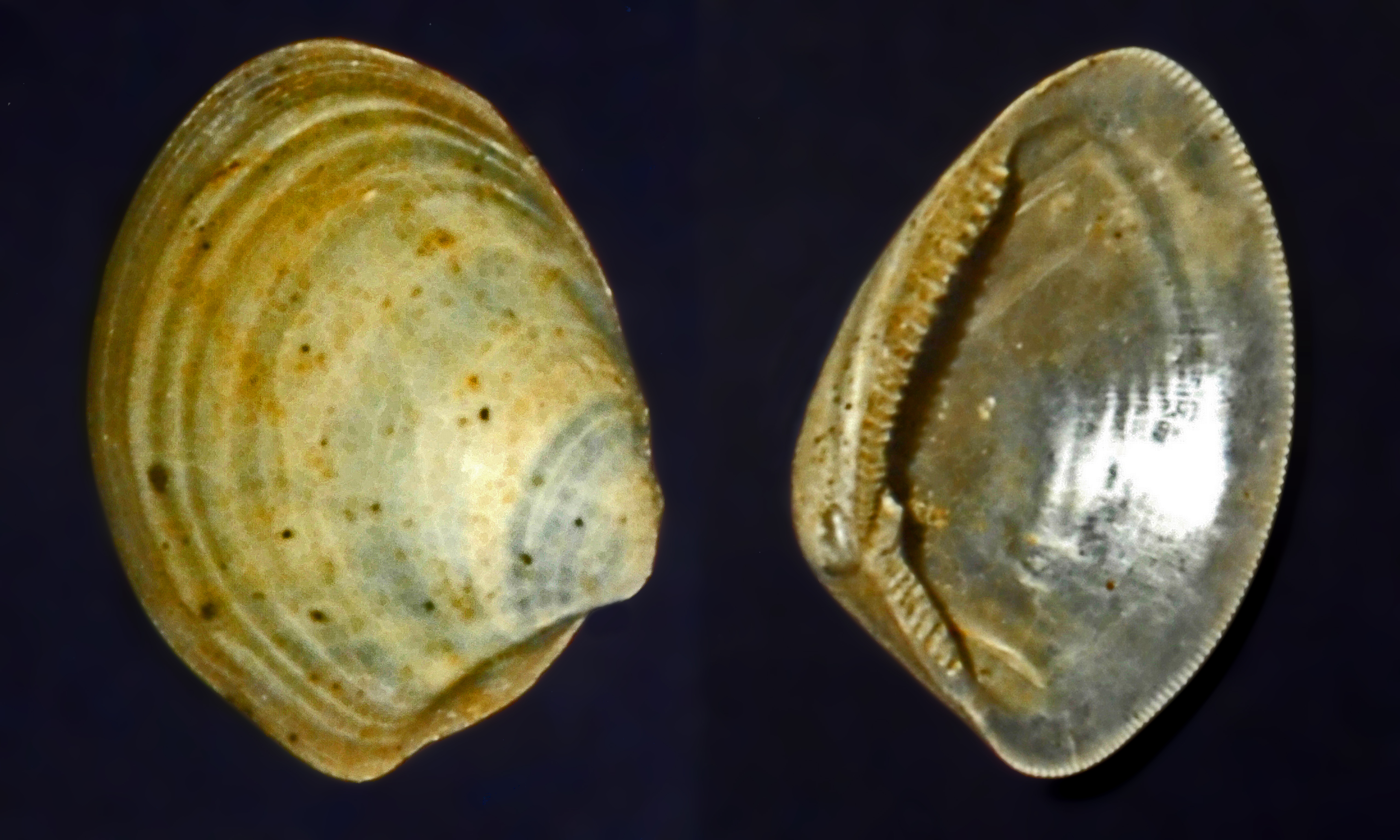
- Interior of a fossilized shell of the Early Ordovician-modern marine bivalve Nucula
  Nucula
  - †Nucula chipolana
  - †Nucula dasa – type locality for species
  - †Nucula defuniak – type locality for species
  - †Nucula gadsdenensis
  - †Nucula proxima
  - †Nucula sinaria
  - †Nucula tampae
  - †Nucula taphria
- Nuculana
  - †Nuculana acuta
  - †Nuculana basilissa – type locality for species
  - †Nuculana chipolana
  - †Nuculana conica
  - †Nuculana diphya – type locality for species
  - †Nuculana dodona
  - †Nuculana hamlinensis
  - †Nuculana leiorhyncha – type locality for species
  - †Nuculana leptalea – type locality for species
  - †Nuculana linifera
  - †Nuculana polychoa – type locality for species
  - †Nuculana polychroa
  - †Nuculana posti
  - †Nuculana proteracuta – type locality for species
  - †Nuculana trochilia
- Numenius
  - †Numenius americanus
- Nummulites
  - †Nummulites floridensis
  - †Nummulites moodysbranchensis
  - †Nummulites ocalanus – or unidentified comparable form
  - †Nummulites ocalina
- Nyctanassa
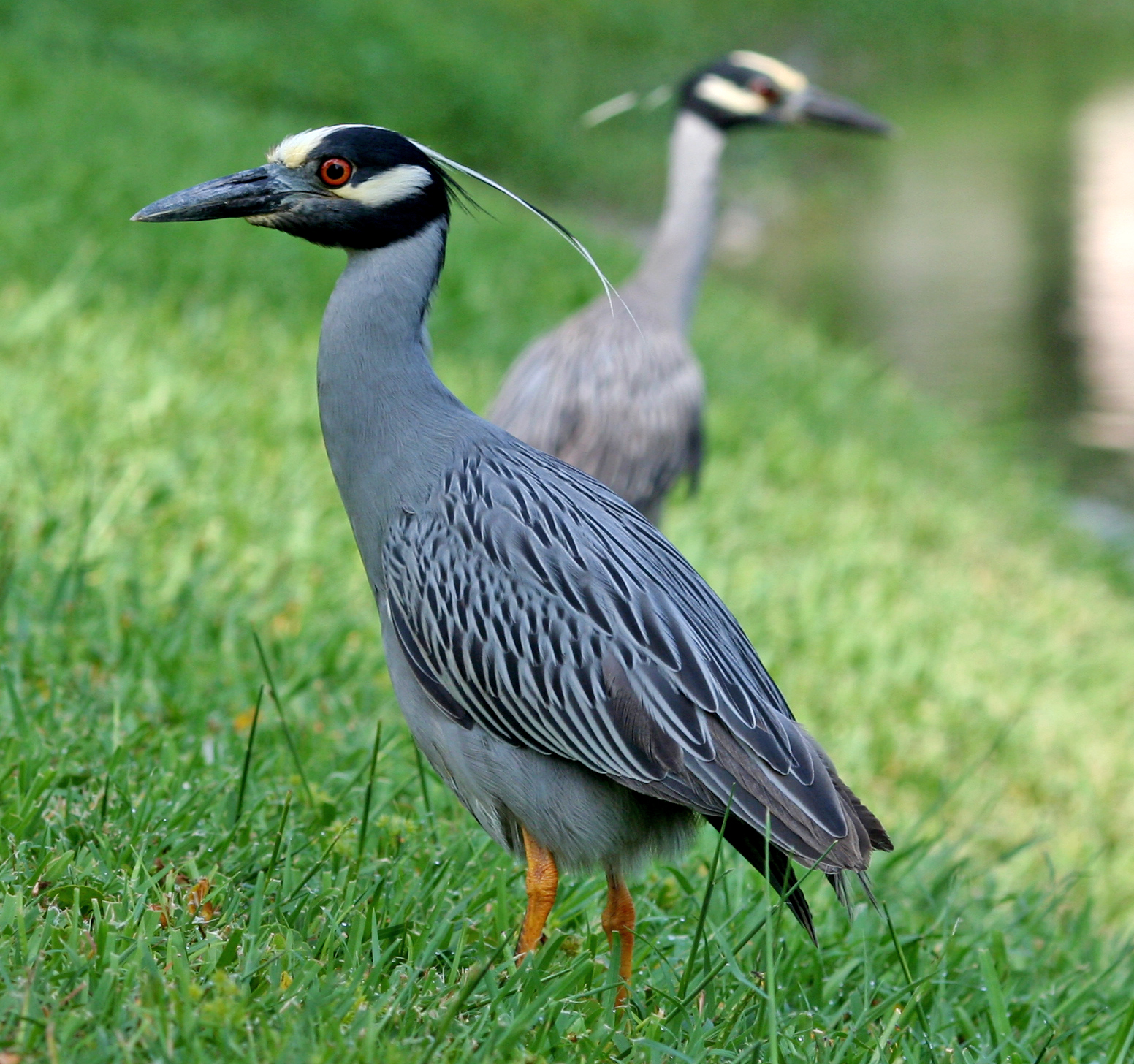
  - A living Nyctanassa violacea, or yellow-crowned night heron
    †Nyctanassa violacea – type locality for species
- Nycticeius
  - †Nycticeius humeralis
- Nycticorax
  - †Nycticorax fidens – type locality for species
  - †Nycticorax nycticorax
- Nyroca
  - †Nyroca affinis
- †Nyssa

== O ==
- †Ocalaster – type locality for genus
  - †Ocalaster seloyi – type locality for species
  - †Ocalaster timucum – type locality for species
- †Ochetosella
  - †Ochetosella jacksonica
- Ochrotomys
  - †Ochrotomys nuttalli
- †Ocukina
  - †Ocukina srasotaensis
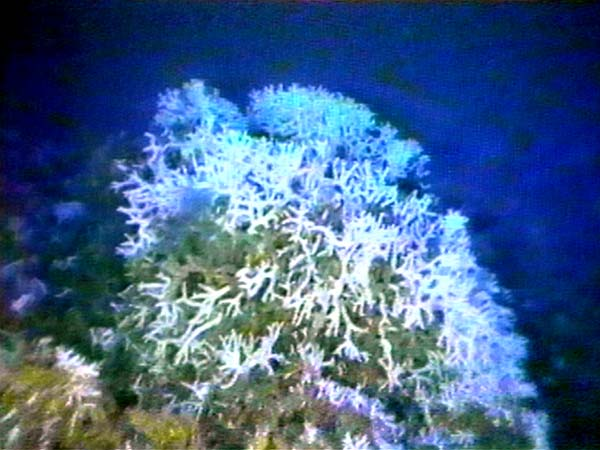
- Living Oculina stony coral
  Oculina
  - †Oculina diffusa
  - †Oculina floridana
  - †Oculina robusta
  - †Oculina sarasotana – type locality for species
- Odocoileus
  - †Odocoileus osceola
  - †Odocoileus sellardsiae – type locality for species
  - †Odocoileus virginianus
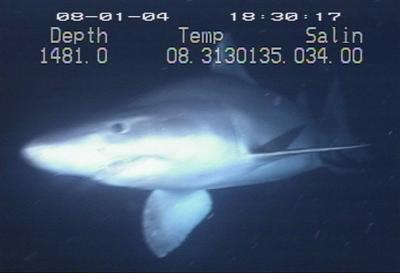
- A living Odontaspis sand shark
  Odontaspis
  - †Odontaspis macrota
- Odostomia
  - †Odostomia acutidens
  - †Odostomia caloosaensis
  - †Odostomia laevigata
- †Ogmophis
  - †Ogmophis pauperrimus – type locality for species
- Olar
  - †Olar buccinator
- †Oligobunis
  - †Oligobunis floridanus – type locality for species
- †Oligopygus
  - †Oligopygus haldemani
  - †Oligopygus phelani
  - †Oligopygus wetherby
  - †Oligopygus wetherbyi
- Oliva
  - †Oliva adami
  - †Oliva alumensis
  - †Oliva blowi
  - †Oliva bollingi
  - †Oliva briani
  - †Oliva brooksvillensis
  - †Oliva carolinae – or unidentified comparable form
  - †Oliva carolinensis
  - †Oliva cokyae
  - †Oliva duerri
  - †Oliva edwardsae
  - †Oliva erici
  - †Oliva eutorta
  - †Oliva gravesae
  - †Oliva immortua
  - †Oliva jenniferae
  - †Oliva keatoni
  - †Oliva lindae
  - †Oliva liodes
  - †Oliva martensii
  - †Oliva murielae
  - †Oliva paraporphyria
  - †Oliva posti
  - †Oliva reticularis
  - †Oliva roseae
  - †Oliva rucksorum
  - †Oliva ryani
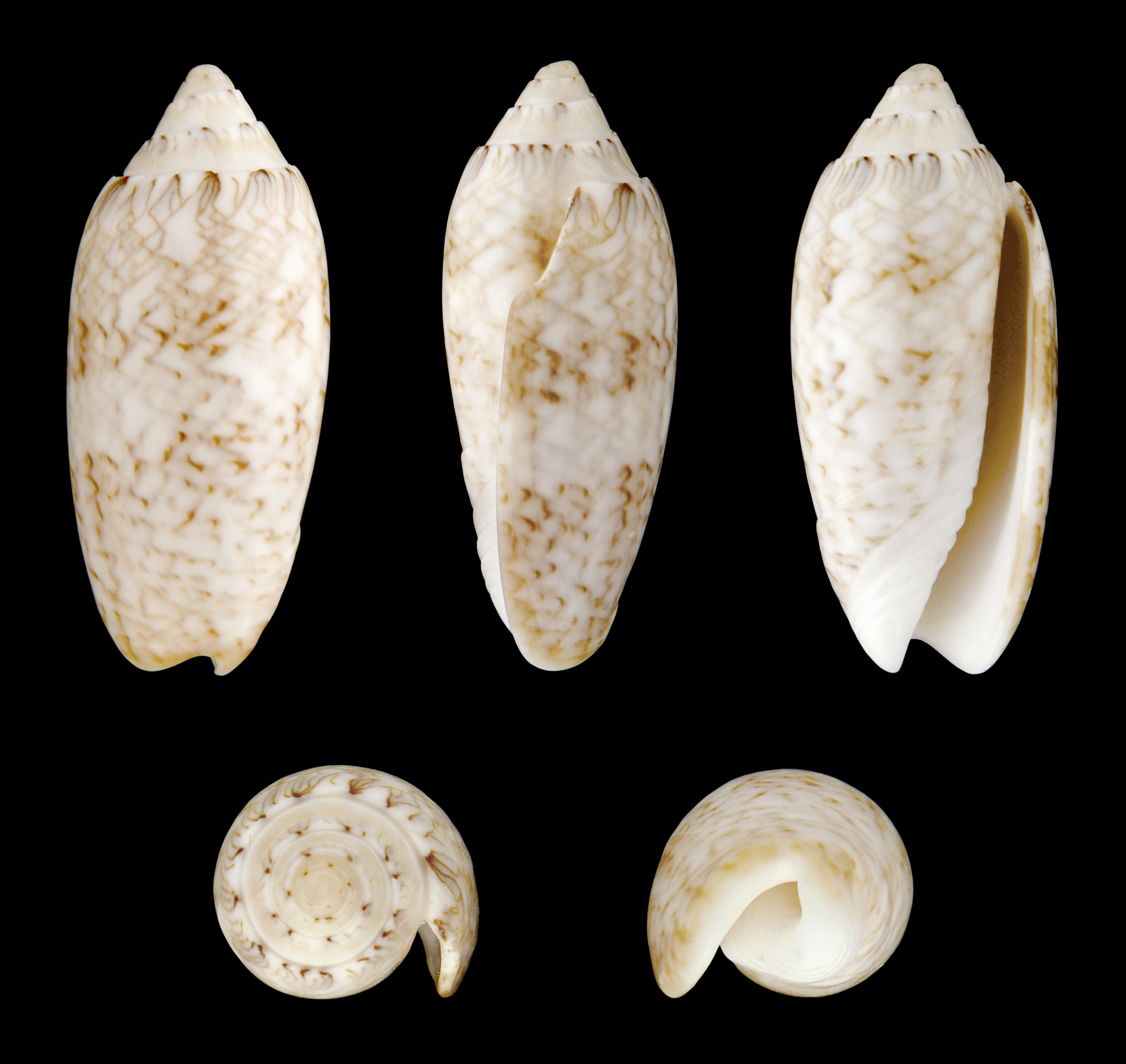
  - Shell in multiple views of an Oliva sayana, or lettered olive sea snail
    †Oliva sayana
  - †Oliva smithorum
  - †Oliva southbayensis
  - †Oliva vokesorum – type locality for species
  - †Oliva waltoniana – type locality for species
  - †Oliva wendyae
- Olivella
  - †Olivella clewistonensis
  - †Olivella cotinados – type locality for species
  - †Olivella dasa – type locality for species
  - †Olivella dealbata
  - †Olivella dodona
  - †Olivella eleutheria – type locality for species
  - †Olivella eleuthria
  - †Olivella eutacta
  - †Olivella fargoi
  - †Olivella floralia
  - †Olivella floridana
  - †Olivella gladeensis
  - †Olivella jacksonensis
  - †Olivella lata
  - †Olivella liveoakensis
  - †Olivella mississippiensis – or unidentified related form
  - †Olivella mutica
  - †Olivella oryzoides – type locality for species
  - †Olivella perfloralia
  - †Olivella poinciana – type locality for species
  - †Olivella pugilis
  - †Olivella pusilla
  - †Olivella tamiamiensis
  - †Olivella vicksburgensis
- †Olssonella
- †Omanidacna – tentative report
  - †Omanidacna gunteri
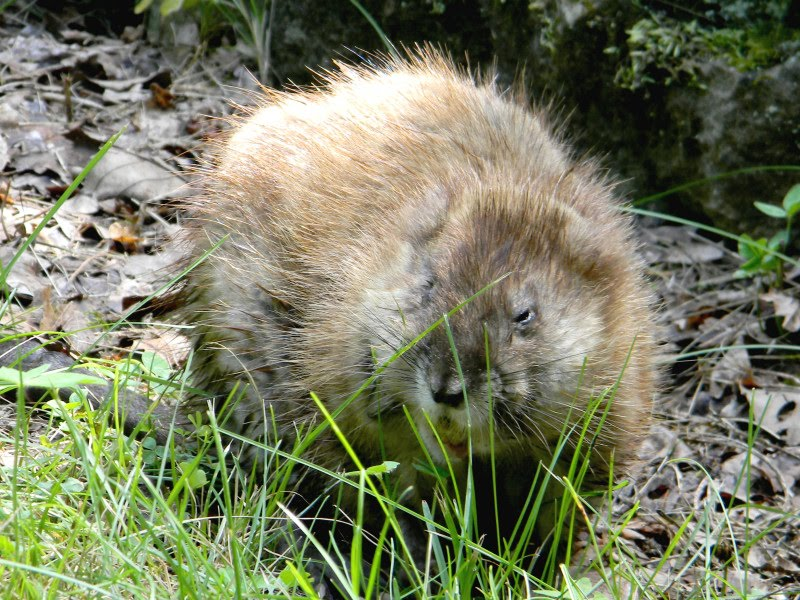
- A living Ondatra, or muskrat
  Ondatra
  - †Ondatra annectens
  - †Ondatra idahoensis
  - †Ondatra zibethicus
- Onoba
  - †Onoba litiopaopsis – type locality for species
- †Ontocetus
  - †Ontocetus emmonsi
- Onustus
  - †Onustus grayi – type locality for species
- Opalia
  - †Opalia deboury
  - †Opalia debouryi
- Opheodrys
  - †Opheodrys aestivus
- Ophidion
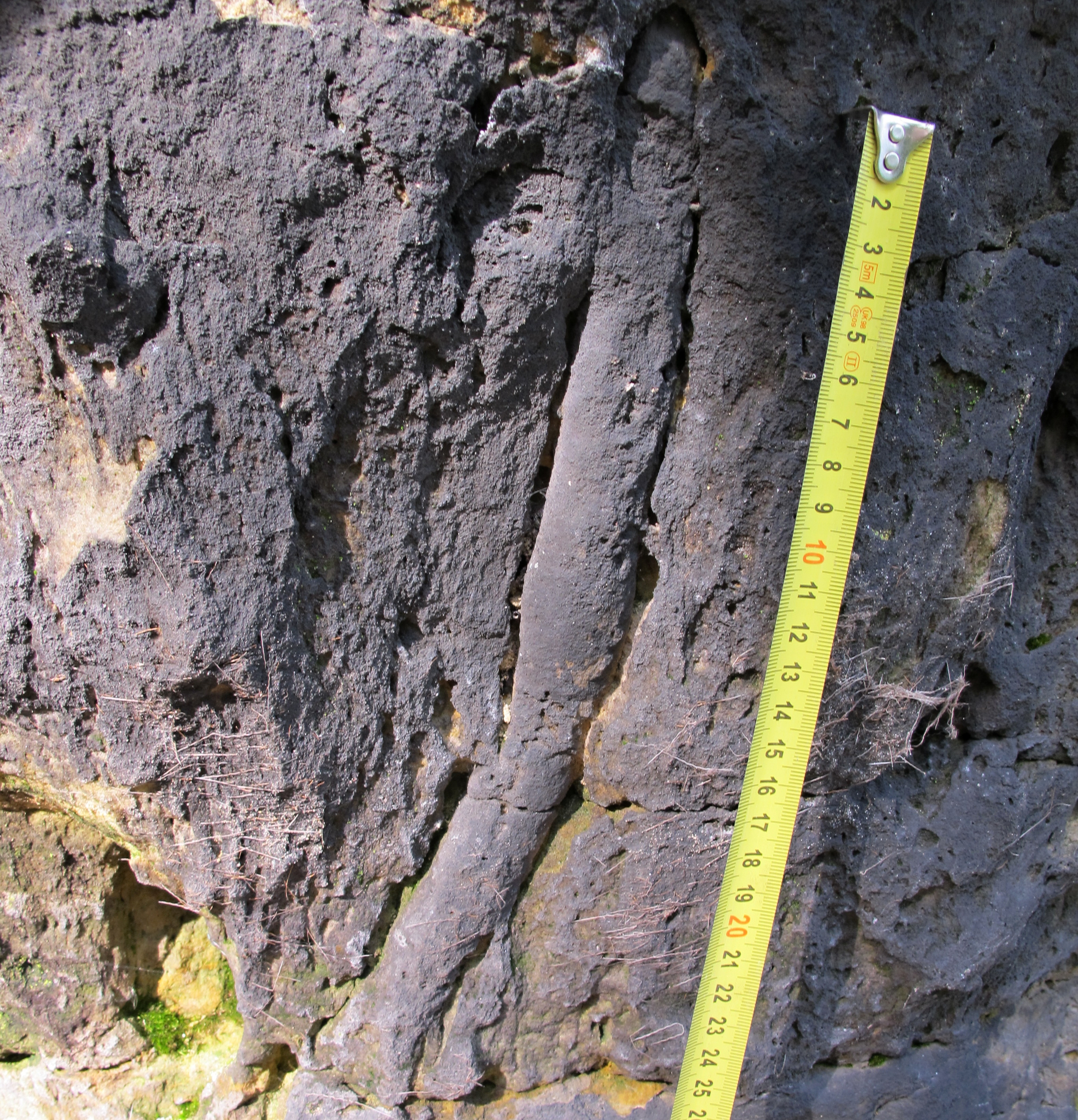
- Fossil of the Permian-modern crustacean burrow ichnogenus Ophiomorpha
  †Ophiomorpha
- Ophisaurus
  - †Ophisaurus compressus
  - †Ophisaurus ventralis
- †Opisthomena
  - †Opisthomena oglimum
- †Opsanus
- Orbicella
  - †Orbicella annularis
- †Orbitoides
- Orbulina
  - †Orbulina universa
- Orionina
  - †Orionina bermudae
- †Orthaulax
  - †Orthaulax gabbi
  - †Orthaulax hernandoensis
  - †Orthaulax inornatus
  - †Orthaulax pugnax
- Orthogeomys
  - †Orthogeomys propinetis
- Orthopristis
  - †Orthopristis chrysopterus
- Oryzomys
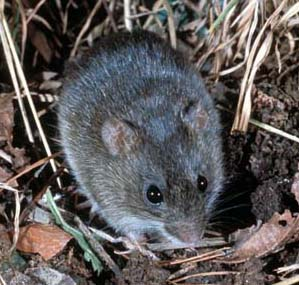
  - A living Oryzomys palustris, or marsh rice rat
    †Oryzomys palustris
- †Osbornodon
  - †Osbornodon iamonensis
  - †Osbornodon wangi – type locality for species
- †Oscilla
  - †Oscilla biseriata
- Osthimosia
  - †Osthimosia glomerata
- Ostrea
  - †Ostrea brucei
  - †Ostrea compressirostra
  - †Ostrea coxi
  - †Ostrea densata – or unidentified comparable form
  - †Ostrea disparilis
  - †Ostrea equestris
  - †Ostrea falco
  - †Ostrea geraldjohnsoni
  - †Ostrea locklini
  - †Ostrea meridionalis
  - †Ostrea meridonalis
  - †Ostrea normalis
  - †Ostrea pauciplicata
  - †Ostrea podagrina
  - †Ostrea scuplturata
  - †Ostrea subdigitalina
  - †Ostrea vaughani
- †Otodus
  - Diagram illustrating the largest (grey) and most conservative (red) size estimates of the Miocene-Pliocene shark Carcharocles megalodon (sometimes Carcharodon or Otodus megalodon) with a whale shark (violet), great white shark (green), and anachronistic human (black) to scale
    †Otodus megalodon
- Otus
  - †Otus asio
- †Oxydactylus – tentative report
- †Oxyura
  - †Oxyura hulberti – type locality for species
  - †Oxyura jamaicensis
- †Oyenaster – type locality for genus
  - †Oyenaster oblidus – type locality for species

== P ==
- †Pachyarmatherium
  - †Pachyarmatherium leiseyi – type locality for species
- †Pachycrommium
  - †Pachycrommium brucei – type locality for species
  - †Pachycrommium burnsii
  - †Pachycrommium dalli
  - †Pachycrommium dodonum – type locality for species
  - †Pachycrommium floridana
  - †Pachycrommium guppyi
  - †Pachycrommium mansfieldi
  - †Pachycrommium occiduum – type locality for species
- †Pahayokea
  - †Pahayokea alligator
  - †Pahayokea aspenae
  - †Pahayokea basingerensis
  - †Pahayokea erici
  - †Pahayokea gabrielleae
  - †Pahayokea josiai
  - †Pahayokea kissimmeensis
  - †Pahayokea mansfieldi
  - †Pahayokea parodizi
  - †Pahayokea penningtonorum
  - †Pahayokea rucksorum
- †Palaeogale
  - †Palaeogale minuta
- †Palaeolama
  - †Palaeolama mirifica – type locality for species
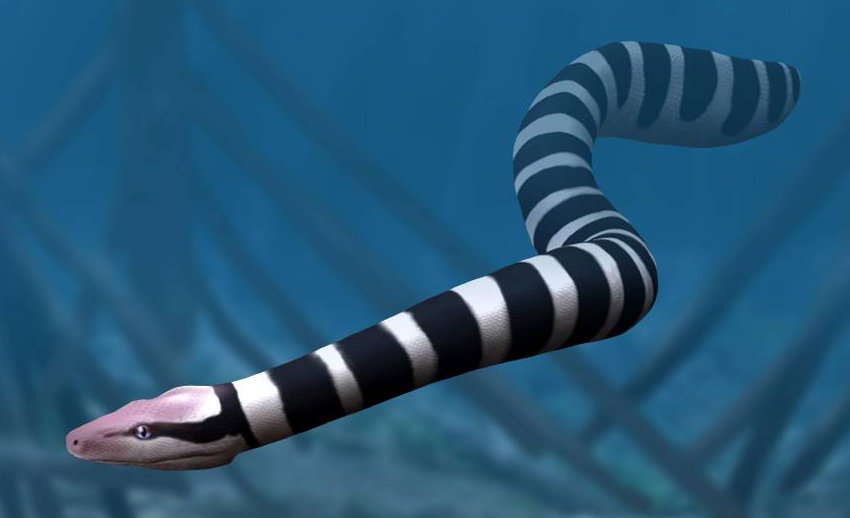
- Restoration of the Cretaceous-Eocene sea snake Palaeophis
  †Palaeophis
- †Palaeophoyx – type locality for genus
  - †Palaeophoyx columbiana – type locality for species
- †Palaeostruthus
  - †Palaeostruthus eurius – type locality for species
- Pallacera
  - †Pallacera caseyi
  - †Pallacera chipolanus
  - †Pallacera costatus
  - †Pallacera tribakus – type locality for species
  - †Pallacera vicksburgensis
- †Pandanaris
  - †Pandanaris convexa
- Pandion
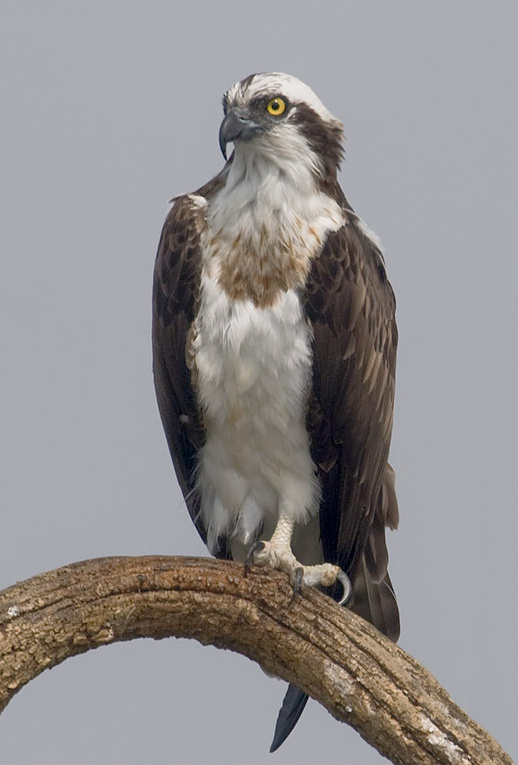
  - A living Pandion haliaetus, or osprey
    †Pandion haliaetus
  - †Pandion lovensis – type locality for species
- Pandora
  - †Pandora arenosa
  - †Pandora bushiana
  - †Pandora dodona
  - †Pandora trilineata
  - †Pandora tuomeyi
- Panopea
  - †Panopea bitruncata
  - †Panopea brooksvillensis
  - †Panopea floridana
  - †Panopea goldfussi
  - †Panopea goldfussil
  - †Panopea parawhitfieldi – type locality for species
  - †Panopea reflexa
- Panthera
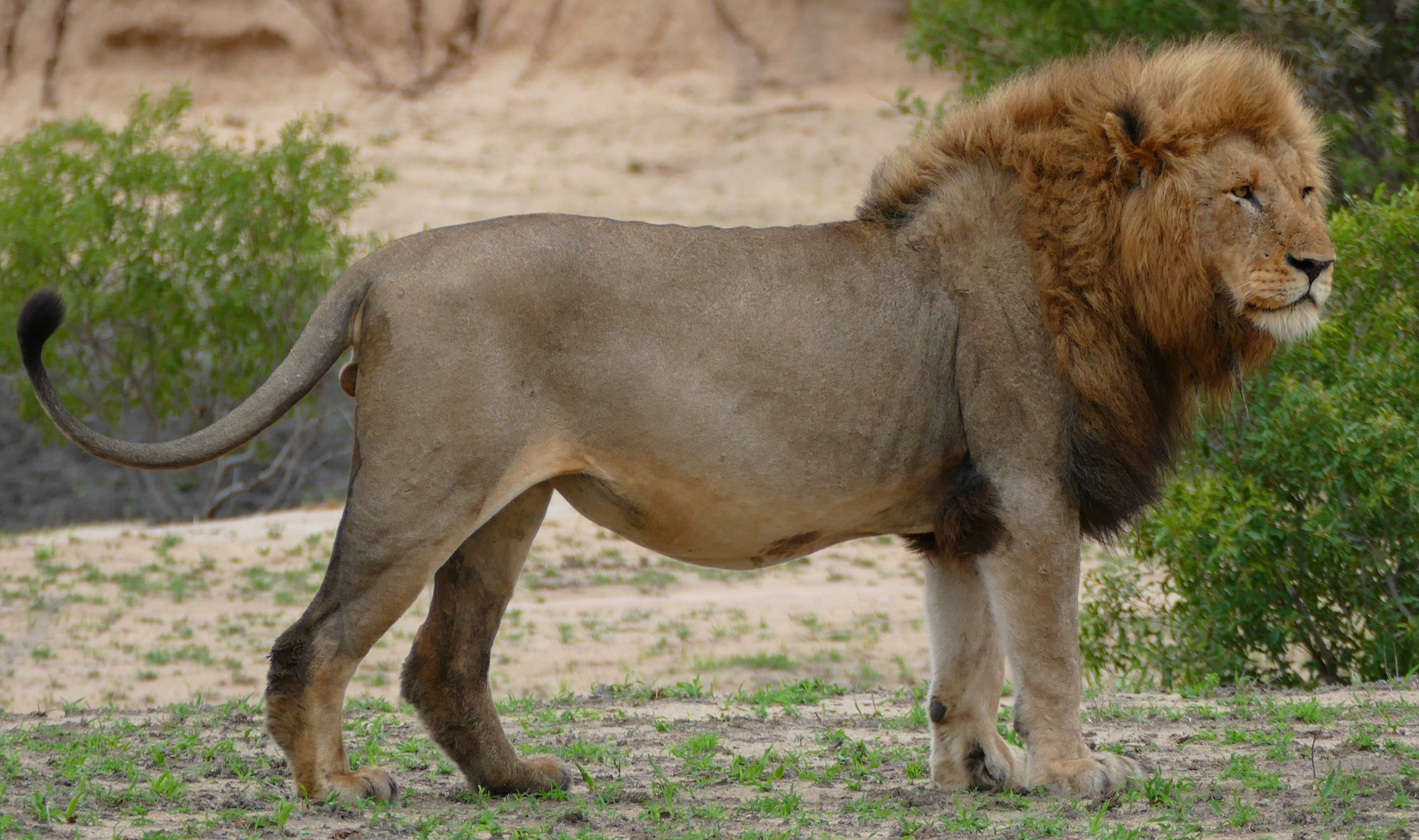
  - A living Panthera leo, or lion
    †Panthera leo
  - †Panthera onca
- †Papillina
  - †Papillina gunteri – type locality for species
- Papyridea
  - †Papyridea bulbosum
  - †Papyridea semisulcata
  - †Papyridea soleniformis
- †Parablastomeryx
  - †Parablastomeryx floridanus – type locality for species
  - †Parablastomeryx gregorii
- †Parabornia
  - †Parabornia squillina
- Paraconcavus
  - †Paraconcavus talquinensis
- Paracyathus
  - †Paracyathus vaughani
- Paradentalium
  - †Paradentalium disparile
- †Parahippus
  - †Parahippus leonensis – type locality for species
- †Paramerychyus
  - †Paramerychyus harrisonensis
- Parametaria
  - †Parametaria hertweckorum
  - †Parametaria lindae
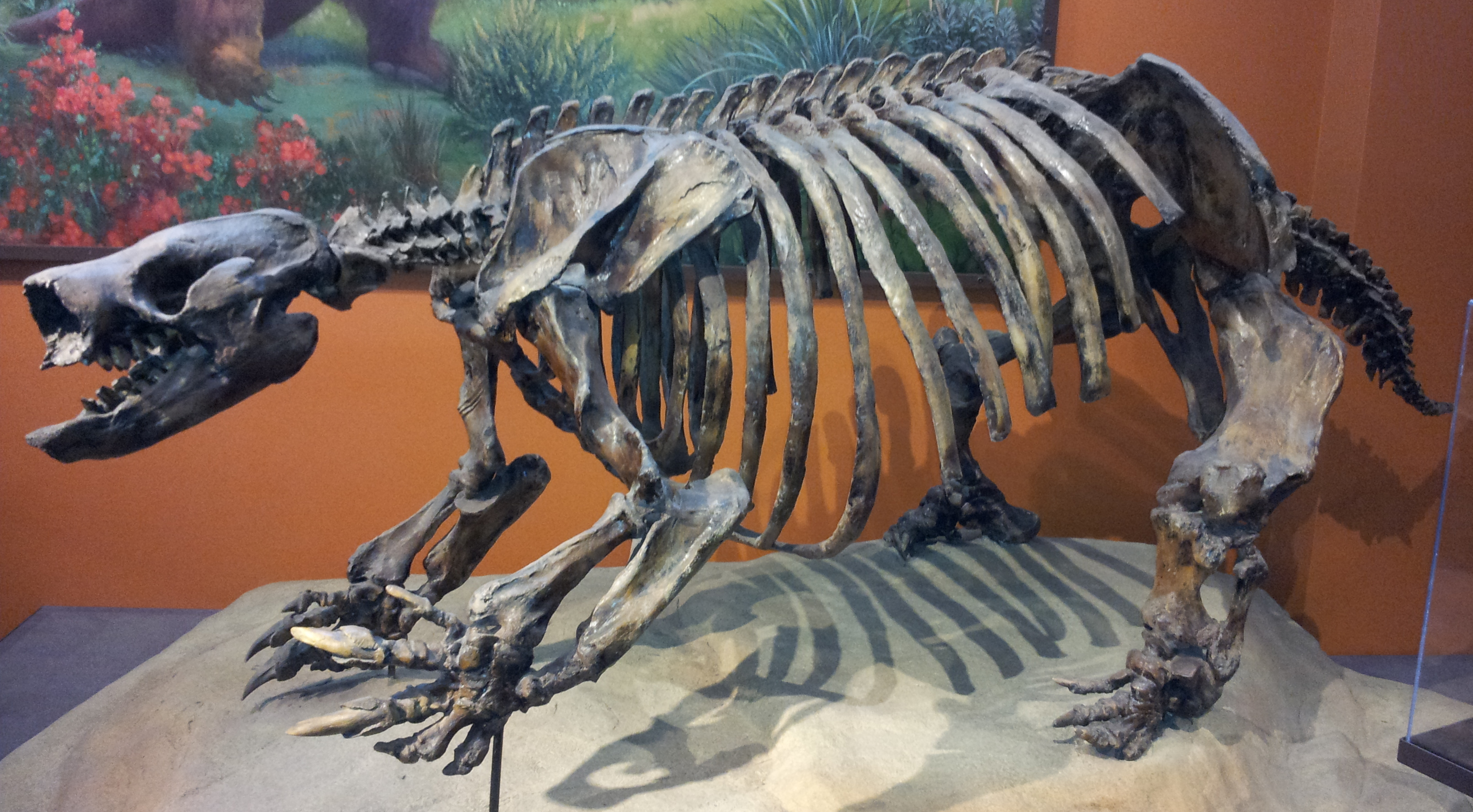
- Fossilized skeleton of the Pliocene-Pleistocene ground sloth Paramylodon
  †Paramylodon
  - †Paramylodon harlani
- †Paranasua
  - †Paranasua biradica – type locality for species
- †Paraoxybelis – type locality for genus
  - †Paraoxybelis floridanus – type locality for species
- †Parasatarte
  - †Parasatarte triquetra
- Parastarte
  - †Parastarte chipolana – type locality for species
  - †Parastarte triquetra
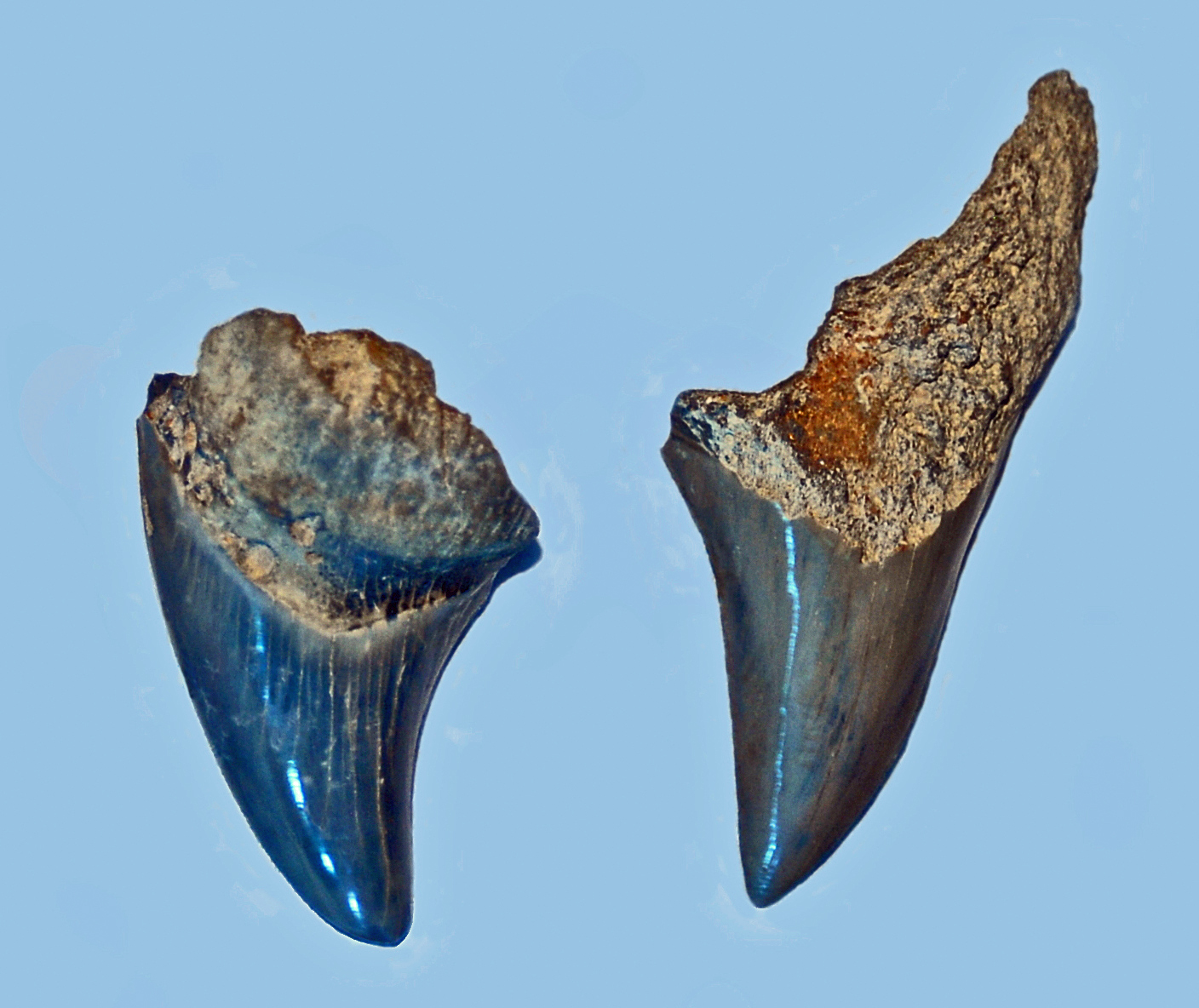
- Fossilized teeth of the Eocene-Pleistocene shark Parotodus, or the false-toothed mako
  †Parotodus
  - †Parotodus benedeni
- Parvanachis
  - †Parvanachis obesa
- †Parvericius
  - †Parvericius montanus
- Parvilucina
  - †Parvilucina costata
  - †Parvilucina crenella
  - †Parvilucina crenulata
  - †Parvilucina diktyota
  - †Parvilucina flumenvadosa – type locality for species
  - †Parvilucina multilineatus
  - †Parvilucina multistriata
  - †Parvilucina piluliformis
  - †Parvilucina sphaeriolus
  - †Parvilucina vaughani – type locality for species
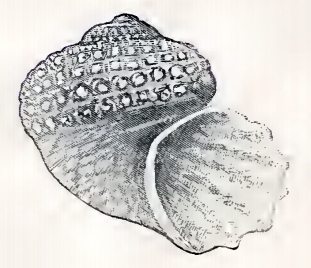
- Illustration of the shell of a Parviturbo
  Parviturbo
  - †Parviturbo milium
- Parviturboides
  - †Parviturboides avitus
- Passerculus
  - †Passerculus sandwichensis
- Passerella – or unidentified comparable form
- †Passerherbulus
  - †Passerherbulus henslowii
- Passerina – or unidentified comparable form
- Patelloida
  - †Patelloida pustulata
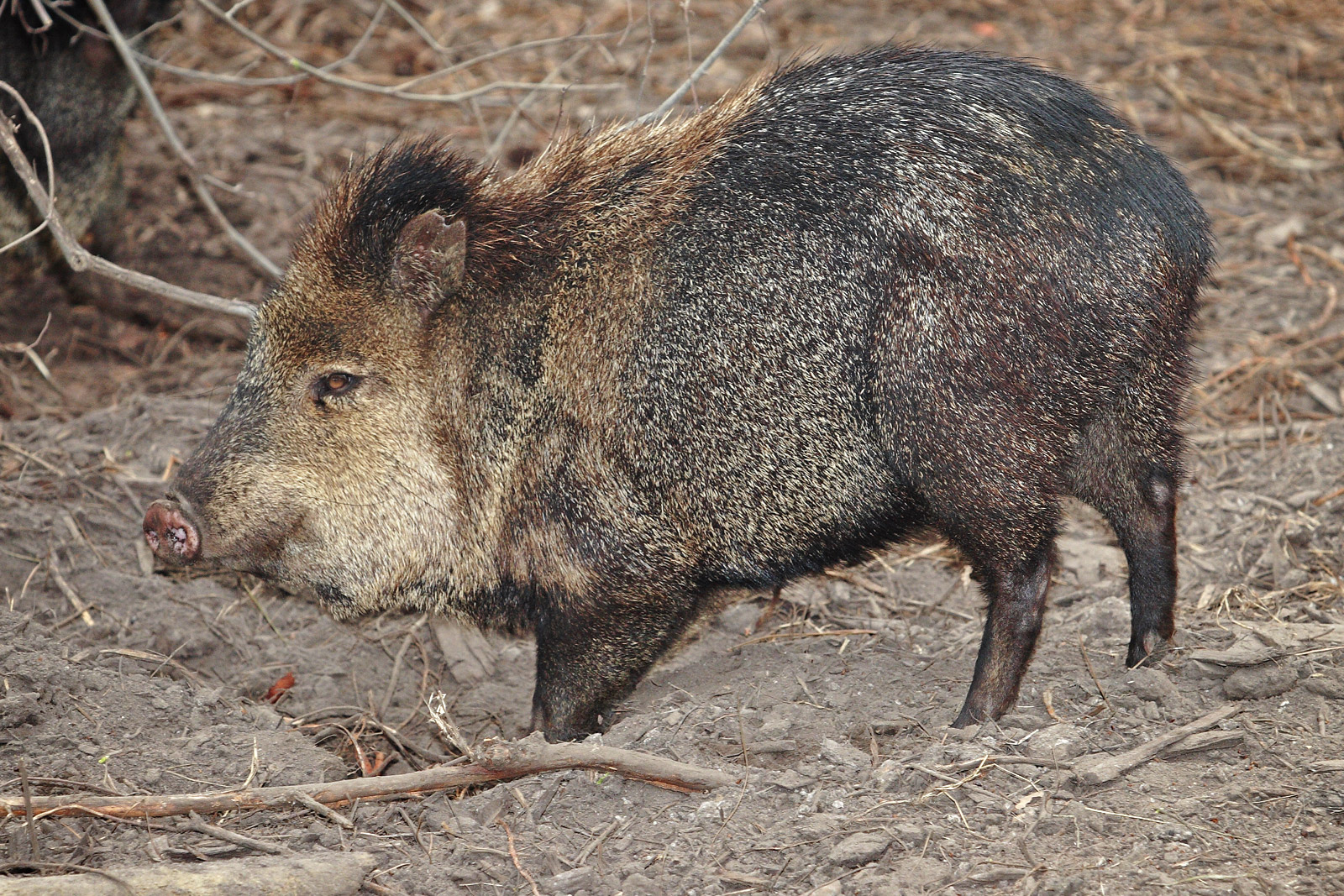
- A living Pecari
  Pecari
- Pecten
  - †Pecten burnsi
  - †Pecten burnsii
  - †Pecten hemycyclicus
  - †Pecten humphreysii
  - †Pecten leonensis
  - †Pecten ochlockoneensis
  - †Pecten perplanus
  - †Pecten poulsoni
  - †Pecten wendelli
- †Pedalion
  - †Pedalion kecia
  - †Pedalion solereperta
- †Pediomeryx
  - †Pediomeryx hemphillensis
- Pelecanus
  - †Pelecanus erythrorhynchos – or unidentified comparable form
  - †Pelecanus schreiberi
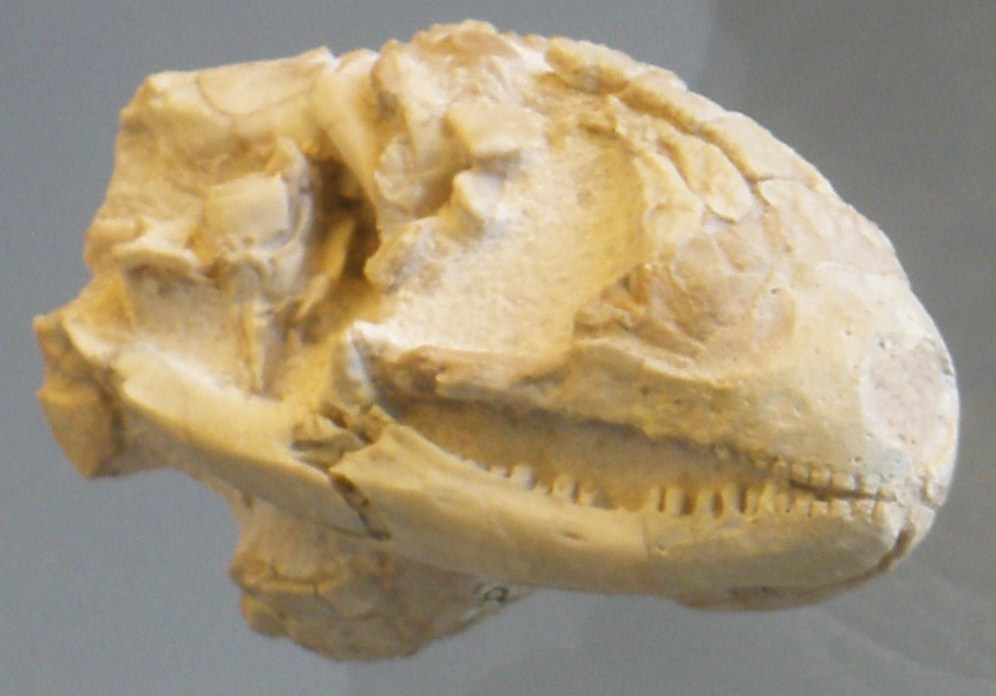
- Fossilized skull of the Eocene-Oligocene lizard Peltosaurus
  †Peltosaurus
  - †Peltosaurus floridanus – type locality for species
- Peneroplis
- †Periarchus
  - †Periarchus floridans
  - †Periarchus floridanus
  - †Periarchus floridianus
  - †Periarchus lyelli
- Perigastrella
  - †Perigastrella depressa
  - †Perigastrella ovoidea
  - †Perigastrella tubulosa
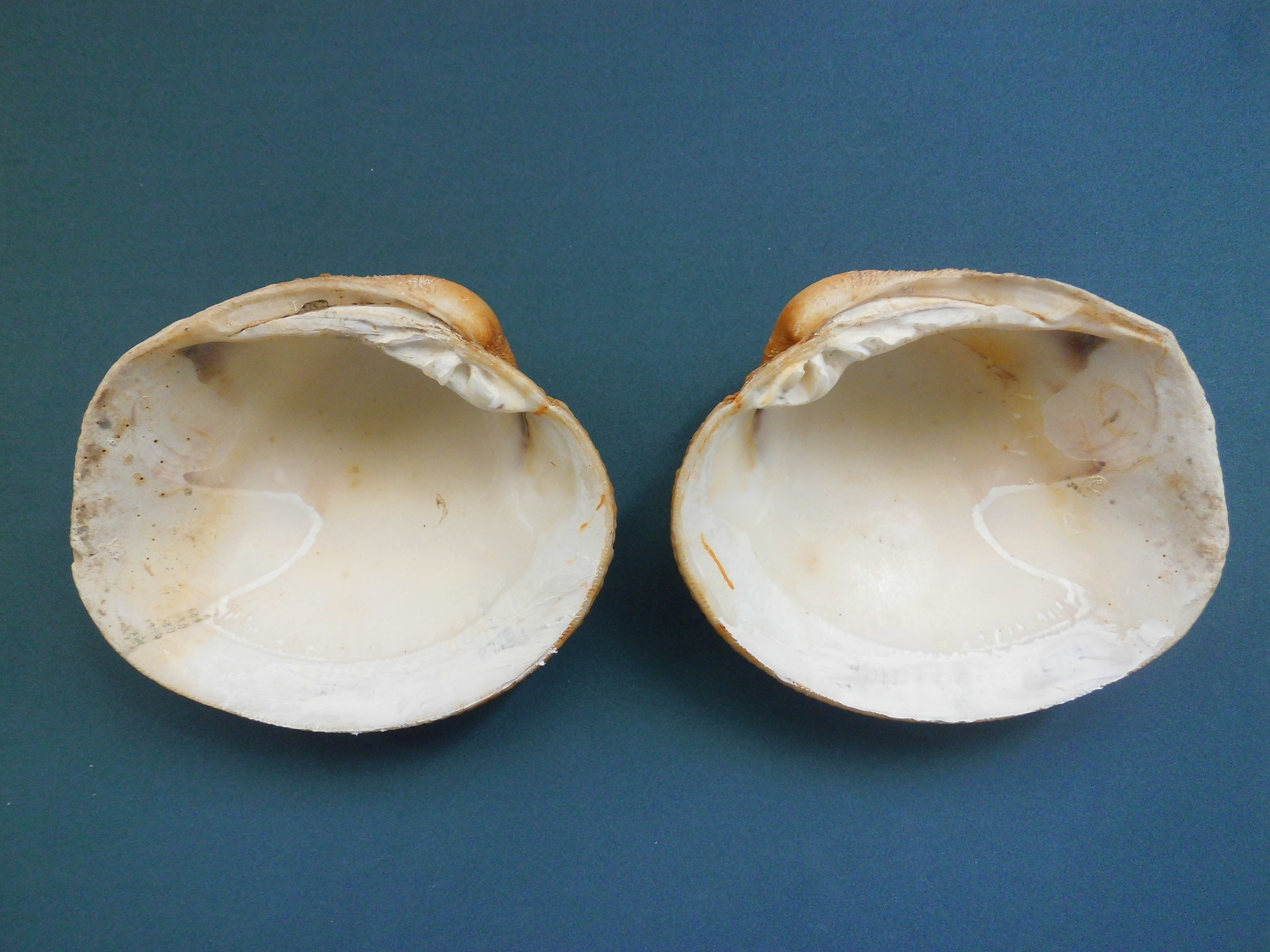
- Interior of the shell of a Periglypta venus clam
  Periglypta
  - †Periglypta caesarina
  - †Periglypta tarquinia
- Periploma
  - †Periploma discus – type locality for species
- Peristernia
  - †Peristernia filicata
- Perna
  - †Perna conradi
  - †Perna conradiana
  - †Perna incurvus
- Perognathus
  - †Perognathus minutus – or unidentified comparable form
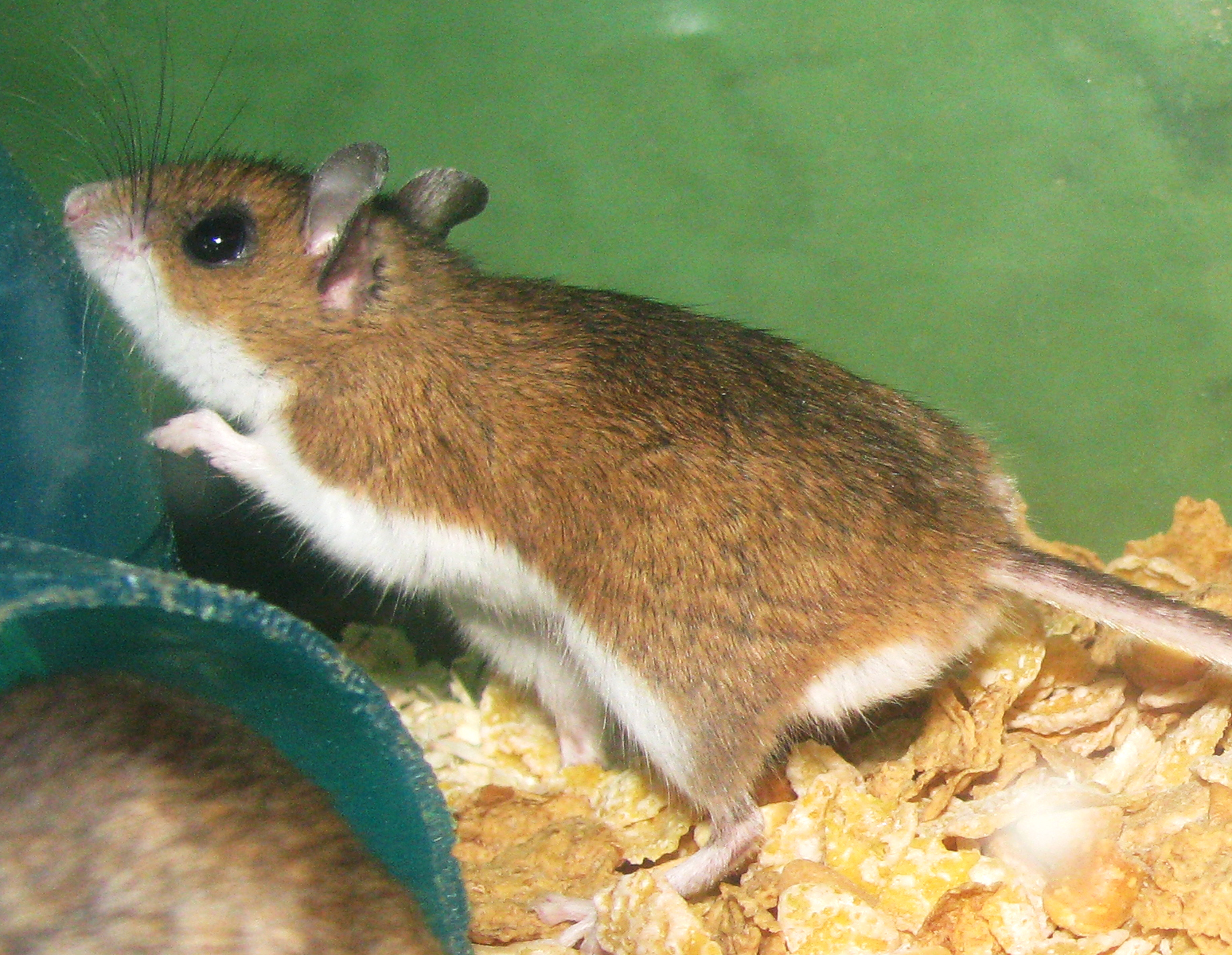
- The appearance of a Podomys floridanus, or Florida mouse, is similar to the Peromyscus shown in this illustration
  Peromyscus
  - †Peromyscus gossypinus
  - †Peromyscus hagermanensis
  - †Peromyscus polionotus
  - †Peromyscus sarmocophinus – type locality for species
- Peronella
  - †Peronella archerensis
  - †Peronella crustuloides
  - †Peronella cubae
  - †Peronella dalli
- †Perplicaria
  - †Perplicaria perplexa
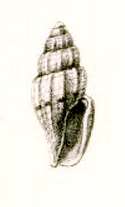
- Illustration of the shell of a Persicula sea snail
  Persicula
  - †Persicula amplior – type locality for species
  - †Persicula calhounensis
  - †Persicula dockeryi
  - †Persicula macneili
  - †Persicula ovula
  - †Persicula suwanneensis
- Persististrombus
  - †Persististrombus aldrichi
  - †Persististrombus chipolanus
- Petaloconchus
  - †Petaloconchus floridanus
  - †Petaloconchus graniferus
  - †Petaloconchus sculpturatus
  - †Petaloconchus varians
- †Petauristodon
  - †Petauristodon pattersoni
- Petricola
  - †Petricola concoralla
  - †Petricola hoerleae – type locality for species
  - †Petricola lapicida
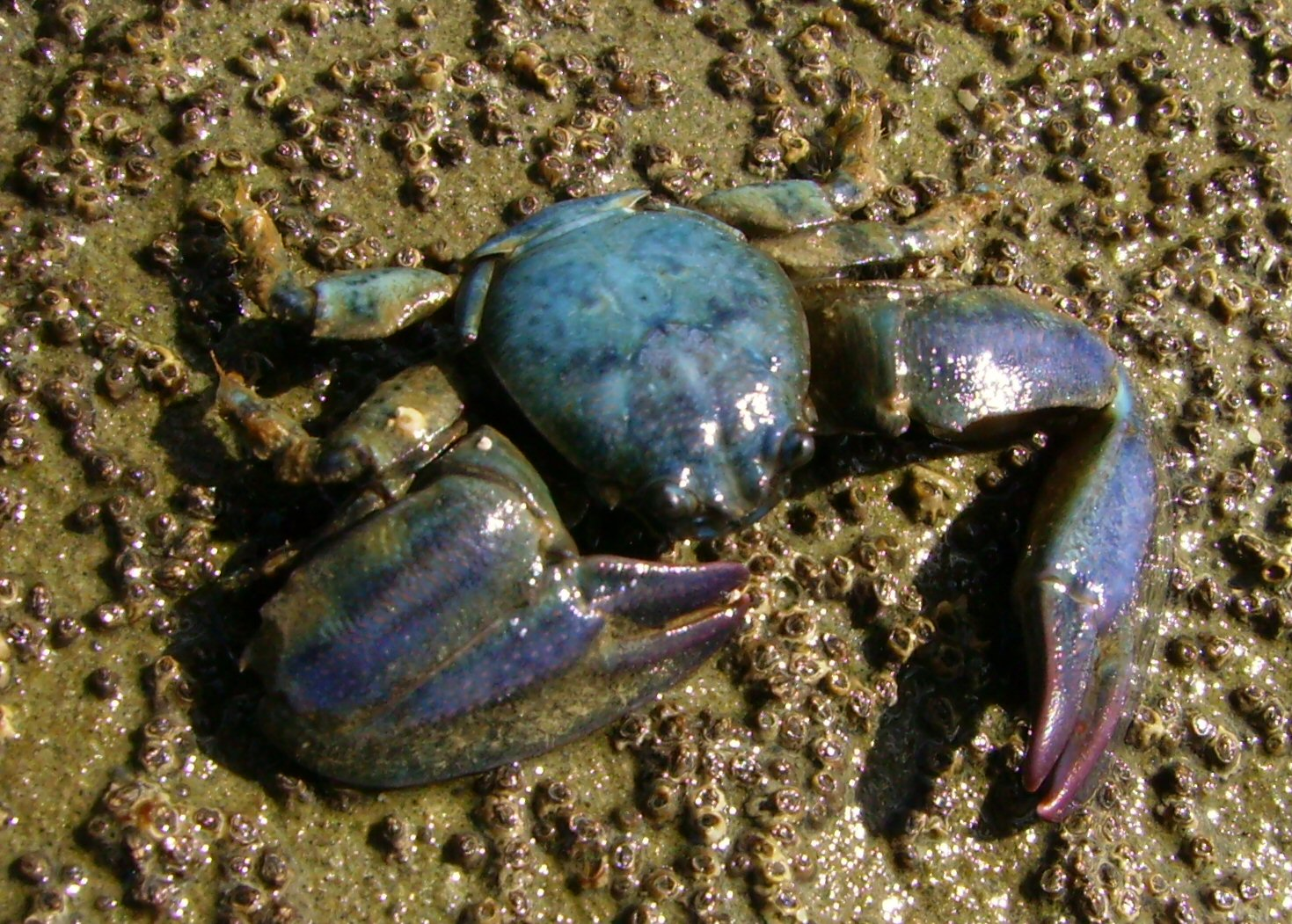
- A living Petrolisthes porcelain crab
  †Petrolisthes
  - †Petrolisthes myakkensis – type locality for species
- Petrophyllia
  - †Petrophyllia limonensis
- Phacoides
  - †Phacoides amabilis
  - †Phacoides calhounensis
  - †Phacoides chrysostoma
  - †Phacoides disciformis
  - †Phacoides eupheus – type locality for species
  - †Phacoides flumenvadosa
  - †Phacoides hernandoensis
  - †Phacoides hillsboroensis – tentative report
  - †Phacoides hillsboroughensis – tentative report
  - †Phacoides nasuta – or unidentified related form
  - †Phacoides nereididetus
  - †Phacoides parawhitfieldi
  - †Phacoides pectinata
  - †Phacoides pectinatus – or unidentified comparable form
  - †Phacoides sphaeriolus
  - †Phacoides tampaensis
  - †Phacoides tuomeyi
  - †Phacoides wacissanus
- Phalacrocorax
  - †Phalacrocorax auritus
  - †Phalacrocorax filyawi – type locality for species
  - †Phalacrocorax idahensis
  - †Phalacrocorax wetmorei – type locality for species
  - †Phalacrocorax wvetmorei – or unidentified comparable form
- Phalium
  - †Phalium caelatura
  - †Phalium globosum
  - †Phalium inflatum
  - †Phalium murryi
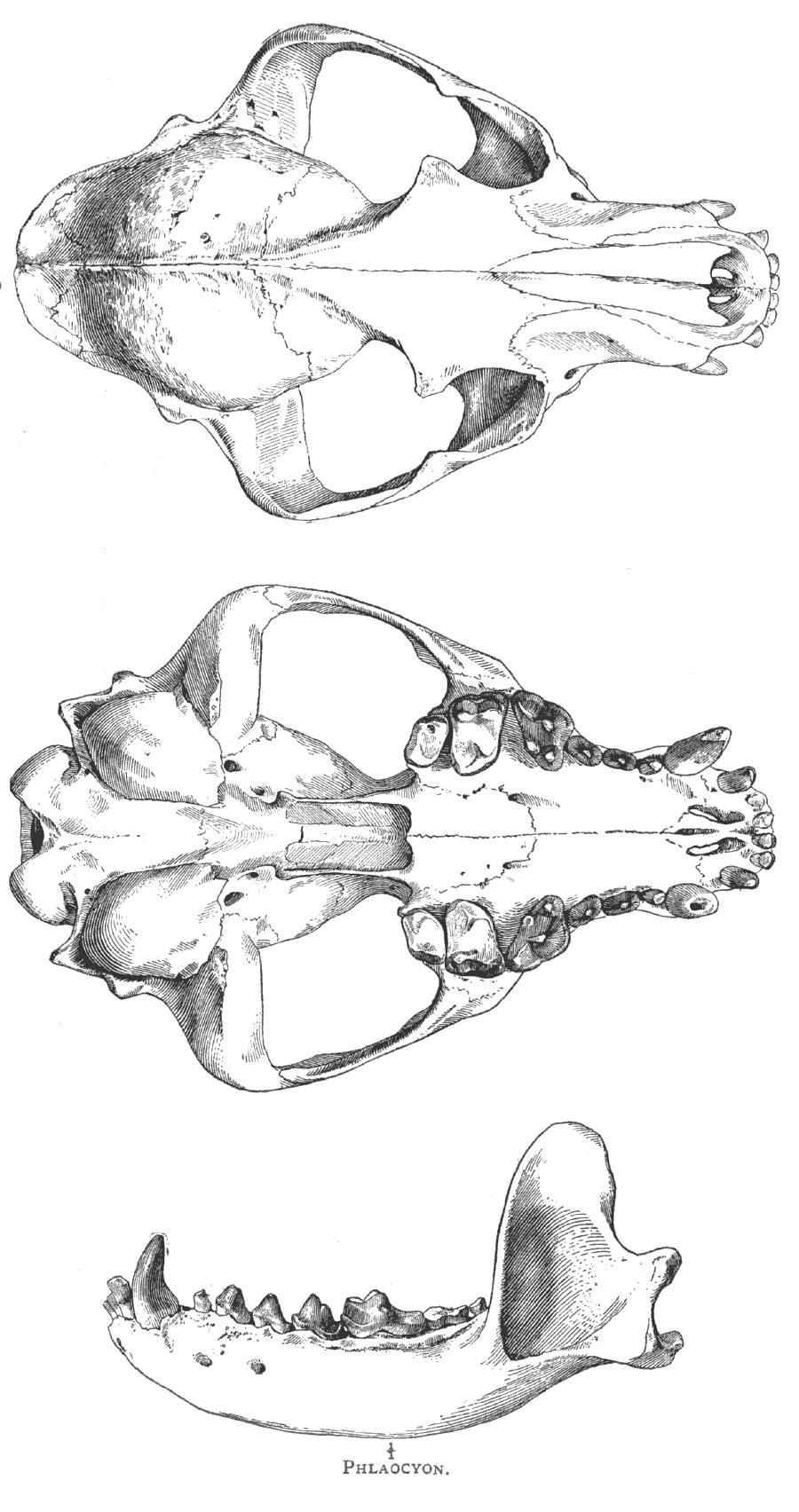
- Illustration of a fossilized skull in multiple views of the Oligocene-Miocene bone-crushing dog Phlaocyon
  †Phlaocyon
  - †Phlaocyon achoros
  - †Phlaocyon leucosteus
  - †Phlaocyon taylori – type locality for species
- †Phoberocyon
  - †Phoberocyon johnhenryi
- †Phocanella
  - †Phocanella pumila
- Phoenicopterus
  - †Phoenicopterus copei
  - †Phoenicopterus floridanus
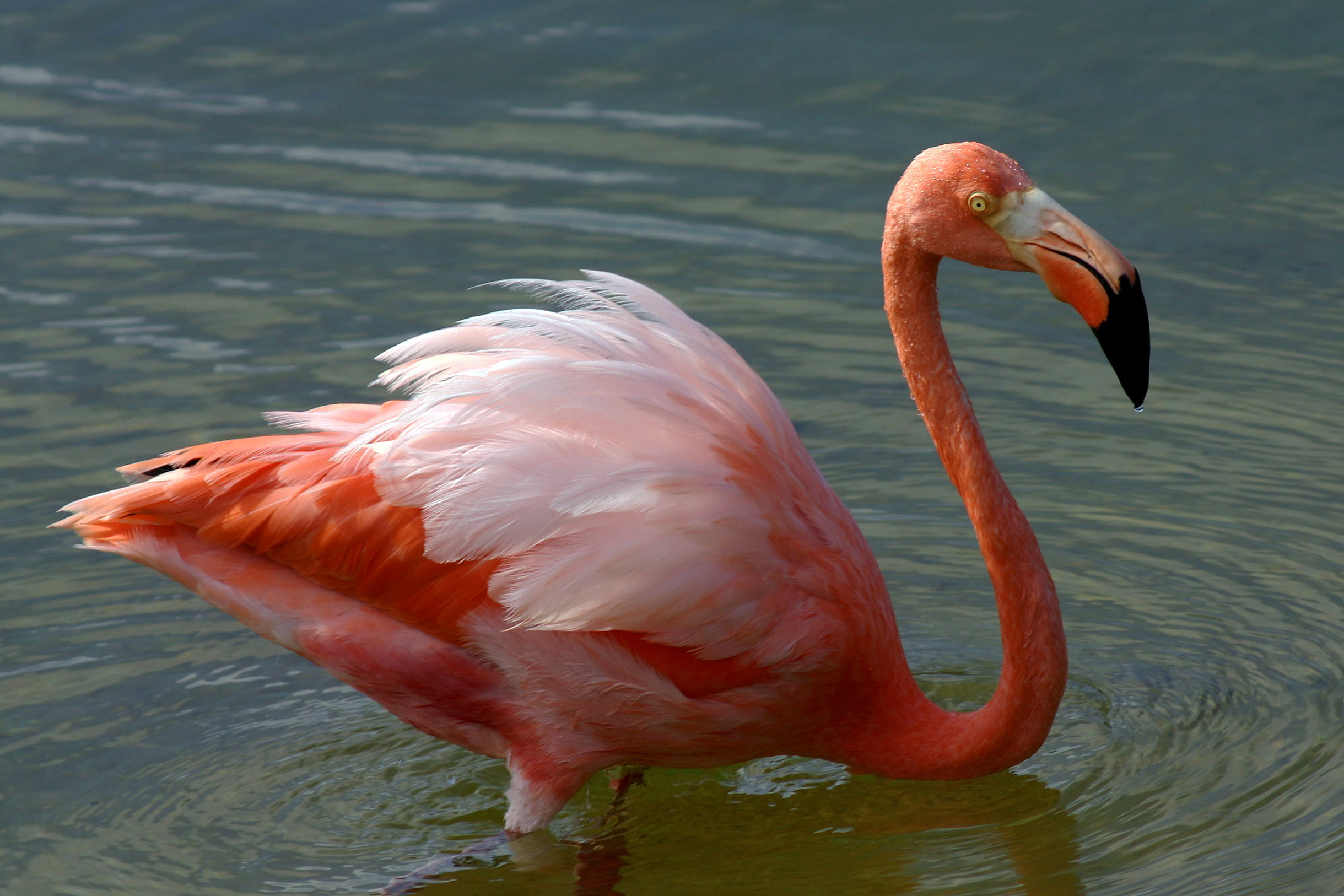
  - A living Phoenicopterus ruber, or American flamingo
    †Phoenicopterus ruber
- Pholadomya
- Phos
  - †Phos parrishi – type locality for species
  - †Phos sloani
  - †Phos ursula
  - †Phos vadosus
- Phrontis
  - †Phrontis vibex
- †Phugatherium
  - †Phugatherium dichroplax
- Phylactella
  - †Phylactella parvicollum
- Phyllacanthus
  - †Phyllacanthus mortoni
- †Phyllangia
  - †Phyllangia americana
  - †Phyllangia blakei – type locality for species
- Phyllonotus
  - †Phyllonotus evergladesensis
  - †Phyllonotus globosus
  - †Phyllonotus labelleensis
  - †Phyllonotus leonensis
  - †Phyllonotus martinshugari
  - †Phyllonotus pomum
  - †Phyllonotus tritonopsis
  - †Phyllonotus trophoniformis
- †Phymotaxis
  - †Phymotaxis mansfieldi
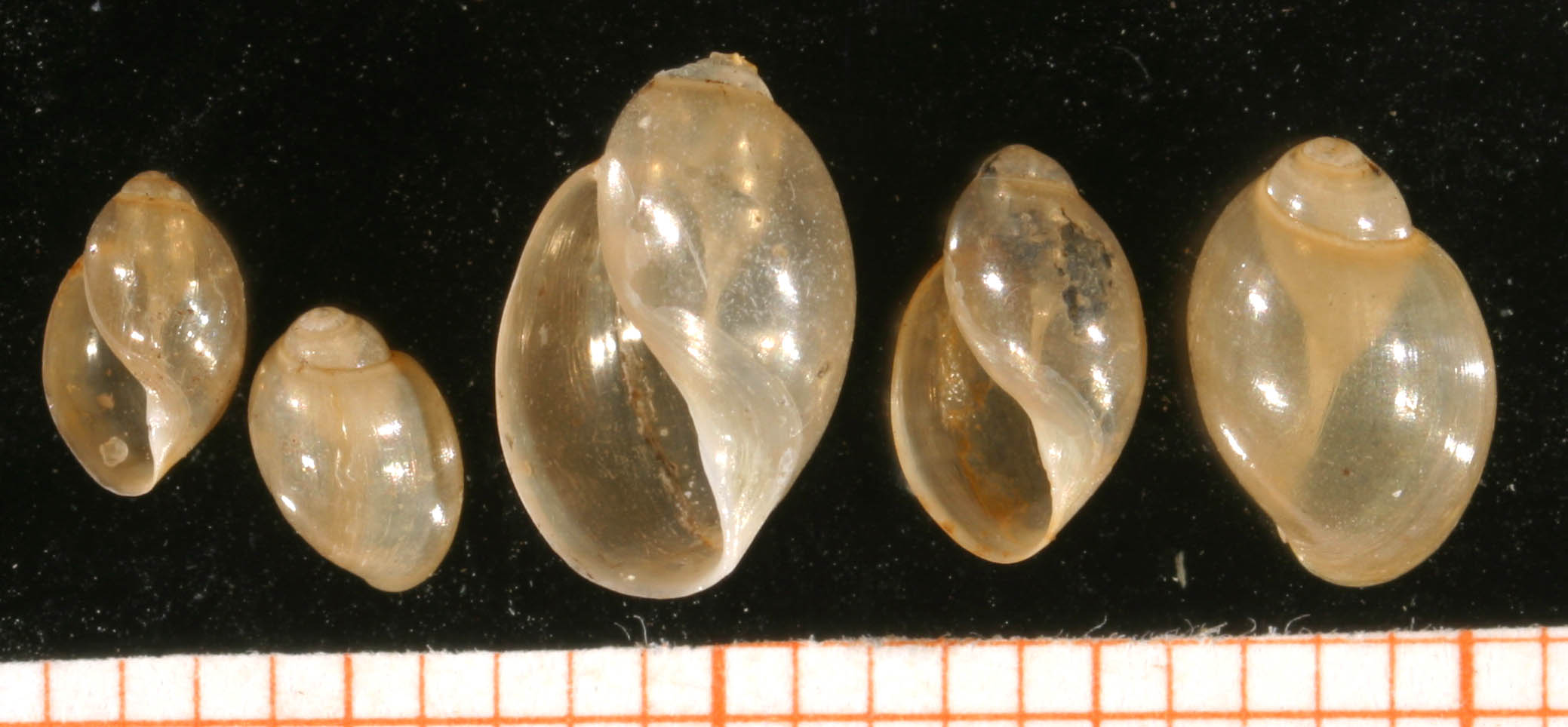
- Shells in differing orientations of Physa freshwater bladder snails
  Physa
  - †Physa meigsi
- Physella
  - †Physella heterostropha
- †Physeterula
- Physodon
  - †Physodon triqueter
- †Physogaleus
  - †Physogaleus contortus
- Pica
  - †Pica pica
- Picoides
  - †Picoides villosus – or unidentified comparable form
- Pilsbryspira
  - †Pilsbryspira leucocyma
- Pinctada
  - †Pinctada imbricata
- Pinna
- Pinus
  - †Pinus caribaea
  - †Pinus taeda
- †Pipilio
  - †Pipilio erythrophthalmus
- Pipilo
  - †Pipilo erythrophthalmus
- Pipistrellus
  - †Pipistrellus subflavus
- Pisania
  - †Pisania nux
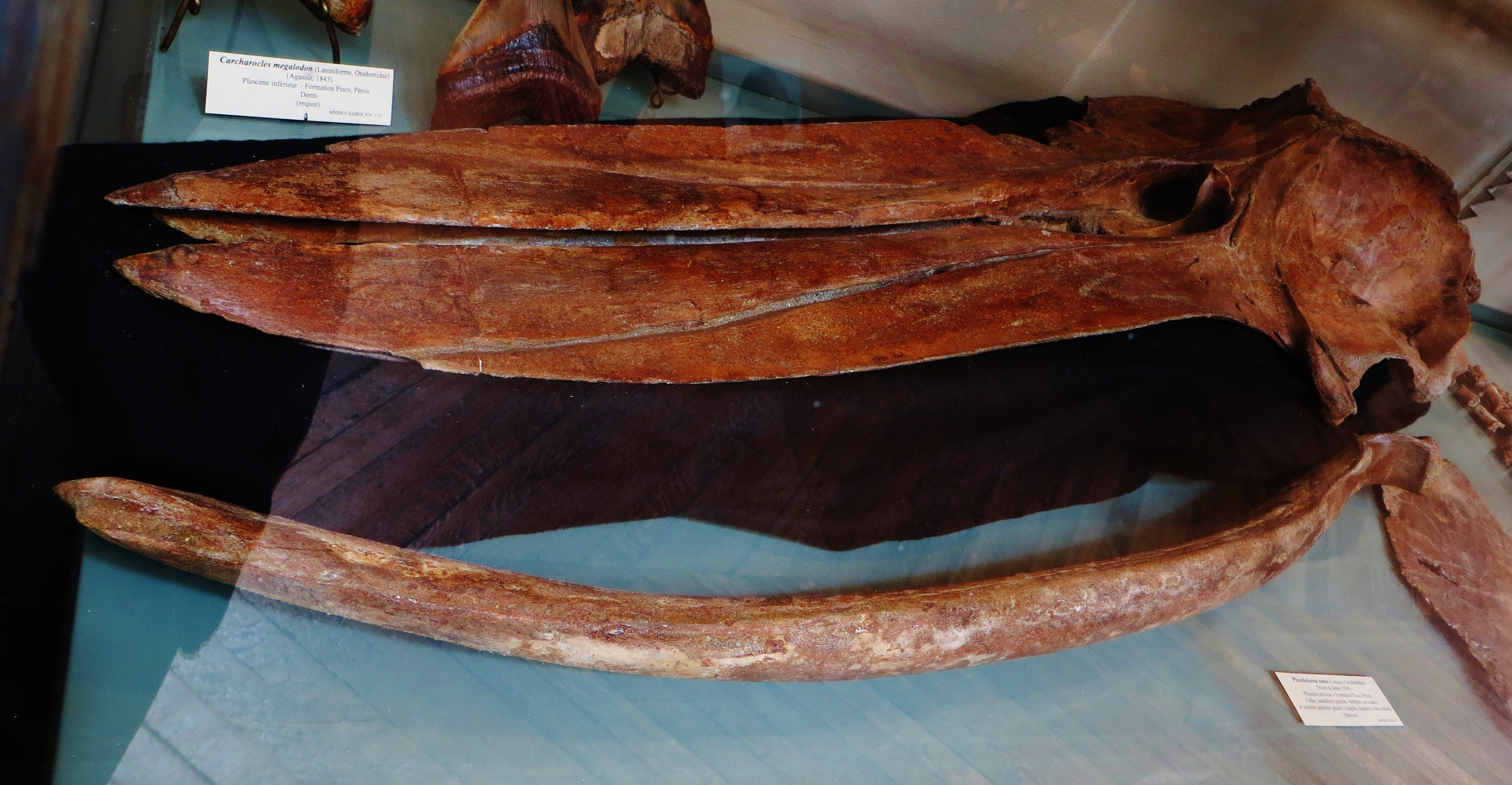
- Skull
  †Piscobalaena
- †Pistia
  - †Pistia spathulata
- Pitar
  - †Pitar cordatus
  - †Pitar cypta
  - †Pitar floridana
  - †Pitar morrhuanus
  - †Pitar prosayana
  - †Pitar simpsoni
  - †Pitar waltonensis
- Pitarella
  - †Pitarella calceola
- Pituophis
  - †Pituophis melanoleucas
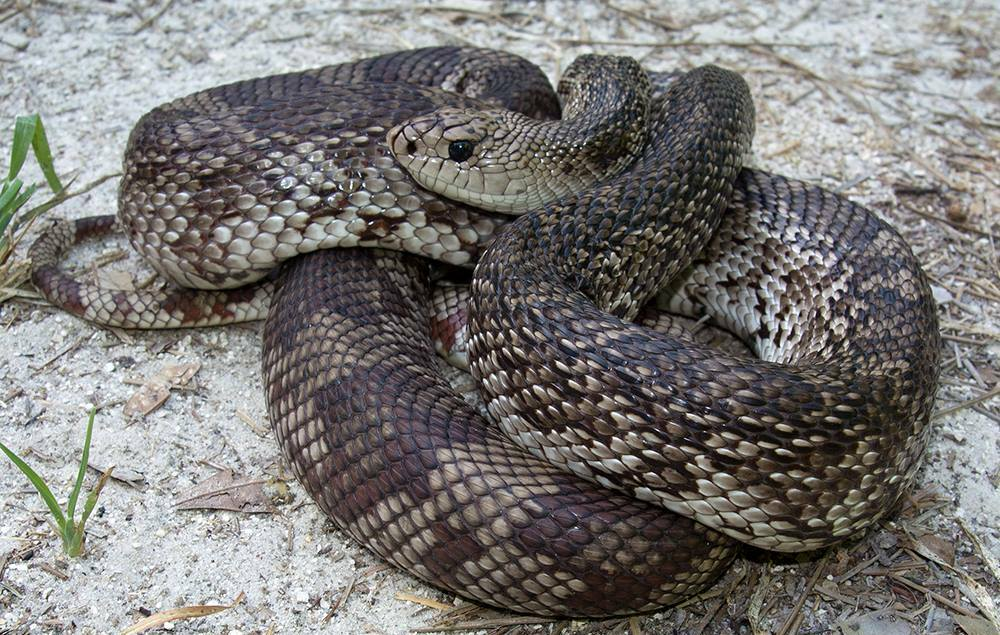
  - A living Pituophis melanoleucus, or pine snake
    †Pituophis melanoleucus
- Pitymys
  - †Pitymys mcnowni – or unidentified comparable form
- Placunanomia
  - †Placunanomia burnsi
  - †Placunanomia floridana
  - †Placunanomia plicata
- †Plagiarca
  - †Plagiarca arcula
  - †Plagiarca rhomboidella – or unidentified comparable form
- Plagiobrissus
  - †Plagiobrissus curvus
  - †Plagiobrissus dixie
- †Plagiosmittia
  - †Plagiosmittia incrustans – type locality for species
  - †Plagiosmittia regularis
- †Planecphora
  - †Planecphora hertweckorum
  - †Planecphora mansfieldi
- †Planicardium
  - †Planicardium virginianum
- †Planorbella
  - †Planorbella conanti
  - †Planorbella disstoni
  - †Planorbella duryi
  - †Planorbella scalaris
- Planorbis
  - †Planorbis elisus
  - †Planorbis tampaensis
  - †Planorbis willcoxii
- Planularia – tentative report
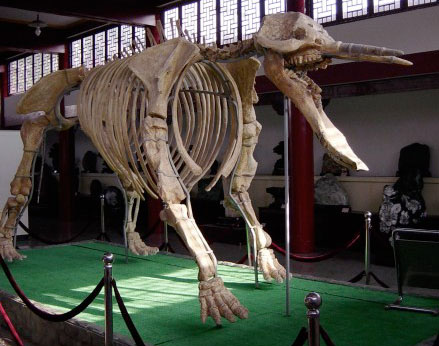
- Mounted fossilized skeleton of the Miocene elephant relative Platybelodon
  †Platybelodon
- †Platygonus
  - †Platygonus bicalcaratus
  - †Platygonus compressus
  - †Platygonus vetus
- †Platylepas
  - †Platylepas wilsoni
- †Playgonus
- Plecotus
  - †Plecotus rafinesquii
- Plectodon
  - †Plectodon granulatus
  - †Plectodon scabrata
- Plectofrondicularia
  - †Plectofrondicularia mansfieldi
- Plegadis
- †Pleiorhytis
  - †Pleiorhytis centenaria
- †Pleiorytis
  - †Pleiorytis bowenae
- Plethodon
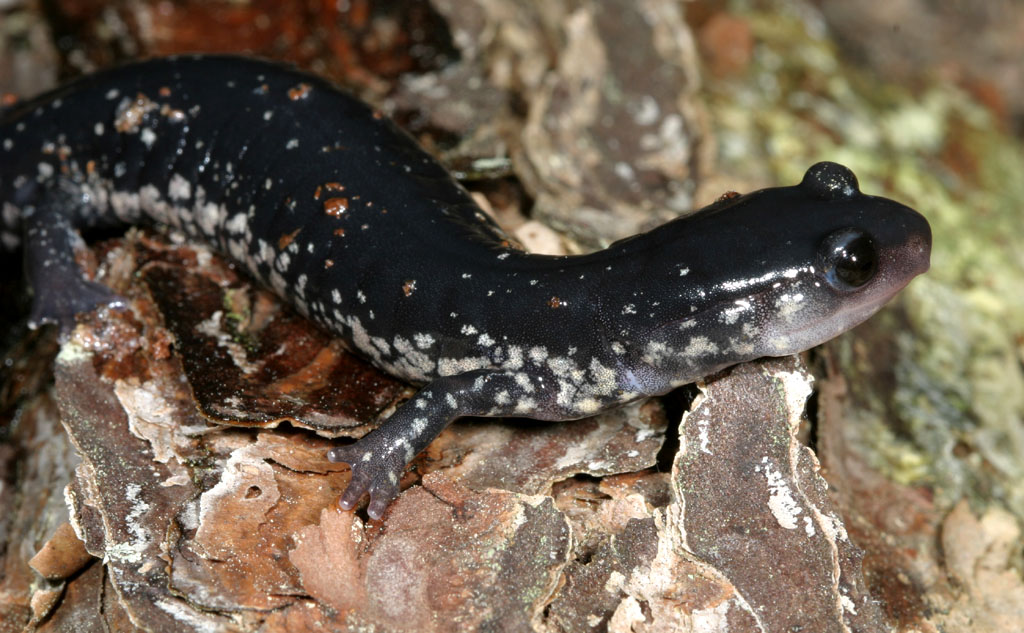
  - A living Plethodon glutinosus, or northern slimy salamander
    †Plethodon glutinosus
- †Pleurodonte
  - †Pleurodonte crusta
  - †Pleurodonte cunctator
  - †Pleurodonte diespiter
  - †Pleurodonte haruspica
  - †Pleurodonte kendrickensis
- Pleurofusia
  - †Pleurofusia brooksvillensis
  - †Pleurofusia dowlingi
  - †Pleurofusia plutonica
  - †Pleurofusia servata
- †Pleuroliria
- Pleuromeris
  - †Pleuromeris aposcitula
  - †Pleuromeris apsocitula
  - †Pleuromeris decemcostata
  - †Pleuromeris pitysia
  - †Pleuromeris scitula
  - †Pleuromeris scituloides
  - †Pleuromeris tellia
  - †Pleuromeris tridentata
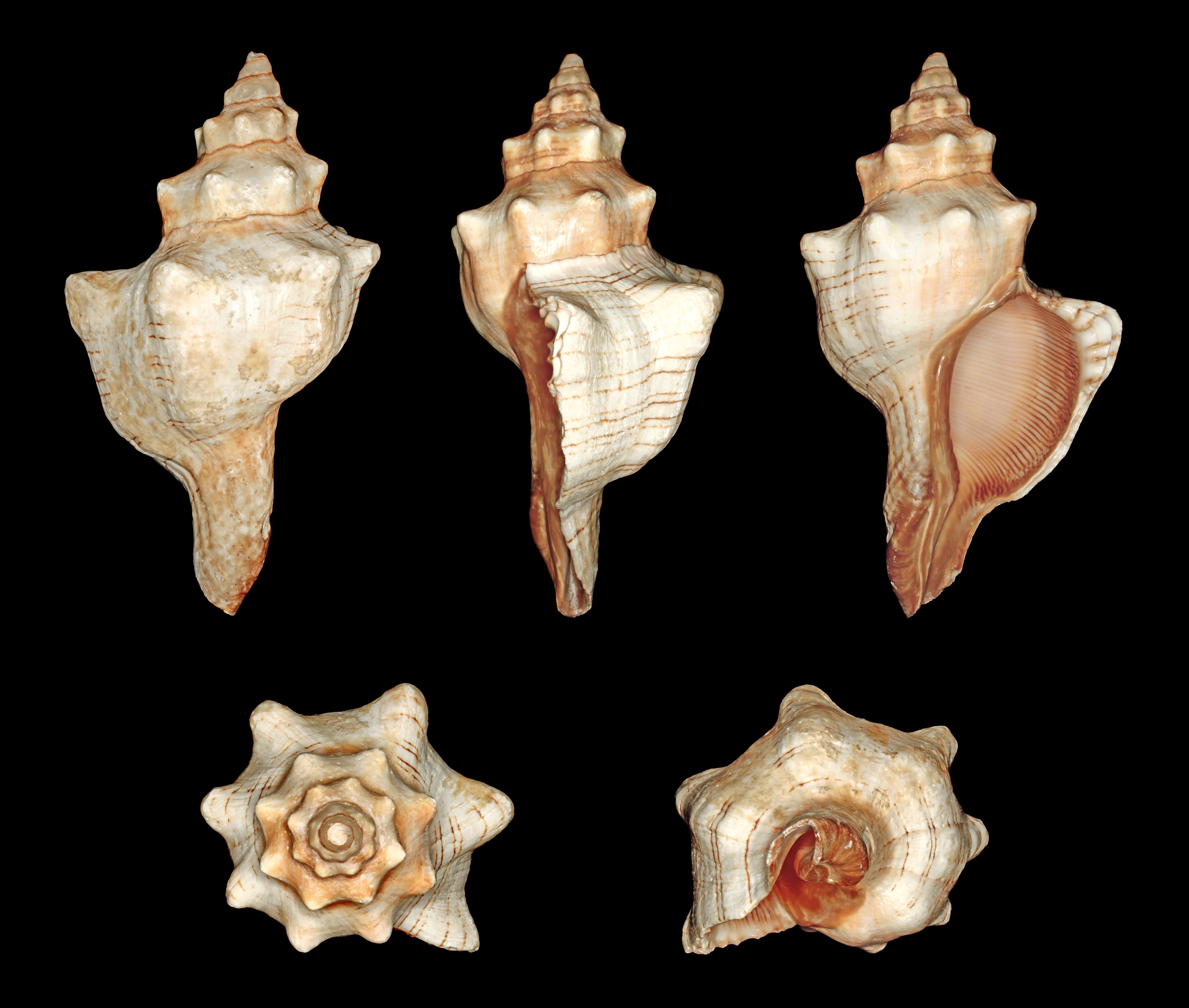
- Shell in multiple views of a Pleuroploca sea snail
  Pleuroploca
  - †Pleuroploca lindae
- Plicatula
  - †Plicatula densata
  - †Plicatula gibbosa
  - †Plicatula lepidota – type locality for species
  - †Plicatula romosa
- †Pliocyon
  - †Pliocyon robustus
- †Pliogyps
  - †Pliogyps charon – type locality for species
- †Pliohippus
  - †Pliohippus mirabilis
  - †Pliohippus pernix
- †Pliometanastes
  - †Pliometanastes protistus – type locality for species
- †Plionarctos
- †Plionictis – tentative report
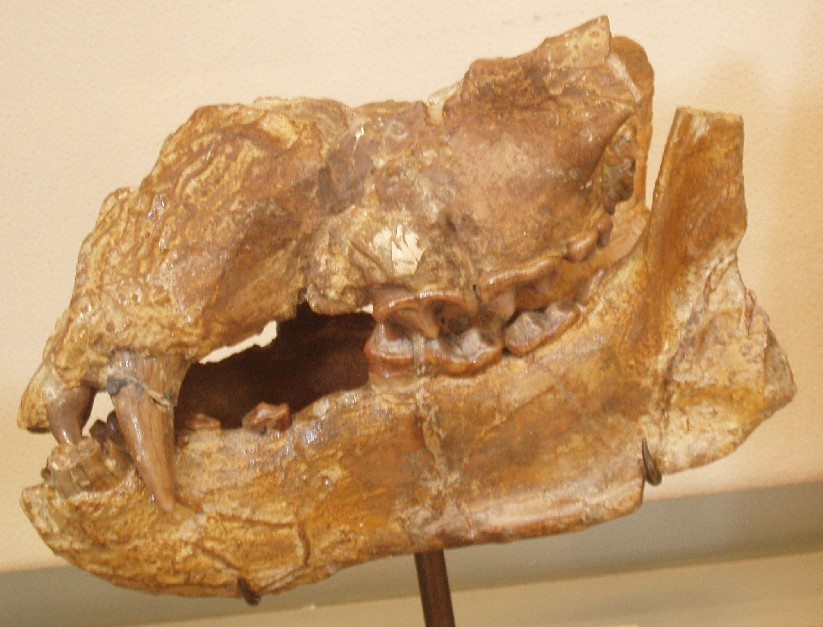
- Fossilized partial skull of the Miocene dog-like bear relative Plithocyon
  †Plithocyon – or unidentified comparable form
- Pocillopora
  - †Pocillopora baracoaensis
  - †Pocillopora crassoramosa
- Podiceps
  - †Podiceps auritus
  - †Podiceps dixi
- Podilymbus
  - †Podilymbus magnus
  - †Podilymbus podiceps
- Pododesmus
  - †Pododesmus scopelus
- Podomys
  - †Podomys floridanus
- †Poecilia
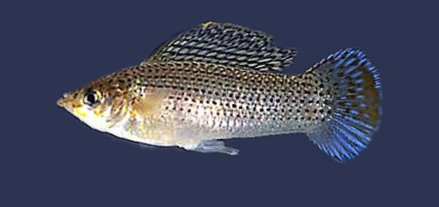
  - A living Poecilia latipinna, or sailfin molly
    †Poecilia latipinna
- Pogonias
  - †Pogonias cromis
- Poirieria
  - †Poirieria alaquaensis
  - †Poirieria clarksvillensis – type locality for species
  - †Poirieria fusinoides – type locality for species
  - †Poirieria heilprini
  - †Poirieria laccopoia – type locality for species
  - †Poirieria lychnia – type locality for species
  - †Poirieria mauryae – type locality for species
  - †Poirieria phagon – type locality for species
  - †Poirieria rufirupicolus
- †Polidevcia
  - †Polidevcia flexuosa
- Polinices
  - †Polinices caroliniana
  - †Polinices coensis
  - †Polinices demicryptus
  - †Polinices hepaticus
  - †Polinices judsoni
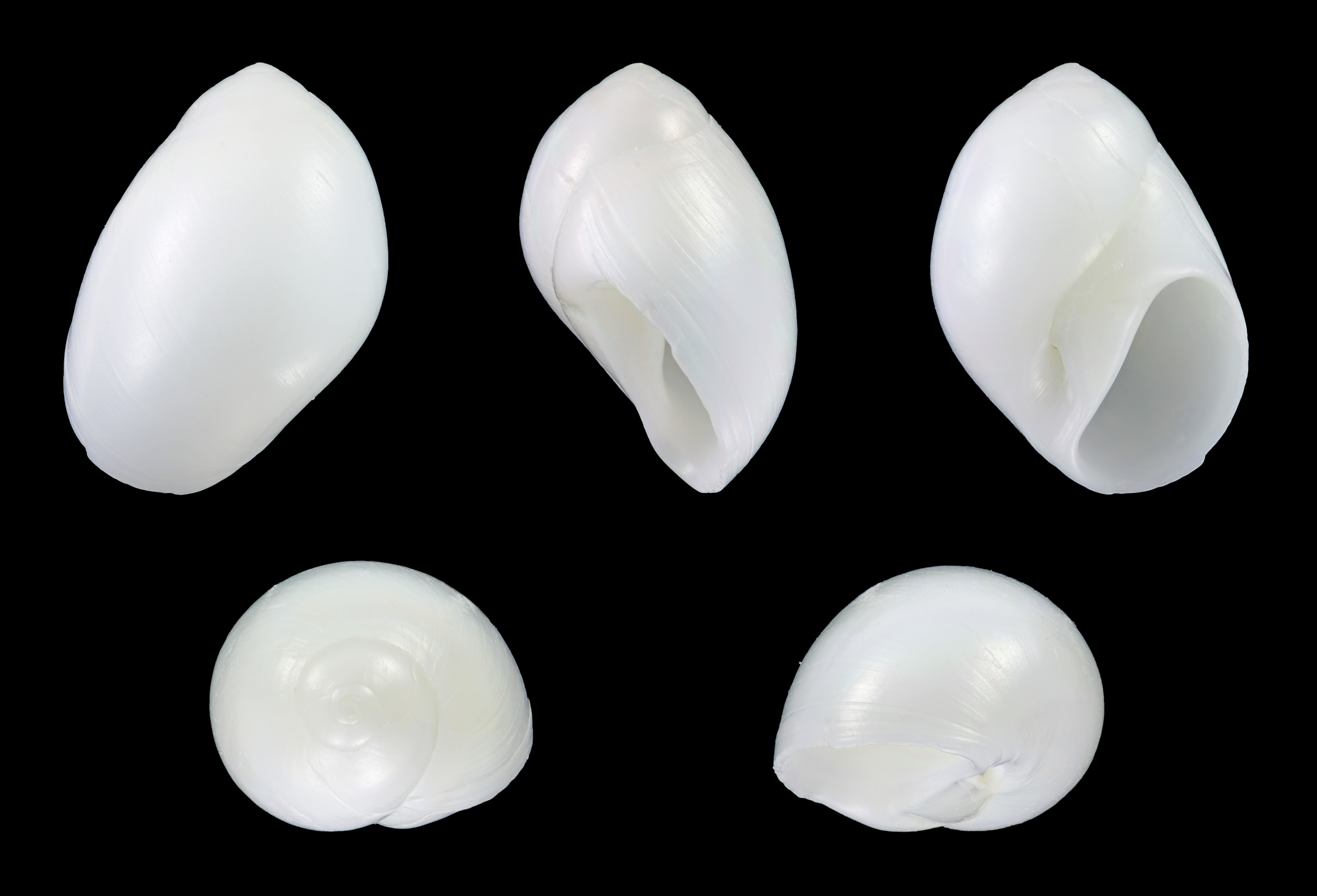
  - Shell in multiple views of a Polinices lacteus, or milk moon sea snai
    †Polinices lacteus
  - †Polinices porcellanus
  - †Polinices robustus – type locality for species
  - †Polinices uber
- Polygireulima
  - †Polygireulima calkinsi
  - †Polygireulima chipolana
  - †Polygireulima conchita
  - †Polygireulima defuniak – type locality for species
  - †Polygireulima fargoi
  - †Polygireulima gibberula
  - †Polygireulima magnoliana
  - †Polygireulima makista
  - †Polygireulima suavis
- Polygonum
- Polygyra
  - †Polygyra adamnis
  - †Polygyra cereolus
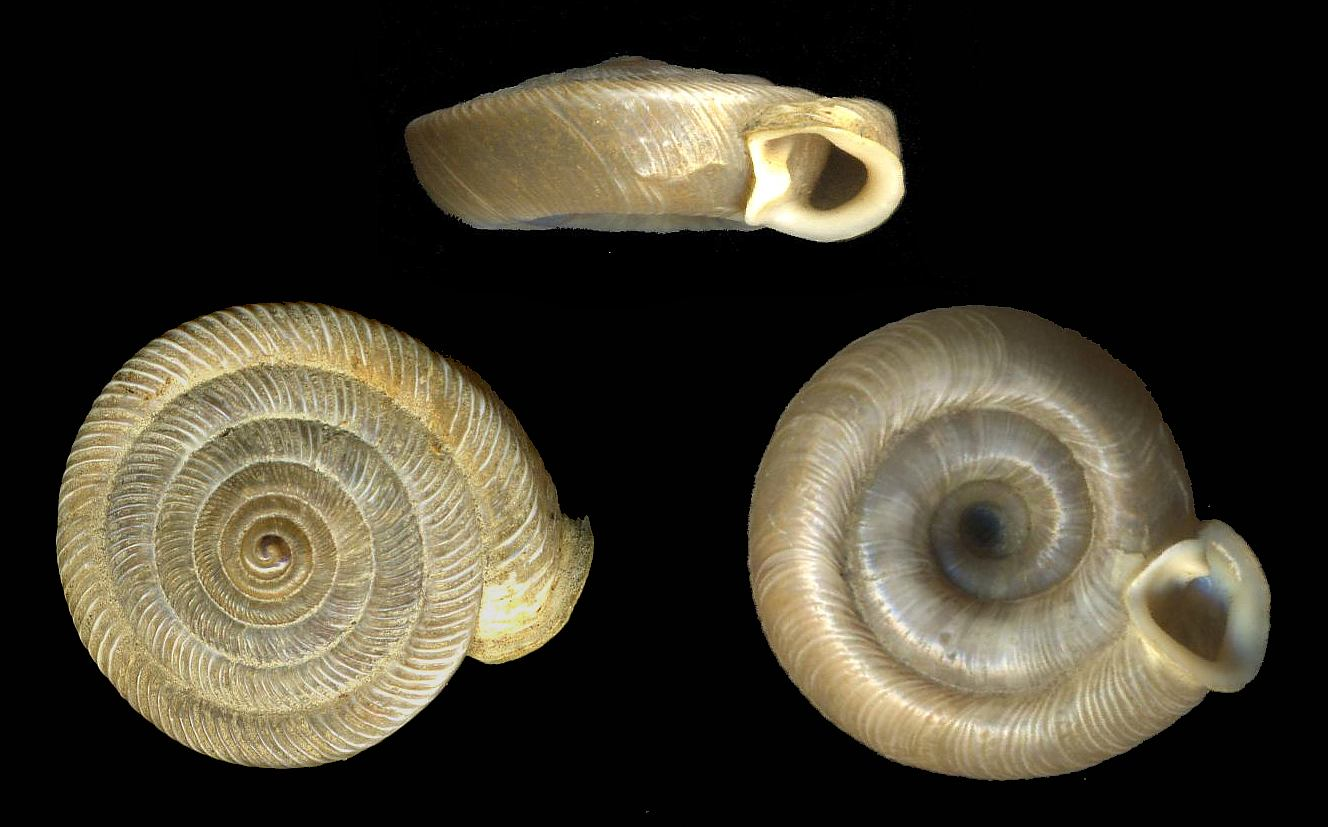
  - Shell in multiple views of a Polygyra septemvolva land snail
    †Polygyra septemvolva
- Polymorphina
  - †Polymorphina advena – or unidentified comparable form
- Polyschides
  - †Polyschides lobion – type locality for species
  - †Polyschides quadridentatus
- Polystira
  - †Polystira albida
  - †Polystira albidata – or unidentified loosely related form
  - †Polystira albidoides – type locality for species
  - †Polystira subsimilis
  - †Polystira tampensis
  - †Polystira tenagos – type locality for species
- Pomacea
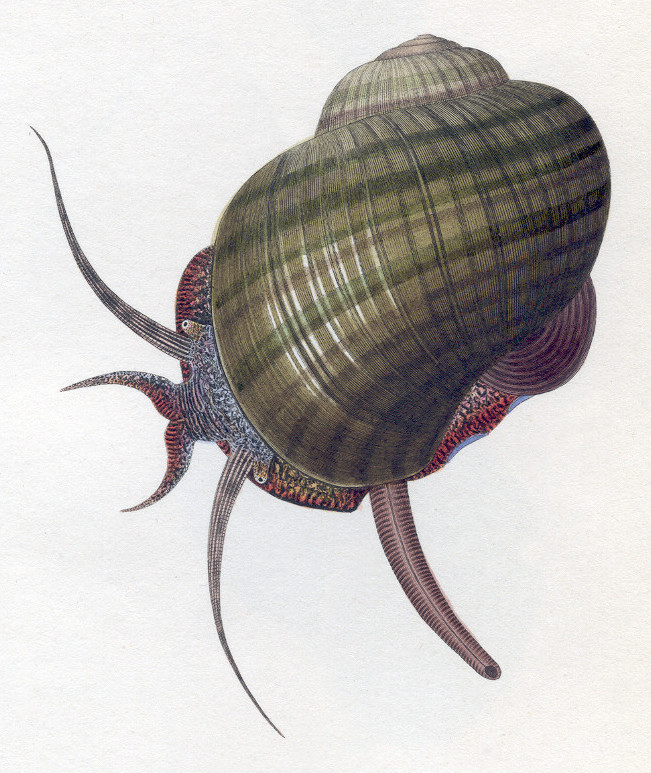
  - Illustration of a living Pomacea paludosa, or freshwater Florida applesnail
    †Pomacea paludosa
- Pomatodelphis
  - †Pomatodelphis bobengi – type locality for species
  - †Pomatodelphis inaequalis – type locality for species
- Poricellaria
  - †Poricellaria vernoni – type locality for species
- Porites
  - †Porites astreoides
  - †Porites barracoaensis
  - †Porites chipolanum – type locality for species
  - †Porites divaricata
  - †Porites floridaeprima
  - †Porites furcata
  - †Porites matanzaensis
  - †Porites porites
- Poromya
  - †Poromya floridana
- †Poropeltarion – type locality for genus
  - †Poropeltarion newelli – type locality for species
- Porphyrula
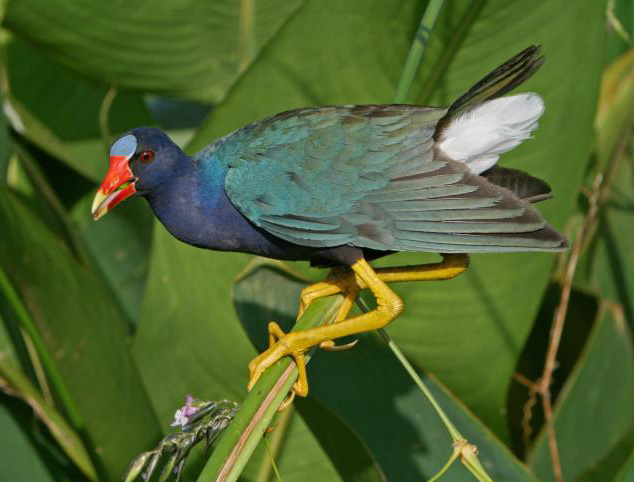
  - A living Porphyrio martinicus, or American purple gallinule
    †Porphyrula martinica
- Portunus
- Porzana
  - †Porzana auffenbergi – type locality for species
  - †Porzana carolina
- †Potamides
  - †Potamides aspalagensis
  - †Potamides cornutus – tentative report
  - †Potamides hillsboroensis
  - †Potamides suprasulcatus
  - †Potamides transecta
- †Pratilepus – tentative report
- †Primonatalus – type locality for genus
  - †Primonatalus prattae – type locality for species
- Prionocidaris
  - †Prionocidaris cookei
- Prionotus
- †Prismacerithium
  - †Prismacerithium prisma
- Pristis
  - †Pristis aquitanicus
- †Proacris – type locality for genus
  - †Proacris mintoni – type locality for species
- †Probalearica
  - †Probalearica crataegensis – type locality for species
- †Procamelus
  - †Procamelus grandis
- †Procranioceras
  - †Procranioceras skinneri – or unidentified comparable form
- Procyon
  - †Procyon lotor – type locality for species
- †Proheteromys
  - †Proheteromys floridanus – type locality for species
- †Promantellum
  - †Promantellum florpacifica
- †Promilio
  - †Promilio brodkorbi – type locality for species
  - †Promilio epileus – type locality for species
  - †Promilio floridanus – type locality for species
- †Pronotolagus
- †Propelargus
  - †Propelargus olseni – type locality for species
- †Prosthennops
  - †Prosthennops xiphodonticus
- †Prosynthetoceras
  - †Prosynthetoceras texanus
- †Protocardia
  - †Protocardia jacksonense
- †Protocitta
  - †Protocitta dixi
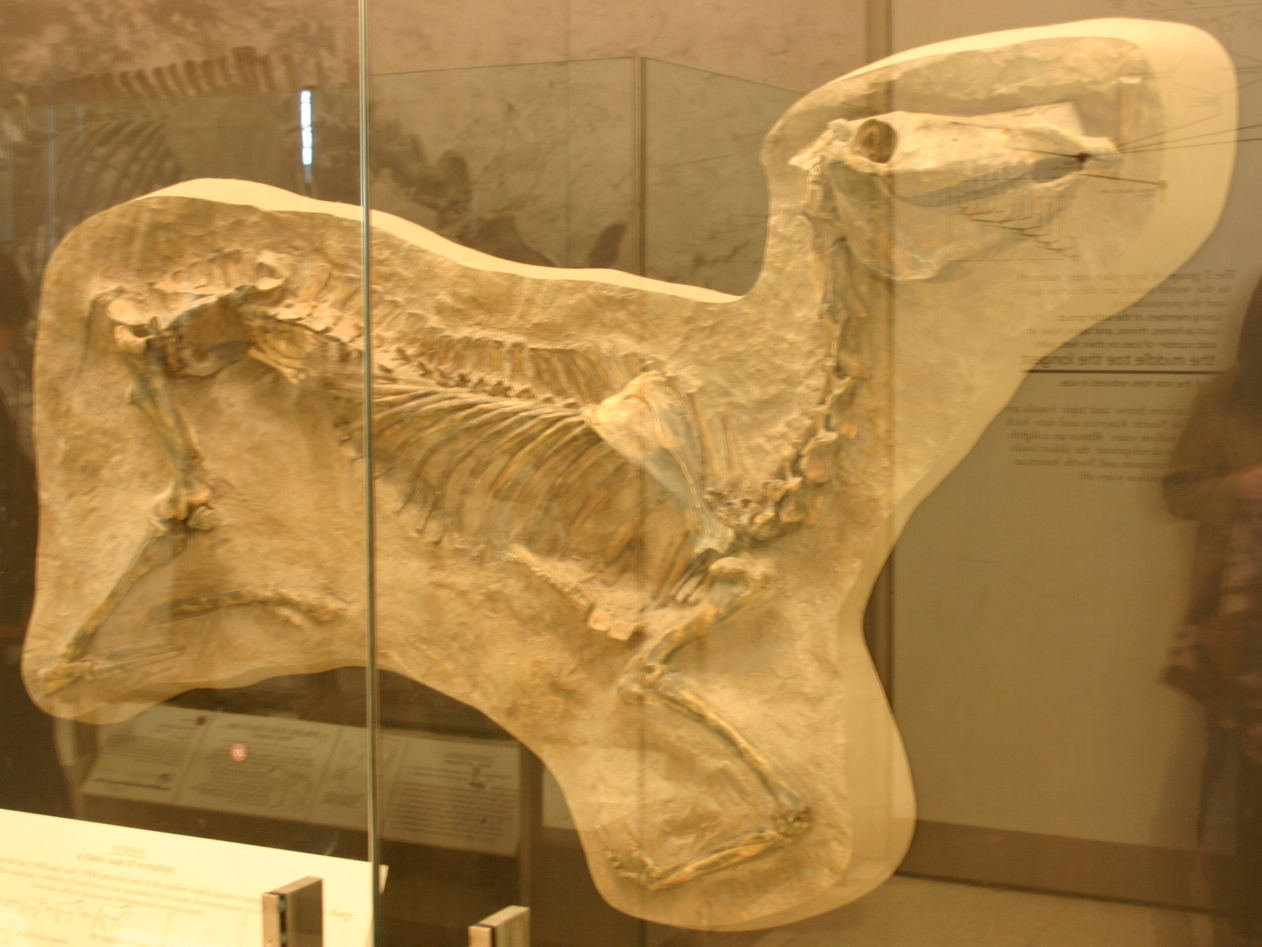
- Fossilized skeleton of the Miocene horse Protohippus
  †Protohippus
  - †Protohippus gidleyi
  - †Protohippus perditus
  - †Protohippus supremus
- †Protosciurus
- †Protosiren
- †Protospermophilus – tentative report
- Prunum
  - †Prunum amabile
  - †Prunum apalachee – type locality for species
  - †Prunum apicinum
  - †Prunum aurora
  - †Prunum bellum
  - †Prunum capsa – type locality for species
  - †Prunum donovani
  - †Prunum eleutheria – type locality for species
  - †Prunum ericae
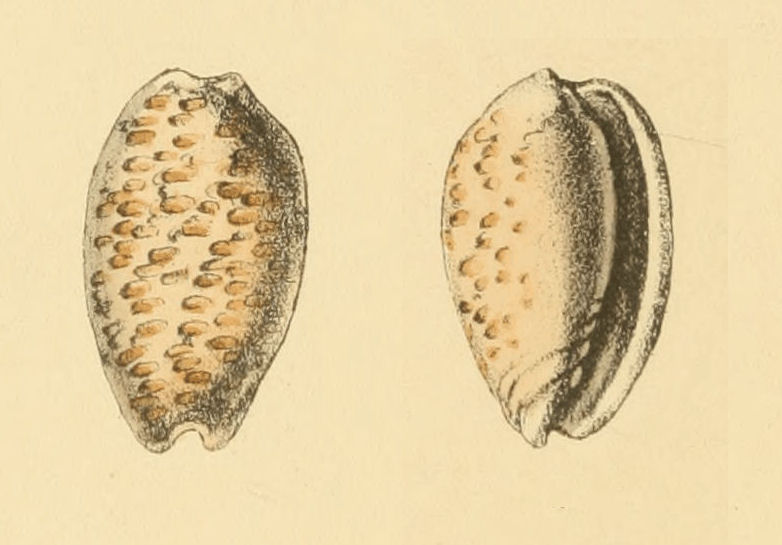
  - Illustration of the shell in multiple views of a Prunum guttatum margin sea snail
    †Prunum guttatum
  - †Prunum inntensa
  - †Prunum jessicae
  - †Prunum limatulum
  - †Prunum lipara – type locality for species
  - †Prunum myrina
  - †Prunum oliviformis
  - †Prunum onichidella
  - †Prunum precursor
  - †Prunum roscidum
  - †Prunum sandrae
- Psammacoma
  - †Psammacoma holmesii – tentative report
  - †Psammacoma hosfordensis
  - †Psammacoma marmorea – type locality for species
  - †Psammacoma tageliformis
  - †Psammacoma torynoides – type locality for species
- Psammechinus
- Psammotreta
  - †Psammotreta intastriata
- †Psamosolen
  - †Psamosolen aldrichi – type locality for species
  - †Psamosolen sanctidominica – or unidentified related form
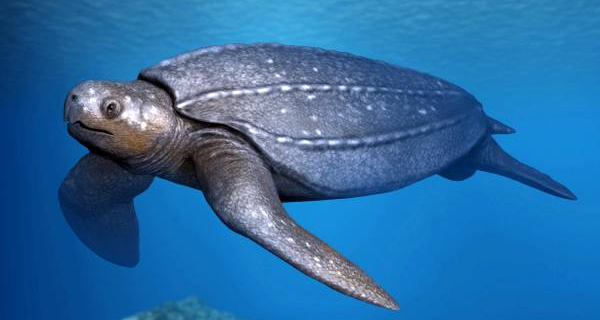
- Hypothetical restoration of the Oligocene-Pliocene sea turtle Psephophorus
  †Psephophorus
- Pseudacris
  - †Pseudacris ornata
- †Pseudadusta
  - †Pseudadusta hertweckorum
  - †Pseudadusta kalafuti
  - †Pseudadusta ketteri
  - †Pseudadusta lindae
  - †Pseudadusta marilynae
- Pseudemys
  - †Pseudemys caelata – type locality for species
  - †Pseudemys concinna
  - †Pseudemys floridana
  - †Pseudemys nelsoni
  - †Pseudemys platymarginata
  - †Pseudemys williamsi
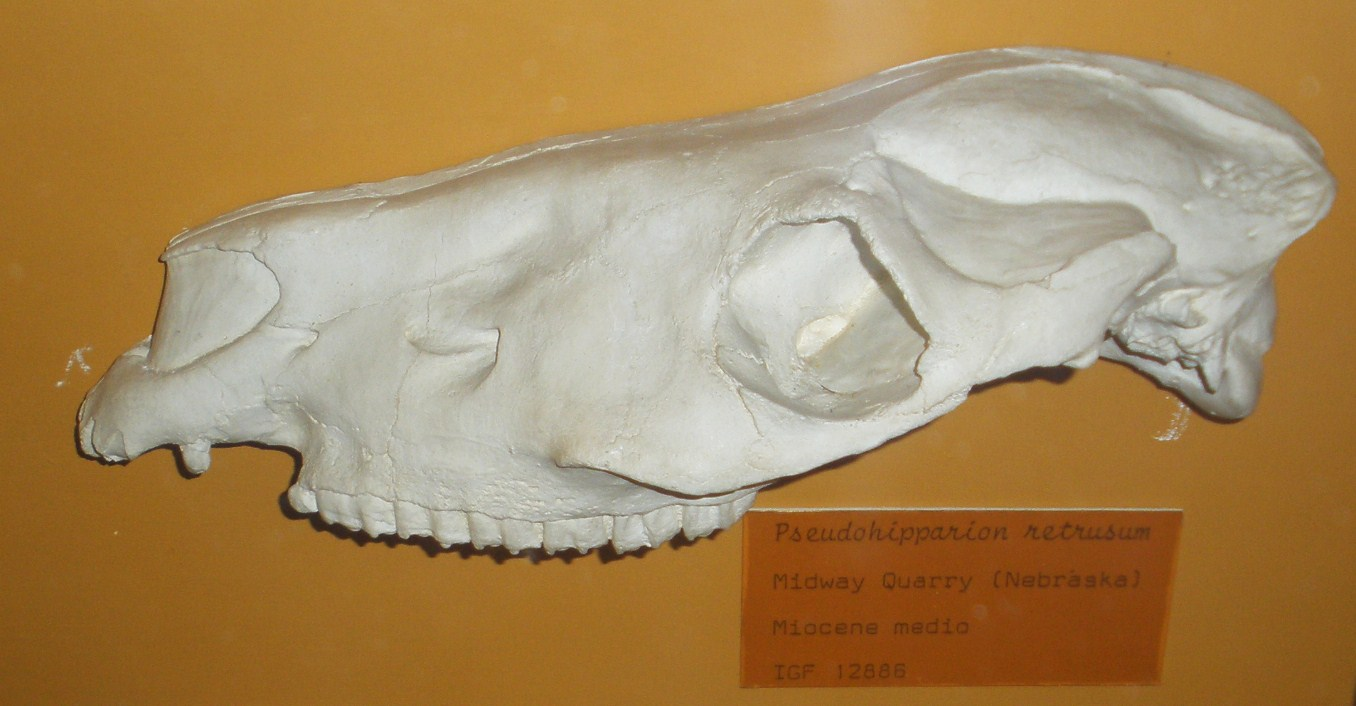
- Replica of a fossilized cranium of the Miocene horse Pseudhipparion
  †Pseudhipparion
  - †Pseudhipparion curtivallum
  - †Pseudhipparion simpsoni
  - †Pseudhipparion skinneri
- †Pseudoaluca
  - †Pseudoaluca clarki – type locality for species
- †Pseudoaluco
  - †Pseudoaluco clarki
- †Pseudobranchus
  - †Pseudobranchus robustus – type locality for species
  - †Pseudobranchus vetustus – type locality for species
- †Pseudocemophora – type locality for genus
  - †Pseudocemophora antiqua – type locality for species
- †Pseudoceras
  - †Pseudoceras skinneri
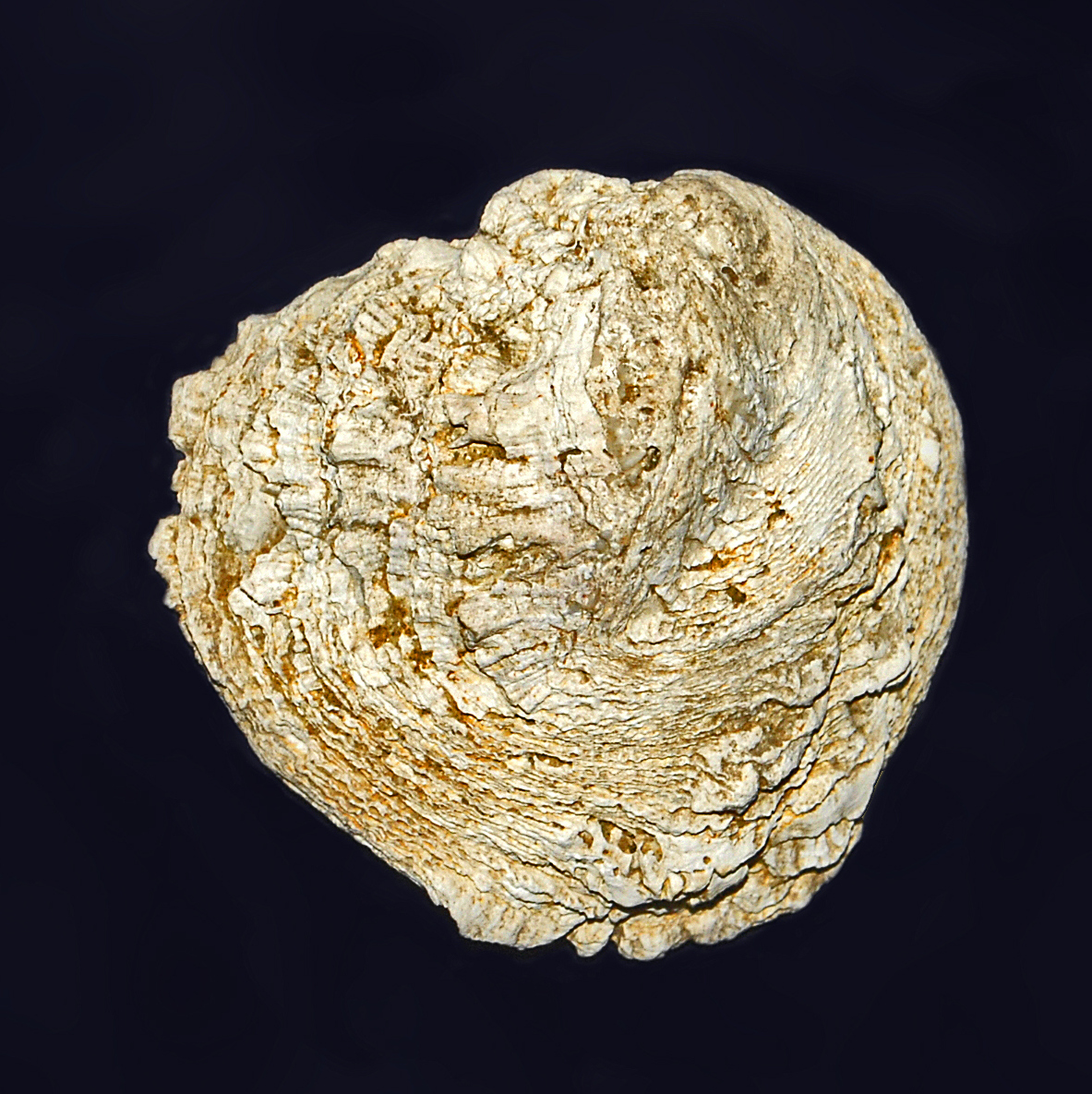
- Fossilized shell of the Eocene-modern jewelbox marine bivalve Pseudochama
  Pseudochama
  - †Pseudochama chipolana
  - †Pseudochama corticosa
  - †Pseudochama striata
- Pseudodiploria
  - †Pseudodiploria clivosa
  - †Pseudodiploria sarasotana
  - †Pseudodiploria strigosa
- Pseudomiltha
  - †Pseudomiltha paranodonta – type locality for species
- Pseudosuccinea
  - †Pseudosuccinea columella
- Pseudotorinia
  - †Pseudotorinia bisulcata
  - †Pseudotorinia nupera
- Pseudozonaria
  - †Pseudozonaria portelli
- Psilaxis
  - †Psilaxis verecunda
- Pteria
  - †Pteria chipolana
  - †Pteria colymbus
  - †Pteria multangula
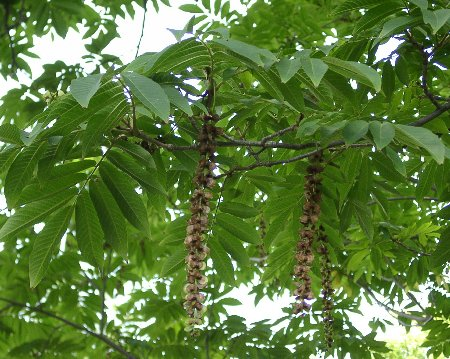
- A living Pterocarya or wingnut tree
  Pterocarya
- †Pterohytis
  - †Pterohytis conradi
- Pteromeris
  - †Pteromeris perplana
- Pteropurpura
  - †Pteropurpura dryas – type locality for species
  - †Pteropurpura virginiae
- †Pterorhytis
  - †Pterorhytis fluviana
  - †Pterorhytis lindae
  - †Pterorhytis marshalli
  - †Pterorhytis roxaneae
  - †Pterorhytis seminola
  - †Pterorhytis squamulosa
  - †Pterorhytis umbrifer
  - †Pterorhytis wilsoni
- Pterorytis
  - †Pterorytis dryas
- †Pterosphenus
  - †Pterosphenus schucherti
- Pterotyphis
  - †Pterotyphis calhounensis – type locality for species
  - †Pterotyphis triangularis
  - †Pterotyphis vokesae
- †Pterygoboa
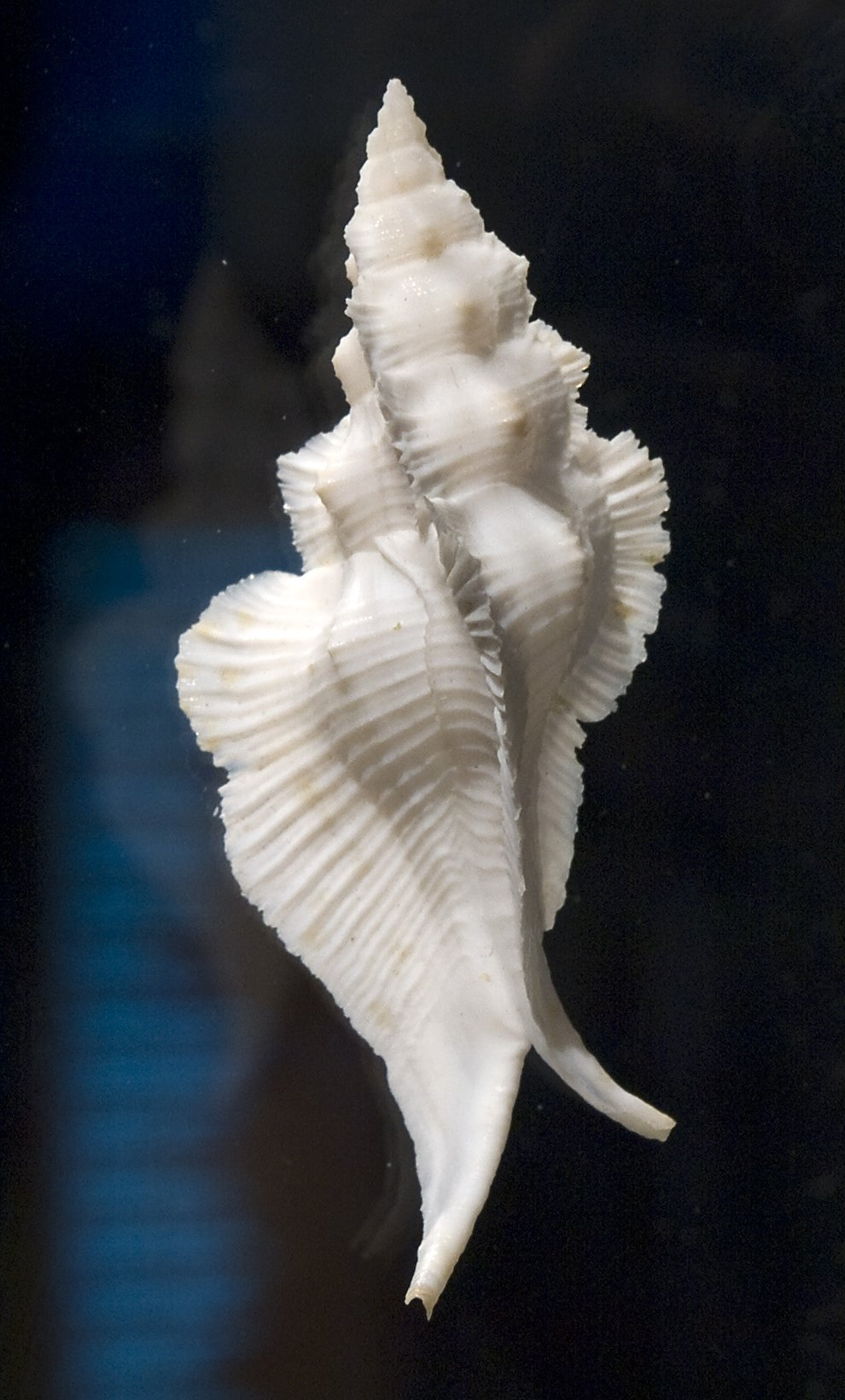
- Shell of a Pterynotus alatus murex sea snail
  Pterynotus
  - †Pterynotus hoerlei – type locality for species
  - †Pterynotus phyllopterus
  - †Pterynotus pinnatus
  - †Pterynotus propeposti
- †Ptychosalpinx
  - †Ptychosalpinx duerri
- Puffinus
  - †Puffinus micraulax – type locality for species
  - †Puffinus puffinus
- Pugnus
  - †Pugnus lachrimula
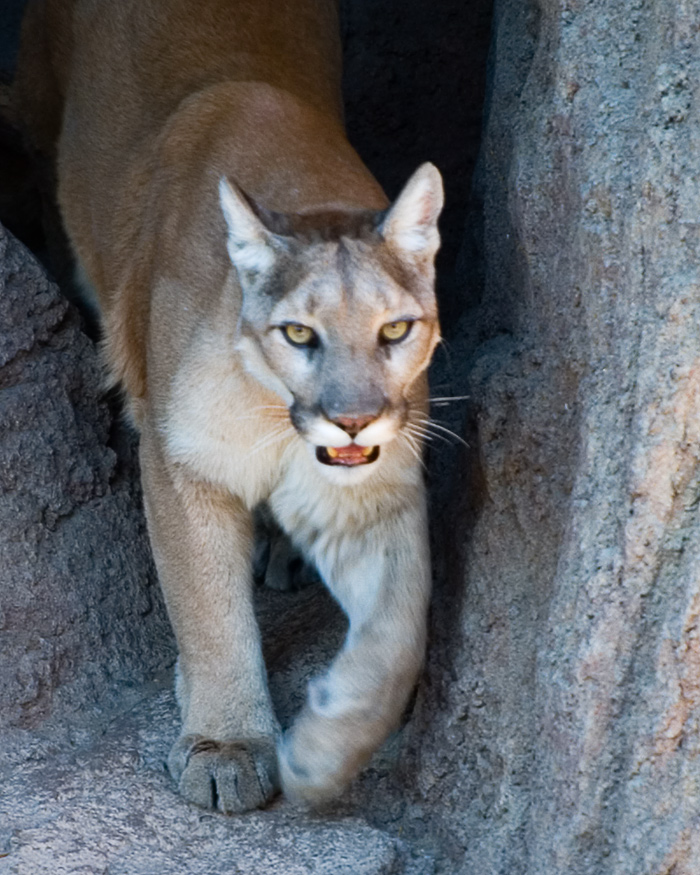
- A living Puma
  †Puma
  - †Puma concolor
- Pupoides
  - †Pupoides albilabris
  - †Pupoides pilsbryi
- Puriana
  - †Puriana rugipunctata
- Purpura
  - †Purpura haemostoma
  - †Purpura marshalli
  - †Purpura postii
  - †Purpura scabrosa
- Pusula
  - †Pusula crovoae
  - †Pusula dadeensis
  - †Pusula lindajoyceae
  - †Pusula miccosukee
  - †Pusula pediculus
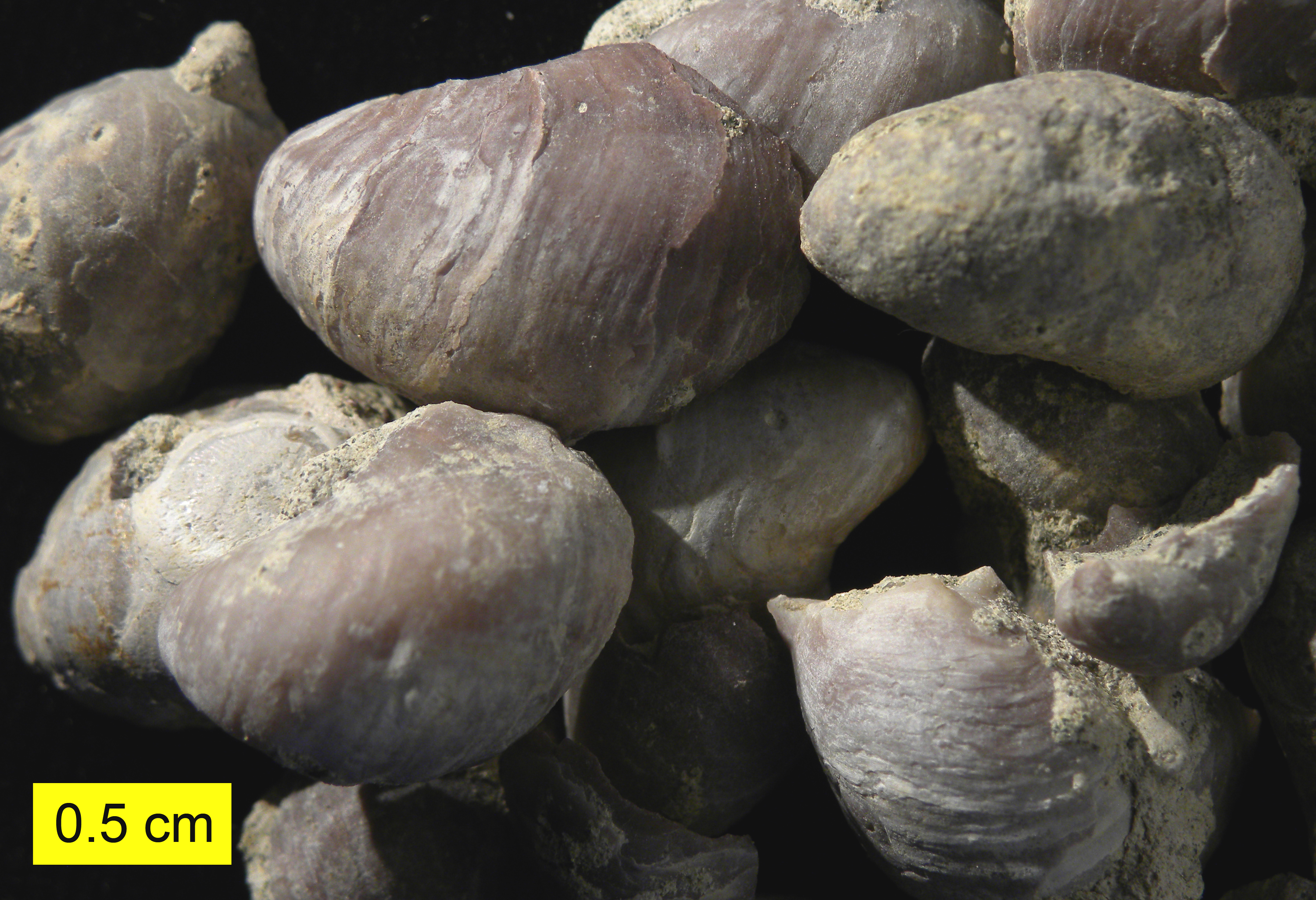
- Assemblage of fossilized shells of the Cretaceous-Pleistocene oyster Pycnodonte
  Pycnodonte
  - †Pycnodonte antiguensis – or unidentified related form
  - †Pycnodonte leeana
  - †Pycnodonte trigonalis
- Pygmaepterys
  - †Pygmaepterys drezi – type locality for species
  - †Pygmaepterys pratulum – type locality for species
- Pyramidella
  - †Pyramidella suturalis
- †Pyrazisinus
  - †Pyrazisinus acutus
  - †Pyrazisinus campanulatus
  - †Pyrazisinus cornutus
  - †Pyrazisinus ecarinatus
  - †Pyrazisinus gravesae
  - †Pyrazisinus intermedius
  - †Pyrazisinus kendrewi
  - †Pyrazisinus kissimmeensis
  - †Pyrazisinus lindae
  - †Pyrazisinus palmbeachensis
  - †Pyrazisinus roseae
  - †Pyrazisinus sarastoaensis
  - †Pyrazisinus scalatus
  - †Pyrazisinus scalinus
  - †Pyrazisinus turriculis
  - †Pyrazisinus ultimus – type locality for species
- †Pyrazosomis
  - †Pyrazosomis miamiensis
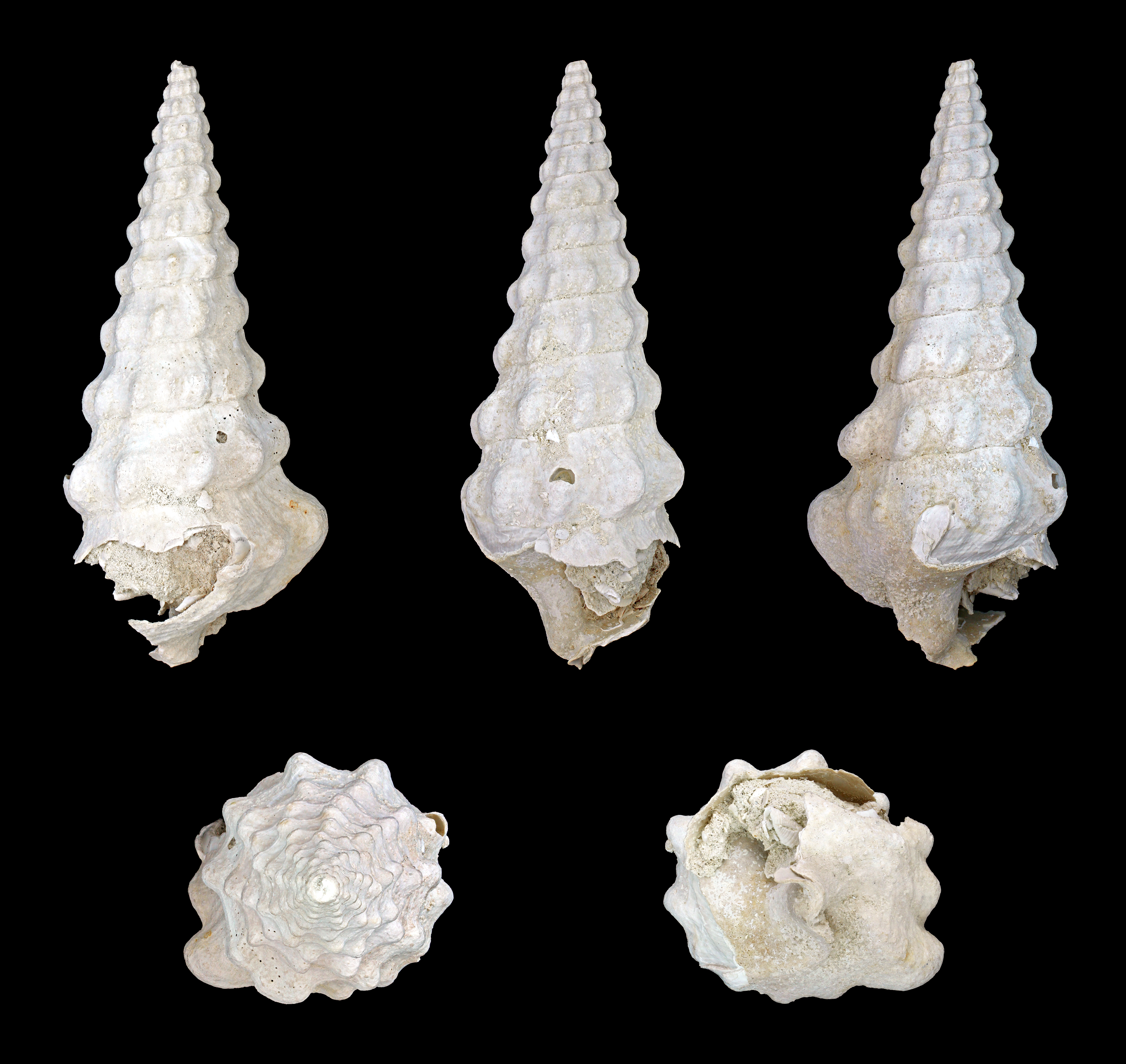
- Pyrazus
  Pyrazus
  - †Pyrazus scalatus
- Pyrgocythara
  - †Pyrgocythara coxi
  - †Pyrgocythara plicosa
- Pyrgoma
  - †Pyrgoma preftoridanum
- Pyrgospira
  - †Pyrgospira acurugata
  - †Pyrgospira ostrearum
  - †Pyrgospira tampaensis
- †Pyrigiscus
  - †Pyrigiscus parkeri – or unidentified comparable form
  - †Pyrigiscus sisphusi – or unidentified comparable form
  - †Pyrigiscus tellusae – or unidentified comparable form
  - †Pyrigiscus yama – or unidentified comparable form
- †Pyruconus
  - †Pyruconus druidi
- †Pyurella
  - †Pyurella demistriatum
  - †Pyurella seminole
  - †Pyurella turbinalis

== Q ==
- Quercus
  - †Quercus brevifolia
  - †Quercus chapmani – tentative report
  - †Quercus laurifolia
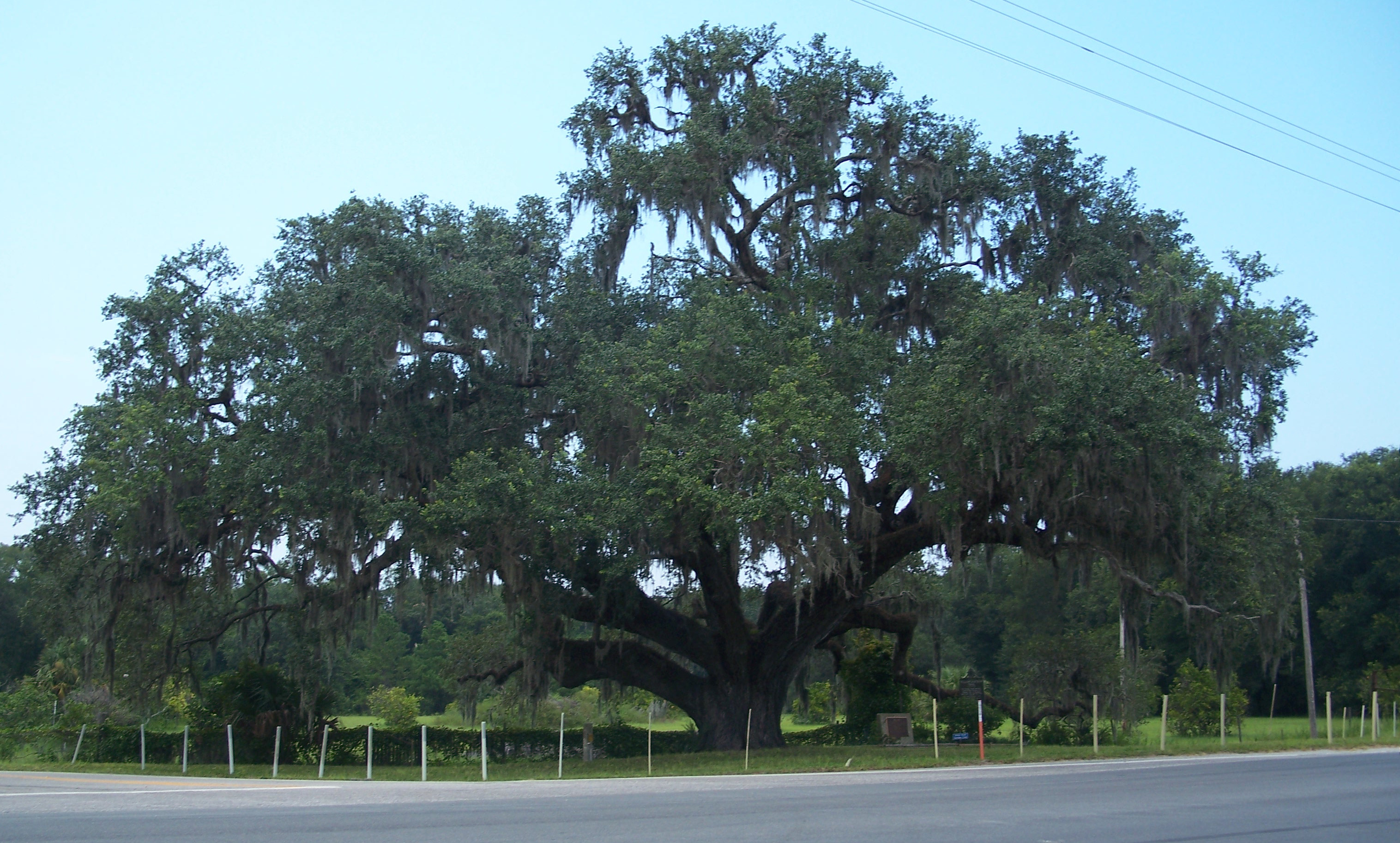
  - A living Quercus virginiana, or southern live oak
    †Quercus virginiana
- Querquedula
  - †Querquedula discors
  - †Querquedula floridana
  - †Querquedula floridiana – type locality for species
- Quinqueloculina
  - †Quinqueloculina lamarckiana
  - †Quinqueloculina seminula
  - †Quinqueloculina subpoeyana – tentative report
- Quiscalus
  - †Quiscalus major
  - †Quiscalus mexicanus
  - †Quiscalus quiscula

== R ==
- Radiolucina
  - †Radiolucina amianta
  - †Radiolucina arrionta
- Raeta
  - †Raeta plicatella
- †Rakomeryx
- Rallus
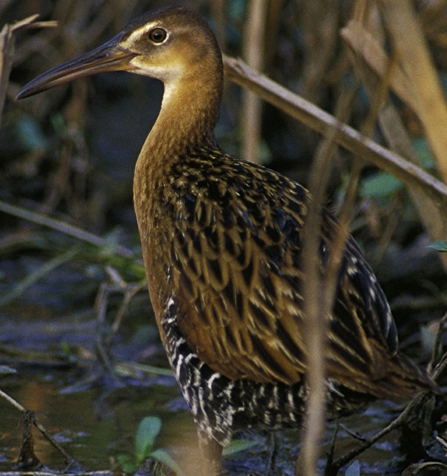
  - A living Rallus elegans, or king rail
    †Rallus elegans
  - †Rallus limicola
  - †Rallus longirostris
- †Rana
  - †Rana capito
  - †Rana catesbeiana
  - †Rana grylio
  - †Rana pipiens
  - †Rana utricularia
- Rangia
  - †Rangia cuneata
  - †Rangia cyrenoides – or unidentified comparable form
- Rapana
  - †Rapana vaughani
- Recurvirostra
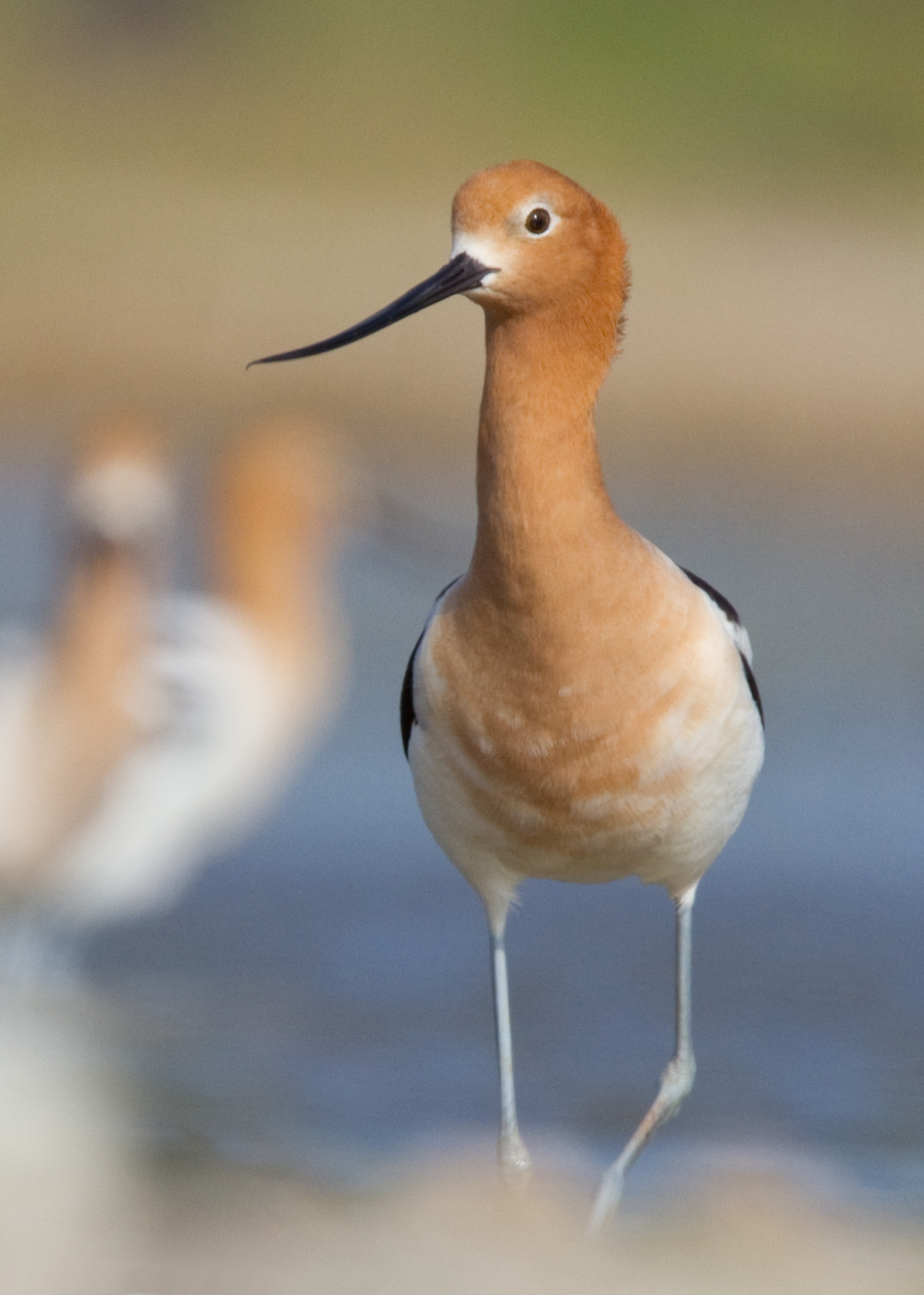
  - A living Recurvirostra americana, or American avocet
    †Recurvirostra americana
- †Regina – or unidentified comparable form
  - †Regina alleni
- Reithrodontomys
  - †Reithrodontomys humulis
  - †Reithrodontomys wetmorei
- Reteporella
  - †Reteporella scutulata
- †Reticulocythereis
  - †Reticulocythereis floridana
- Retilaskeya
  - †Retilaskeya bicolor
- Retusa – tentative report
  - †Retusa vaginata
- Reusella
  - †Reusella spinulosa
- Reussella
  - †Reussella eocena
  - †Reussella spinulosa
- Rhadinaea
  - †Rhadinaea flavilata
- †Rhadinea
  - †Rhadinea flavilata
- †Rhegminornis
  - †Rhegminornis calobates – type locality for species
- Rhineura
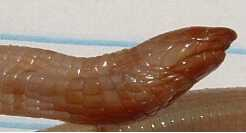
  - A living Rhineura floridana, or North American worm lizard
    †Rhineura floridana
- Rhinoclavis
  - †Rhinoclavis caloosaenis
  - †Rhinoclavis caloosaensis
  - †Rhinoclavis chipolana
  - †Rhinoclavis ocalana
  - †Rhinoclavis parrishi – type locality for species
- Rhinoptera
  - †Rhinoptera bonasus
- Rhizoprionodon
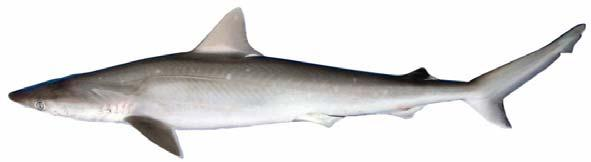
  - A living Rhizoprionodon terraenovae, or Atlantic sharpnose shark
    †Rhizoprionodon terraenovae
  - †Rhizoprionodon terranovae
- Rhyncholampas
  - †Rhyncholampas chipolanus
  - †Rhyncholampas ericsoni
  - †Rhyncholampas evergladensis
  - †Rhyncholampas globosus
  - †Rhyncholampas gouldii
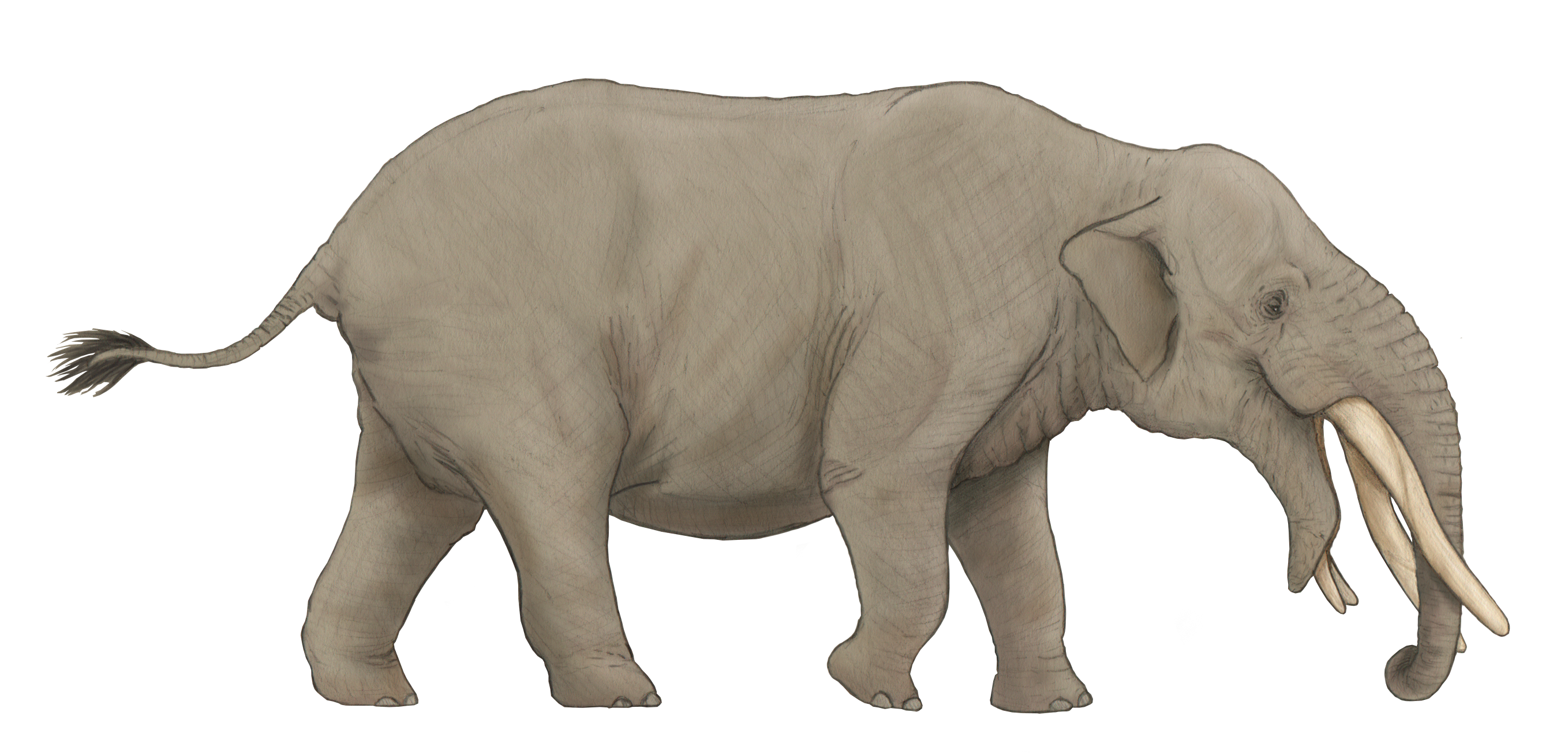
- Restoration of the Miocene-Pliocene elephant relative Rhynchotherium
  †Rhynchotherium
  - †Rhynchotherium edense
- †Richmondena
  - †Richmondena cardinalis
- Rictaxis
  - †Rictaxis fusulus
  - †Rictaxis myakkanus
- Rimella
  - †Rimella smithii
- Rimula
  - †Rimula woodringi
- Ringicula
  - †Ringicula boyntoni – type locality for species
  - †Ringicula chipolana
  - †Ringicula floridana
  - †Ringicula semilimata
  - †Ringicula stiphera – type locality for species
- Rissoa
  - †Rissoa lipeus
  - †Rissoa phagon – type locality for species
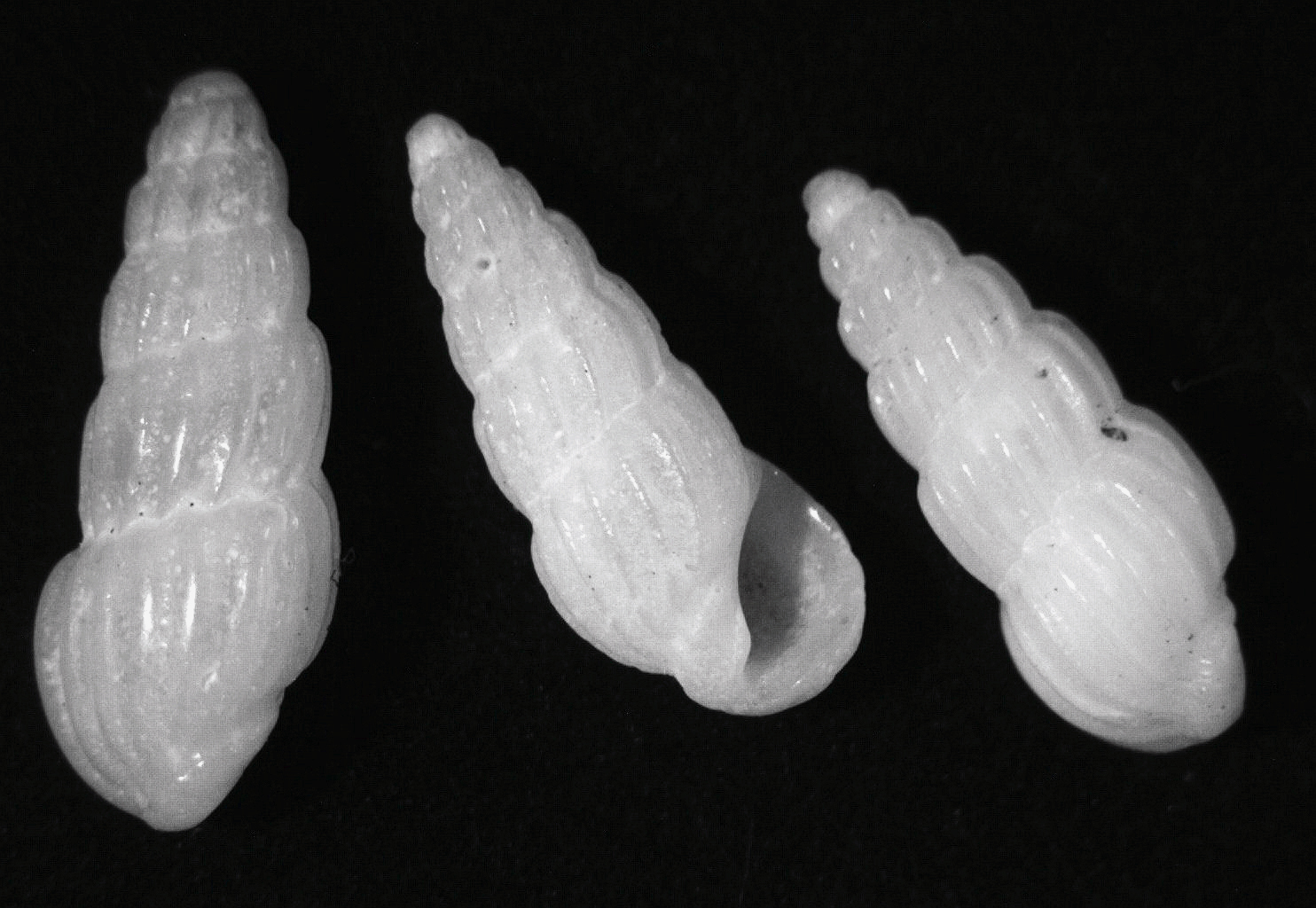
- Fossilized shells of the sea snail Rissoina
  Rissoina
  - †Rissoina bulimina
  - †Rissoina catesbyana
  - †Rissoina chesnelii
  - †Rissoina chipolana
  - †Rissoina floridana
  - †Rissoina juncea – type locality for species
  - †Rissoina liriope
  - †Rissoina parkeri
  - †Rissoina planata
  - †Rissoina sagraiana
  - †Rissoina striatocostata
- †Rissonia
  - †Rissonia supralaevigata
- Robulus
  - †Robulus americanus
  - †Robulus iotus
  - †Robulus vaughani
- Rosseliana
  - †Rosseliana parvipora
- Rostellaria
  - †Rostellaria watermani
- †Rotalia
  - †Rotalia beccarii
  - †Rotalia cushmani
- †Rothpletzia
  - †Rothpletzia floridana – type locality for species
- Roxania
  - †Roxania chipolana
  - †Roxania funiakensis
- Rupellaria
  - †Rupellaria grinnelli
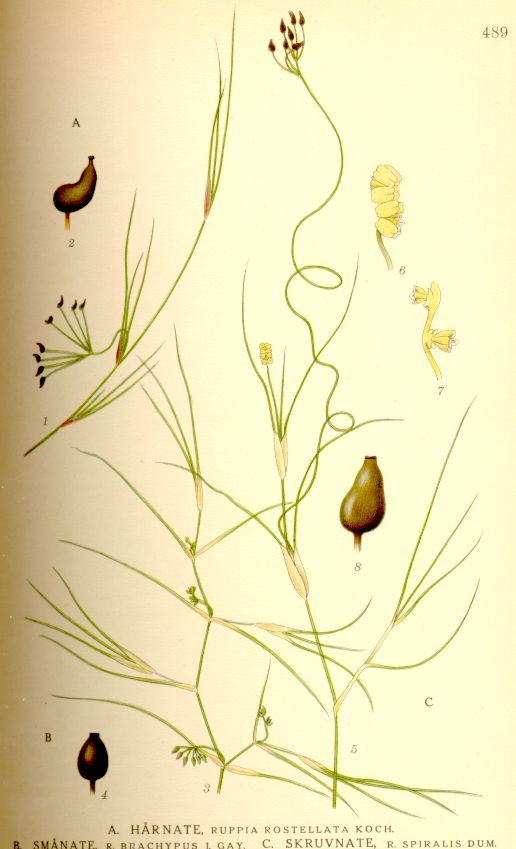
- Illustration of living Ruppia, or widgeonweeds
  Ruppia – or unidentified related form

== S ==
- Sabal
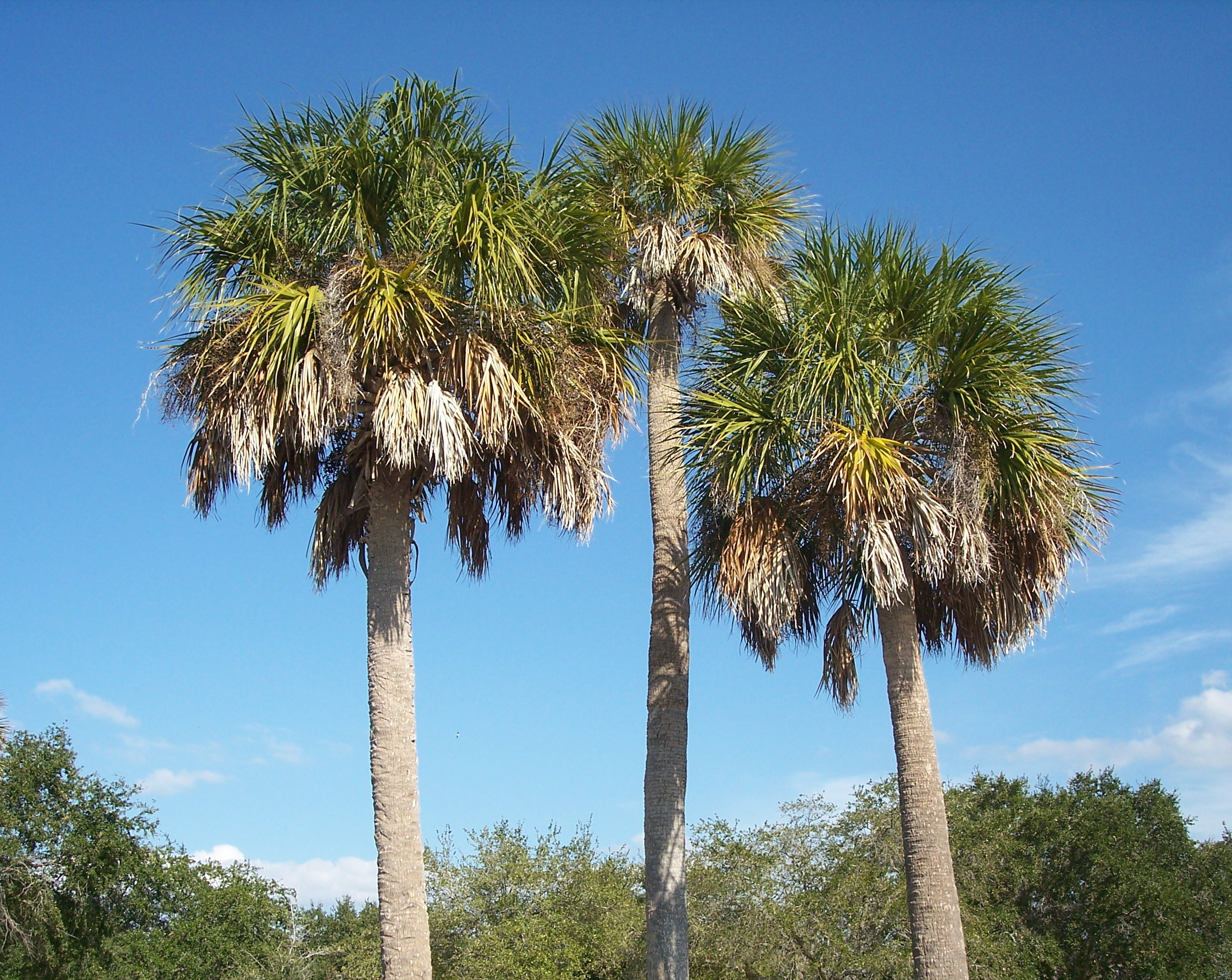
  - Living Sabal palmetto
    †Sabal palmetto
- Saccella
  - †Saccella canonica
  - †Saccella polychoa
  - †Saccella trochilia
- †Saccharoturris
  - †Saccharoturris centrodes – type locality for species
- †Sagitteria
- †Sarcenaria
  - †Sarcenaria acutauricularis
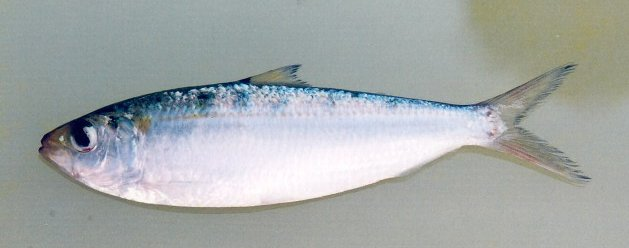
- A living Sardinella
  Sardinella
- Sassia
  - †Sassia jacksonensis – type locality for species
- †Satherium
  - †Satherium piscinarium
- †Scala
  - †Scala virginiae
- †Scalanassa
  - †Scalanassa evergladensis
  - †Scalanassa olssoni
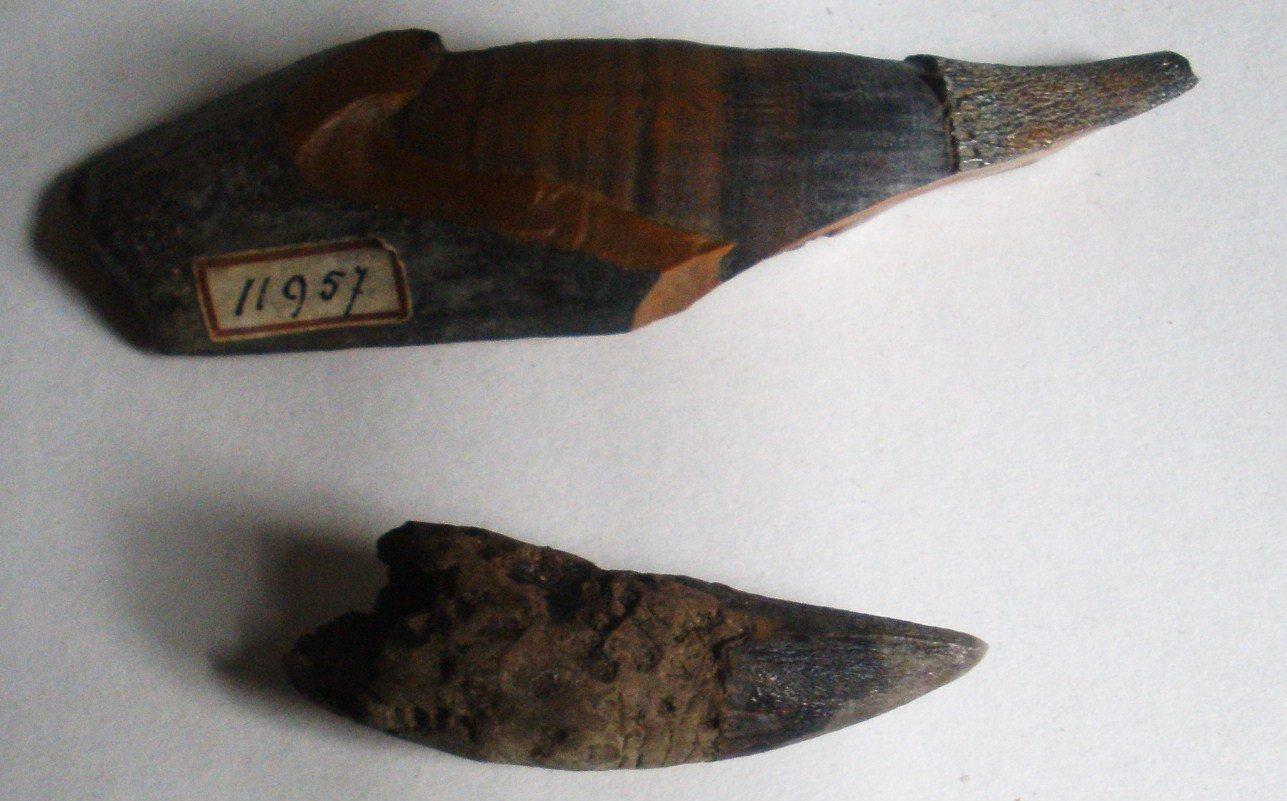
- Fossilized teeth of the Neogene sperm whale Scaldicetus
  †Scaldicetus
- †Scalla
- †Scalopoides – or unidentified related form
- Scalopus
  - †Scalopus aquaticus
- Scalpellum
  - †Scalpellum gibbum
- †Scambula
  - †Scambula alaquensis
- Scaphander
  - †Scaphander ballista
  - †Scaphander ballistus
  - †Scaphander langdoni
  - †Scaphander richardsi – type locality for species
- Scapharca
  - †Scapharca campechiensis
- Scaphella
  - †Scaphella brennmortoni
  - †Scaphella floridana
  - †Scaphella gravesae
  - †Scaphella griffini
  - †Scaphella junonia
  - †Scaphella martinshugari
  - †Scaphella maureenae
  - †Scaphella oleiniki
  - †Scaphella seminole
  - †Scaphella tenholmii
  - †Scaphella tomscotti
  - †Scaphella trenhomii
- Scaphiopus
  - †Scaphiopus holbrooki
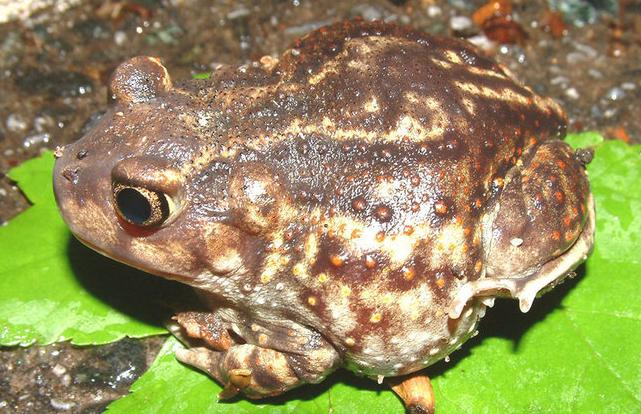
  - A living Scaphiopus holbrookii, or eastern spadefoot toad
    †Scaphiopus holbrookii
- †Schisomopora
  - †Schisomopora umbonata
- Schizaster
  - †Schizaster americanus
  - †Schizaster ocalanus
- †Schizobathysella
  - †Schizobathysella saccifera
- Schizomavella
  - †Schizomavella arborea
  - †Schizomavella granulifera
  - †Schizomavella granulosa
  - †Schizomavella porosa
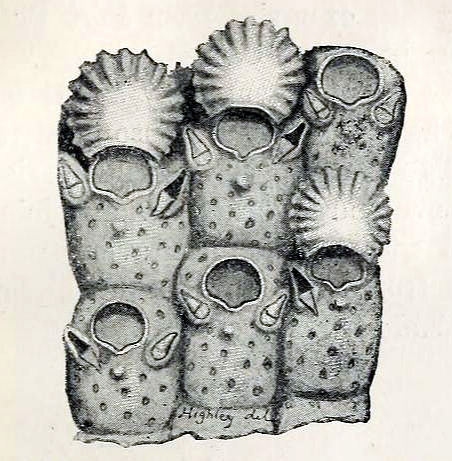
- Illustration of a close-up view of a Schizoporella bryozoan ("moss animal")
  Schizoporella
  - †Schizoporella gunteri – type locality for species
  - †Schizoporella marginata
  - †Schizoporella viminea
- †Sciadopitys
- †Sciaenopus
  - †Sciaenopus ocellatus
- Sciuropterus
  - †Sciuropterus volans
- Sciurus
  - †Sciurus carolinensis
  - †Sciurus niger
- Scolopax
  - †Scolopax hutchensi – type locality for species
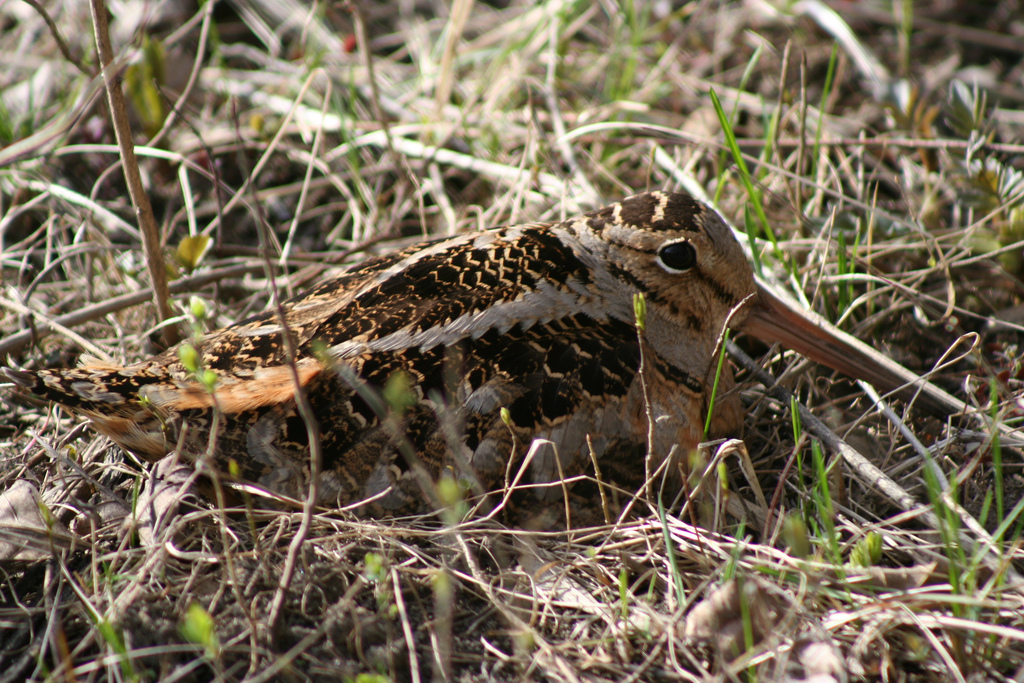
  - A living Scolopax minor, or American woodcock
    †Scolopax minor
- Scolymia
  - †Scolymia lacera
- Sconsia
  - †Sconsia hodgii
  - †Sconsia paralaevigata – type locality for species
  - †Sconsia prolongata
- Scrupocellaria
  - †Scrupocellaria gracilis
- †Scupocellaria
  - †Scupocellaria elliptica
  - †Scupocellaria gracilis
- †Scutella
  - †Scutella aberti
- Sedilia
  - †Sedilia aphanitoma
  - †Sedilia hoplophorus – or unidentified comparable form
  - †Sedilia ochoida – or unidentified comparable form
  - †Sedilia ochoidia
  - †Sedilia ondulum
  - †Sedilia sapa
  - †Sedilia transa
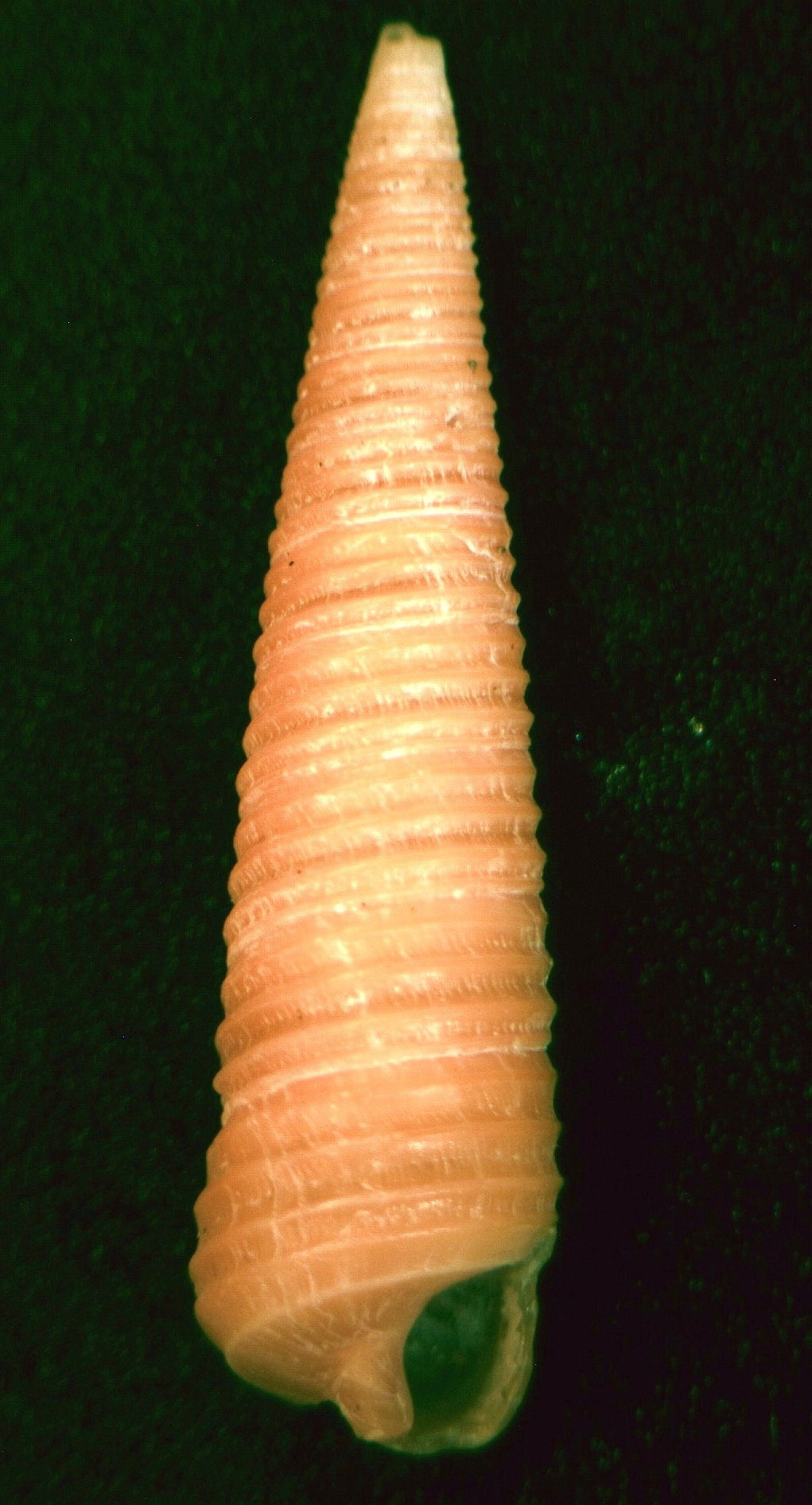
- Shell of a Seila sea snail
  Seila
  - †Seila adamsii
  - †Seila clavulus
- Semele
  - †Semele alumensis
  - †Semele alumrensis
  - †Semele bellastriata
  - †Semele carinata
  - †Semele chipolana
  - †Semele compacta
  - †Semele cytheroidea
  - †Semele ebllastriata
  - †Semele mutica
  - †Semele nuculoides
  - †Semele paramutica – type locality for species
  - †Semele perlamellosa
  - †Semele proficua
  - †Semele purpurascens
  - †Semele sardonica
  - †Semele scintillata
  - †Semele sellardsi
  - †Semele silicata
  - †Semele smithii
  - †Semele stearnsii
  - †Semele striulata
  - †Semele taracodes – type locality for species
- Semelina
  - †Semelina nuculoides
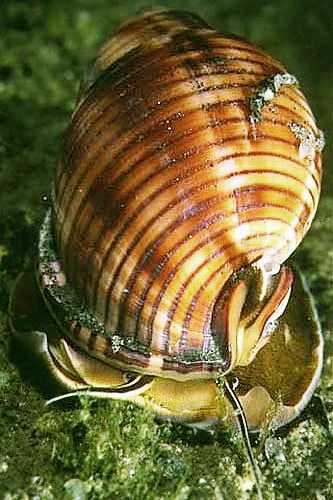
- A living Semicassis helmet sea snail
  Semicassis
  - †Semicassis aldrichi
  - †Semicassis granulata
- †Seminoleconus
  - †Seminoleconus diegelae
  - †Seminoleconus violetae
- †Septastrea
  - †Septastrea crassa
  - †Septastrea marylandica
  - †Septastrea matsoni
- †Seraphs
  - †Seraphs belemnitum – type locality for species
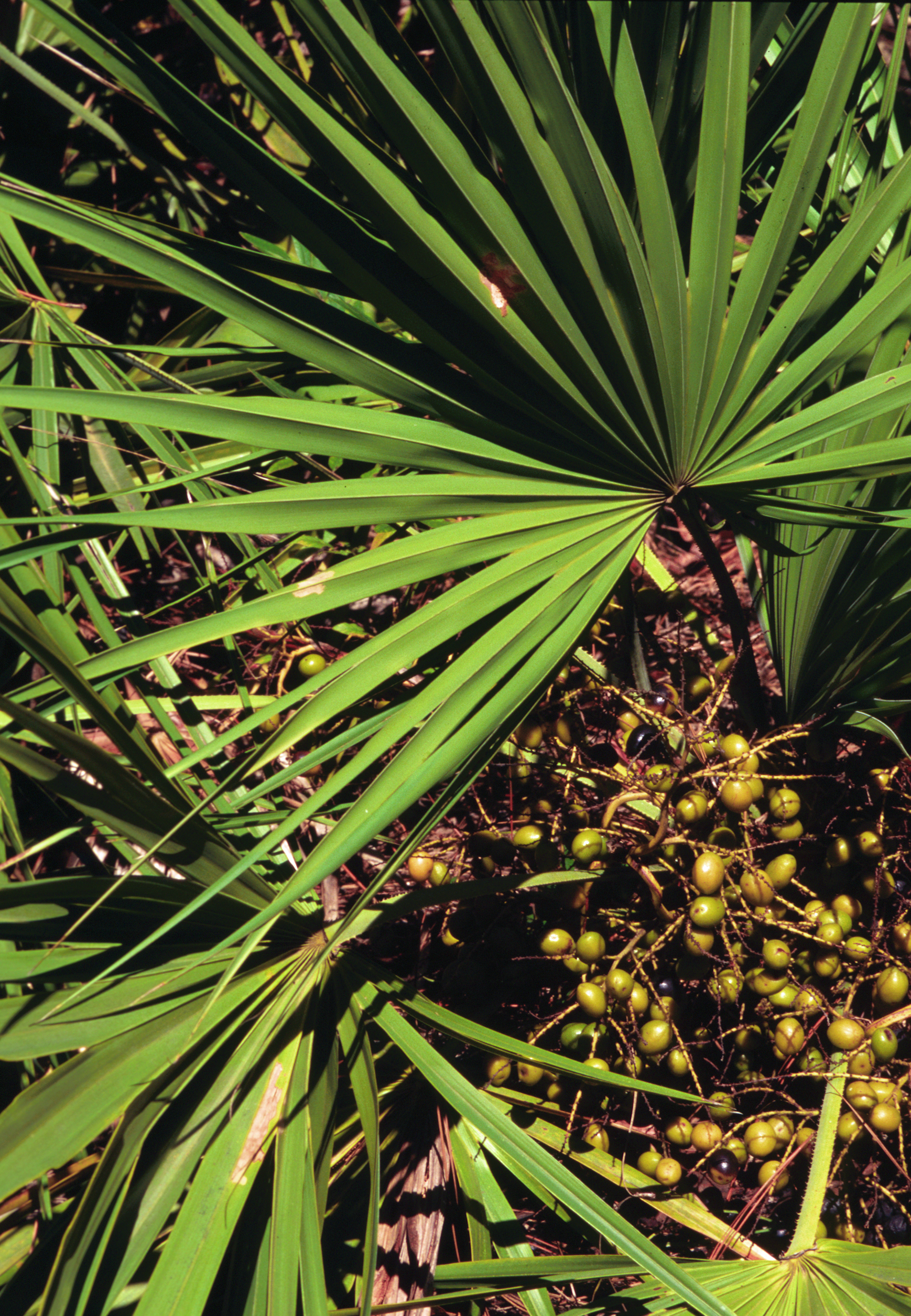
- Living Serenoa, or saw palmetto
  †Serenoa
  - †Serenoa serrulata
- Serpula
- Serpulorbis
  - †Serpulorbis ballistae
  - †Serpulorbis decussatus
  - †Serpulorbis granifera
  - †Serpulorbis papulosus
- Siderastrea
  - †Siderastrea banksi – type locality for species
  - †Siderastrea dalli
  - †Siderastrea hillsboroensis – type locality for species
  - †Siderastrea pliocenica
  - †Siderastrea radians
  - †Siderastrea siderea
  - †Siderastrea silecensis – type locality for species
- Sigatica
  - †Sigatica semisulcata
- Sigmodon
  - †Sigmodon bakeri – type locality for species
  - †Sigmodon curtisi
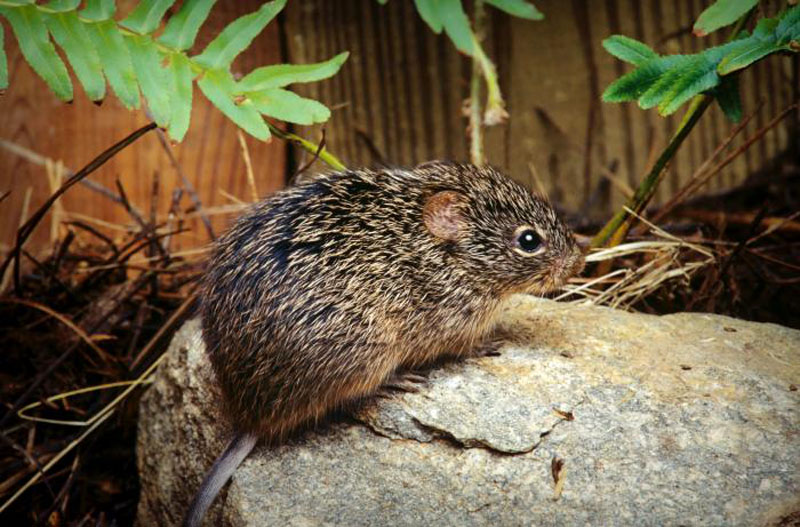
  - A living Sigmodon hispidus, or hispid cotton rat
    †Sigmodon hispidus
  - †Sigmodon libitinus
  - †Sigmodon minor
- Simnia
  - †Simnia terminatincta – type locality for species
- Simnialena
  - †Simnialena oryzagrana – type locality for species
- Sincola
  - †Sincola gunteri
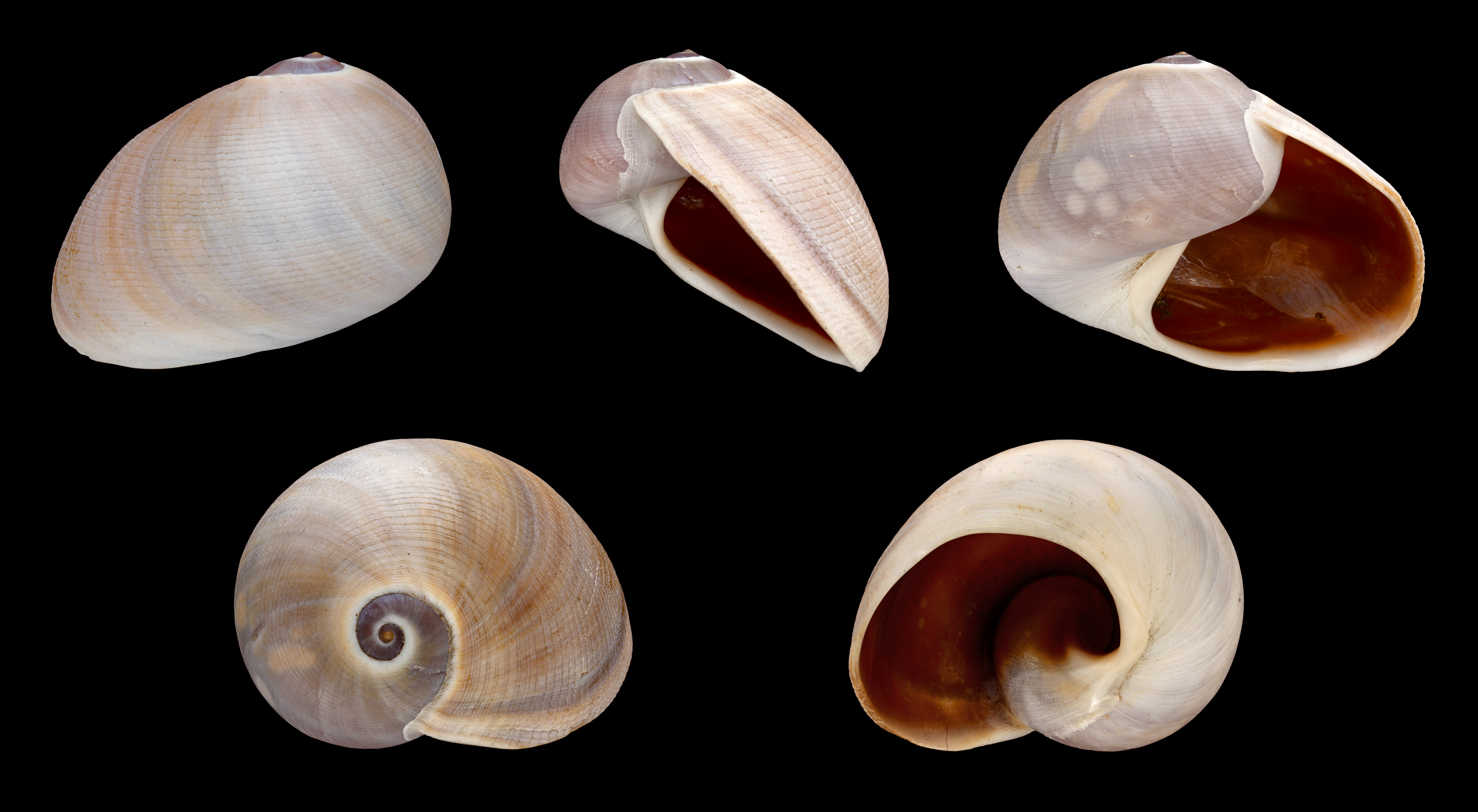
- Several views of the shell of a Sinum moon snail
  Sinum
  - †Sinum chipolanum
  - †Sinum dodoneum – type locality for species
  - †Sinum imperforatum
  - †Sinum mississippiensis
  - †Sinum multilineatum
  - †Sinum perspectivum
  - †Sinum polandi
  - †Sinum waltonense – type locality for species
- Siphocypraea
  - †Siphocypraea brantleyi
  - †Siphocypraea cannoni
  - †Siphocypraea carolinensis
  - †Siphocypraea dimasi
  - †Siphocypraea duerri
  - †Siphocypraea griffini
  - †Siphocypraea grovesi
  - †Siphocypraea metae
  - †Siphocypraea mulepenensis
  - †Siphocypraea philemoni
  - †Siphocypraea problematica
  - †Siphocypraea transitoria
  - †Siphocypraea trippeana
- Siphonochelus
  - †Siphonochelus linguiferus
  - †Siphonochelus siphonifera
- †Siren
  - †Siren hesterna – type locality for species
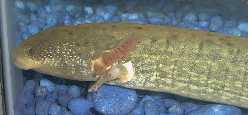
  - A living Siren lacertina, or greater siren
    †Siren lacertina
  - †Siren simpsoni – type locality for species
- Sistrurus
  - †Sistrurus miliarius
- Smaragdia
  - †Smaragdia chipolana
  - †Smaragdia grammica – type locality for species
  - †Smaragdia viridis
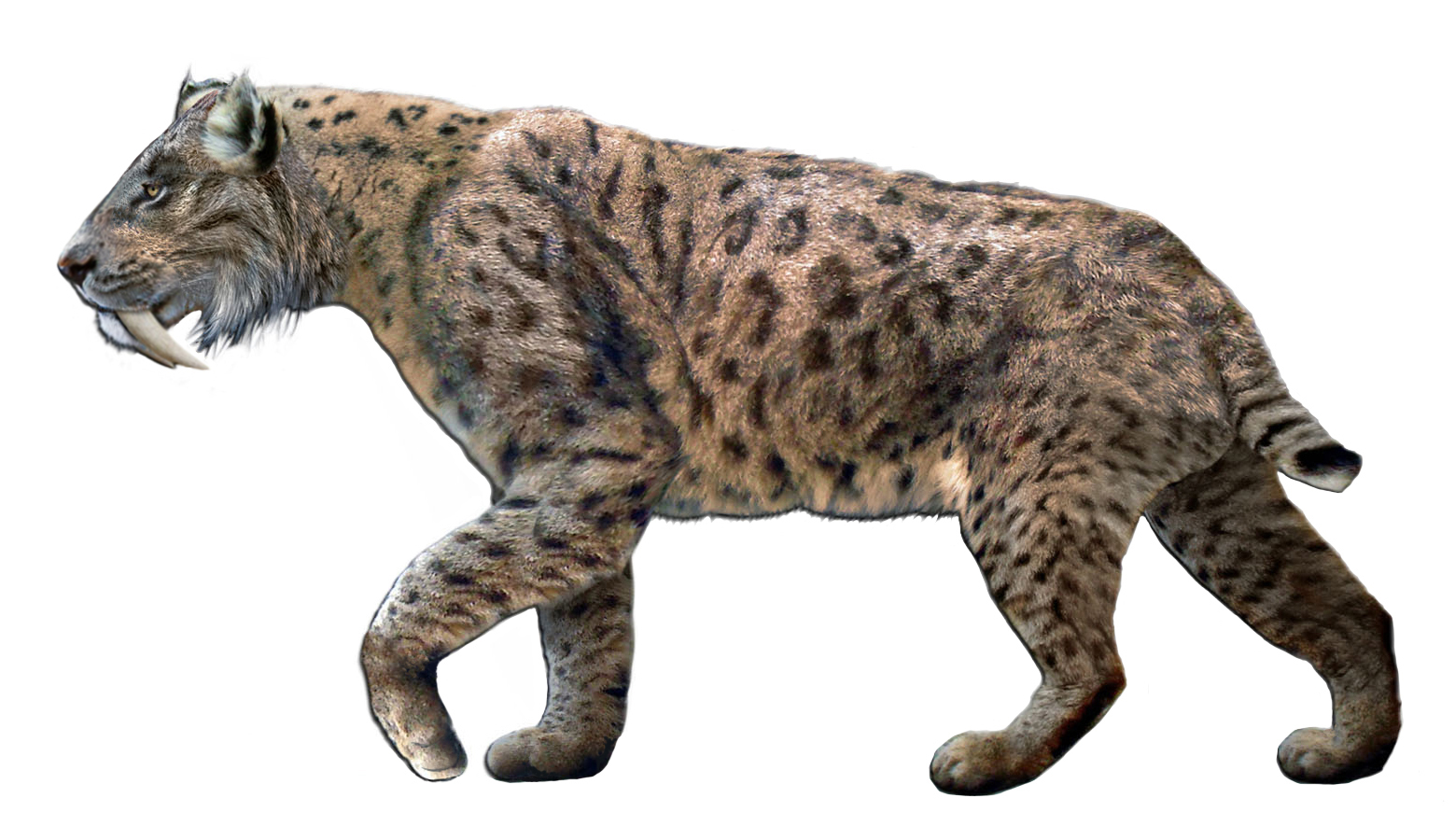
- Life restoration of the Pleistocene-Holocene saber-tooth cat Smilodon
  †Smilodon
  - †Smilodon fatalis
  - †Smilodon gracilis
- Smittina
  - †Smittina jacksonica
  - †Smittina portentosa
  - †Smittina strombecki
  - †Smittina telum
- Smittipora
  - †Smittipora elliptica
  - †Smittipora fusiformis
  - †Smittipora levigata
  - †Smittipora plicata
  - †Smittipora sagittellaria
  - †Smittipora tenuis
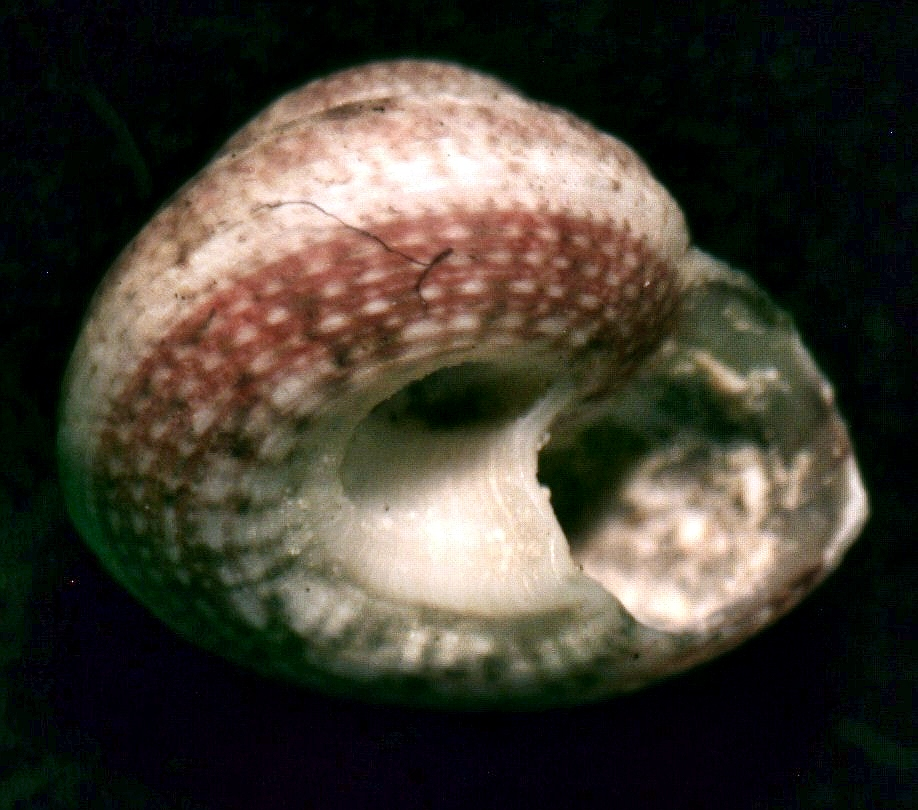
- Shell of a Solariella top sea snail
  Solariella
  - †Solariella laqua
  - †Solariella turritella
  - †Solariella vaughani
- Solariorbis
  - †Solariorbis blakei
  - †Solariorbis eugenes
  - †Solariorbis funiculus
  - †Solariorbis infracarinatus
  - †Solariorbis microforatis
  - †Solariorbis mooreanus
  - †Solariorbis opsitelotus
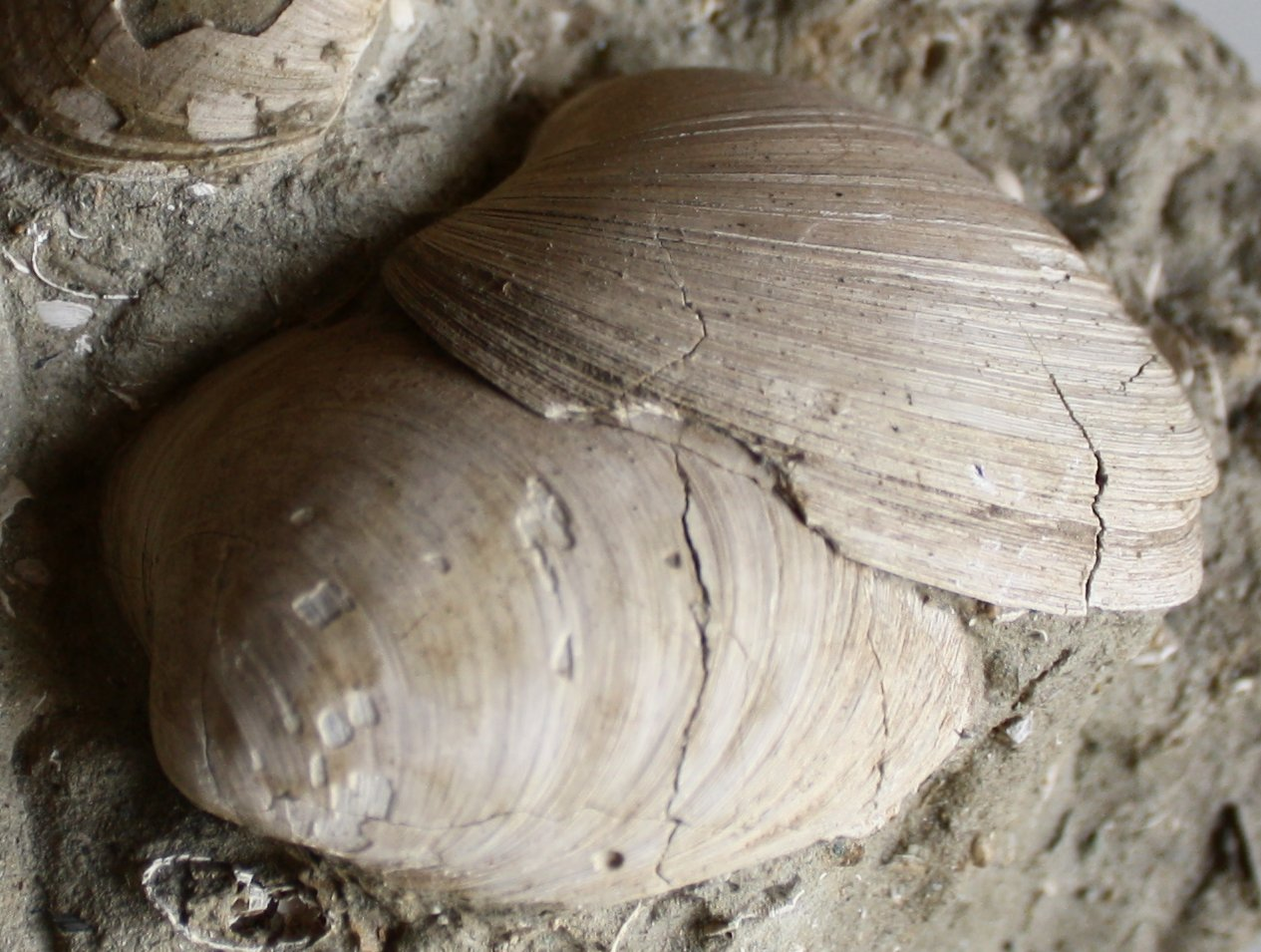
- Fossilized shells of the marine bivalve Solecurtus
  Solecurtus
  - †Solecurtus cumingianus
  - †Solecurtus sanctaemarthae
- Solen
  - †Solen amphistemma
- Solenastrea
  - †Solenastrea bournoni
  - †Solenastrea globosa
  - †Solenastrea hyades
- Solenosteira
  - †Solenosteira cancellaria
  - †Solenosteira mengeana
  - †Solenosteira mulepenensis
  - †Solenosteira suwanneensis
- †Solenosteria
  - †Solenosteria quinquespina
- Somateria
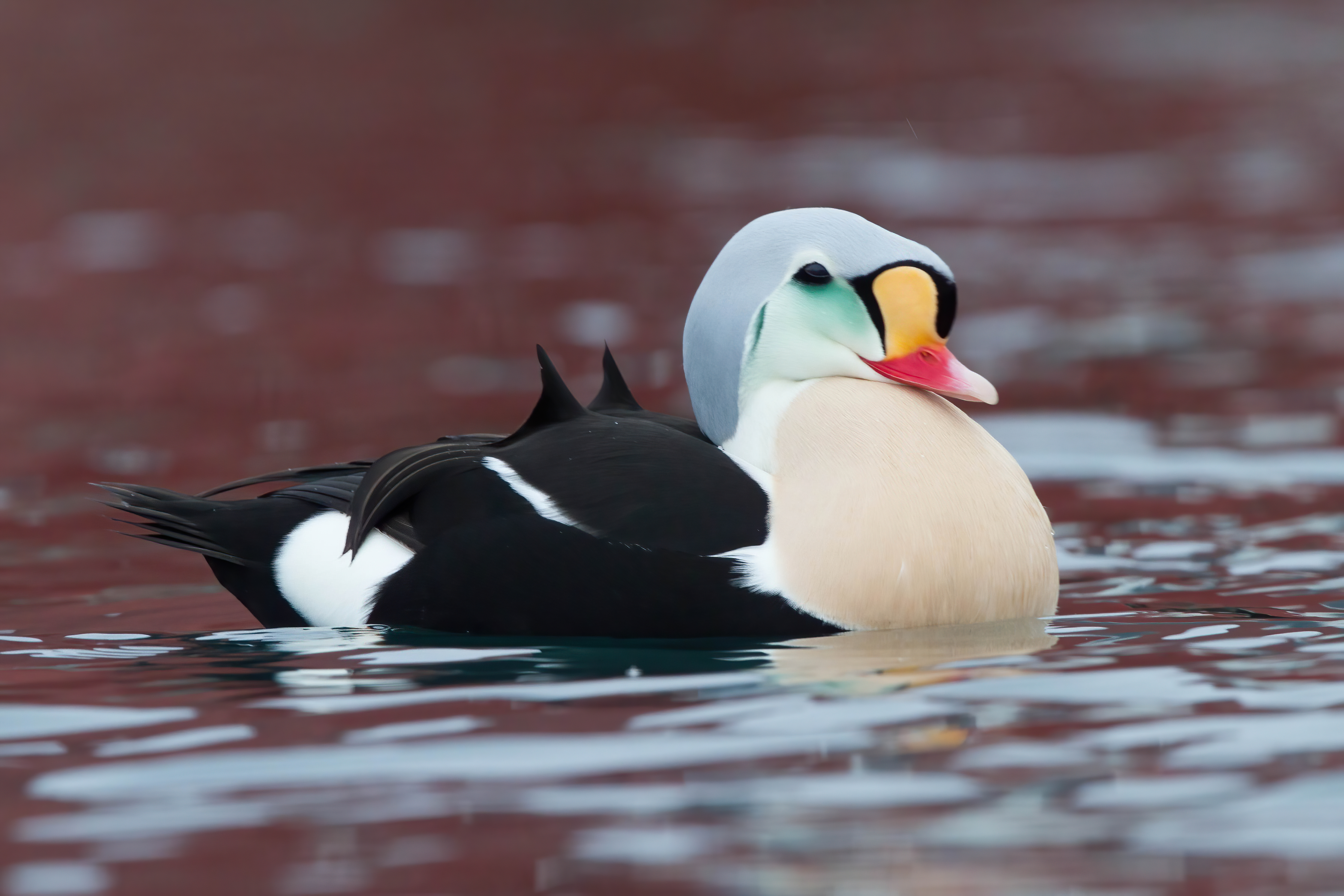
  - A living Somateria spectabilis, or king eider
    †Somateria spectabilis – or unidentified comparable form
- Sorex
  - †Sorex longirostris
- Sorites
  - †Sorites marginalis
- Spathochlamys
  - †Spathochlamys vaginula
- Spatula
  - †Spatula cylpeata
- Speotyto
  - †Speotyto cunicularia
- Spermophilus
- Sphaerogypsina
  - †Sphaerogypsina globula
- Sphenia
  - †Sphenia attenuata
  - †Sphenia tumida
- Spheniopsis
  - †Spheniopsis americana
- †Sphenophalos
  - †Sphenophalos garciae
- Sphyraena
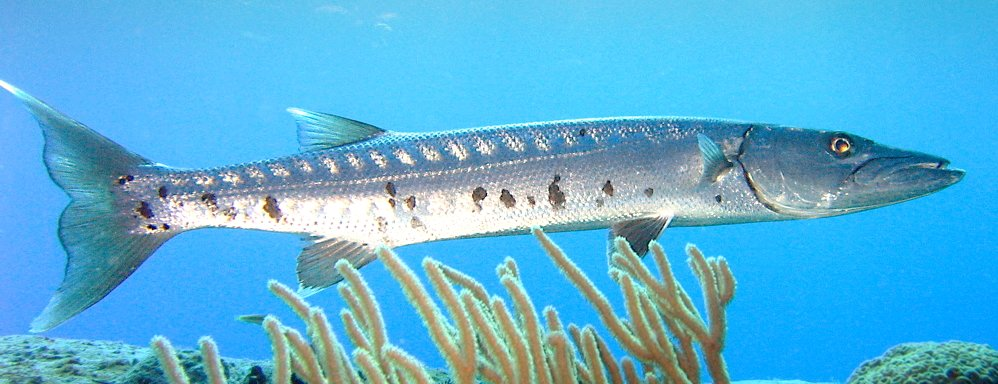
  - A living Sphyraena barracuda, or great barracuda
    †Sphyraena barracuda
- Sphyrna
- Spilogale
  - †Spilogale putorius
- †Spineoterebra
  - †Spineoterebra psilis
- †Spinifulgur
  - †Spinifulgur gemmulatum
- †Spiraxis – tentative report
  - †Spiraxis tampae
- Spiroloculina
  - †Spiroloculina dentata
  - †Spiroloculina reticulosa
- †Spirolplectamina
  - †Spirolplectamina barrowi – or unidentified comparable form
- Spirorbis
- Spisula
  - †Spisula craspedota – type locality for species
  - †Spisula incrassata
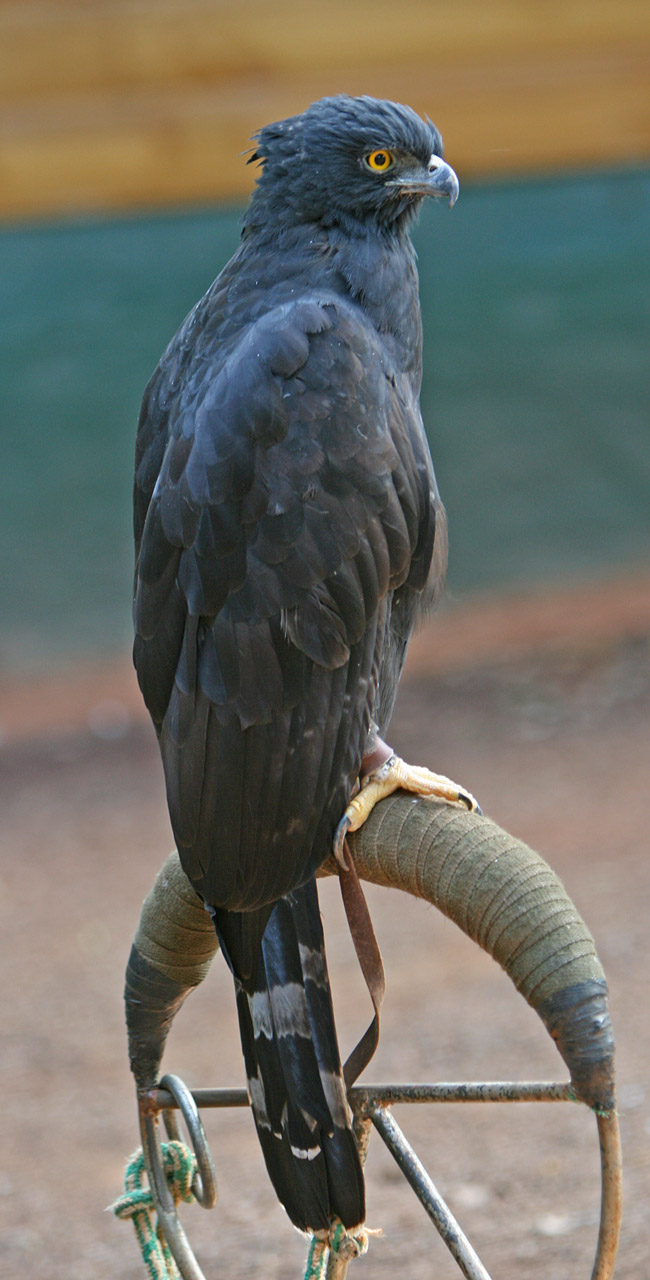
- A living Spizaetus, or typical hawk-eagle
  Spizaetus
  - †Spizaetus grinnelli
- Spizella
  - †Spizella passerina
  - †Spizella pusilla
- Splendrillia
- Spondylus
  - †Spondylus americanus
  - †Spondylus bostrychites
  - †Spondylus chipolanus
  - †Spondylus hollisteri
  - †Spondylus rotundatus
- Sportella
  - †Sportella constricta
  - †Sportella leura – type locality for species
  - †Sportella lioconcha
  - †Sportella lubrica
  - †Sportella obolus
  - †Sportella protexta
  - †Sportella unicarinata
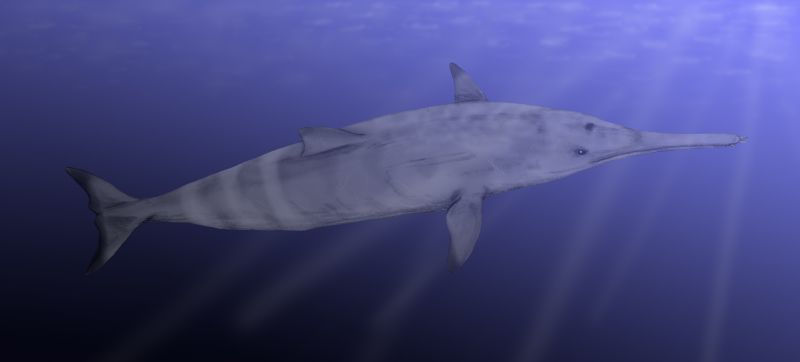
- Life restoration of the Oligocene-Miocene shark-toothed dolphin Squalodon
  †Squalodon – tentative report
- †Stamenocella
  - †Stamenocella grandis
  - †Stamenocella inferaviculifera
  - †Stamenocella mediaviculifera
- †Staminocella
  - †Staminocella inferaviculifera
- Steginoporella
  - †Steginoporella cellariiformis – type locality for species
  - †Steginoporella incrustans
  - †Steginoporella jacksonica
- †Stellifer
  - †Stellifer lanceolatus
- Stephanocoenia
  - †Stephanocoenia spongiformis
- Stercorarius
- Sternotherus
- Stewartia
  - †Stewartia anodonta
  - †Stewartia floridana
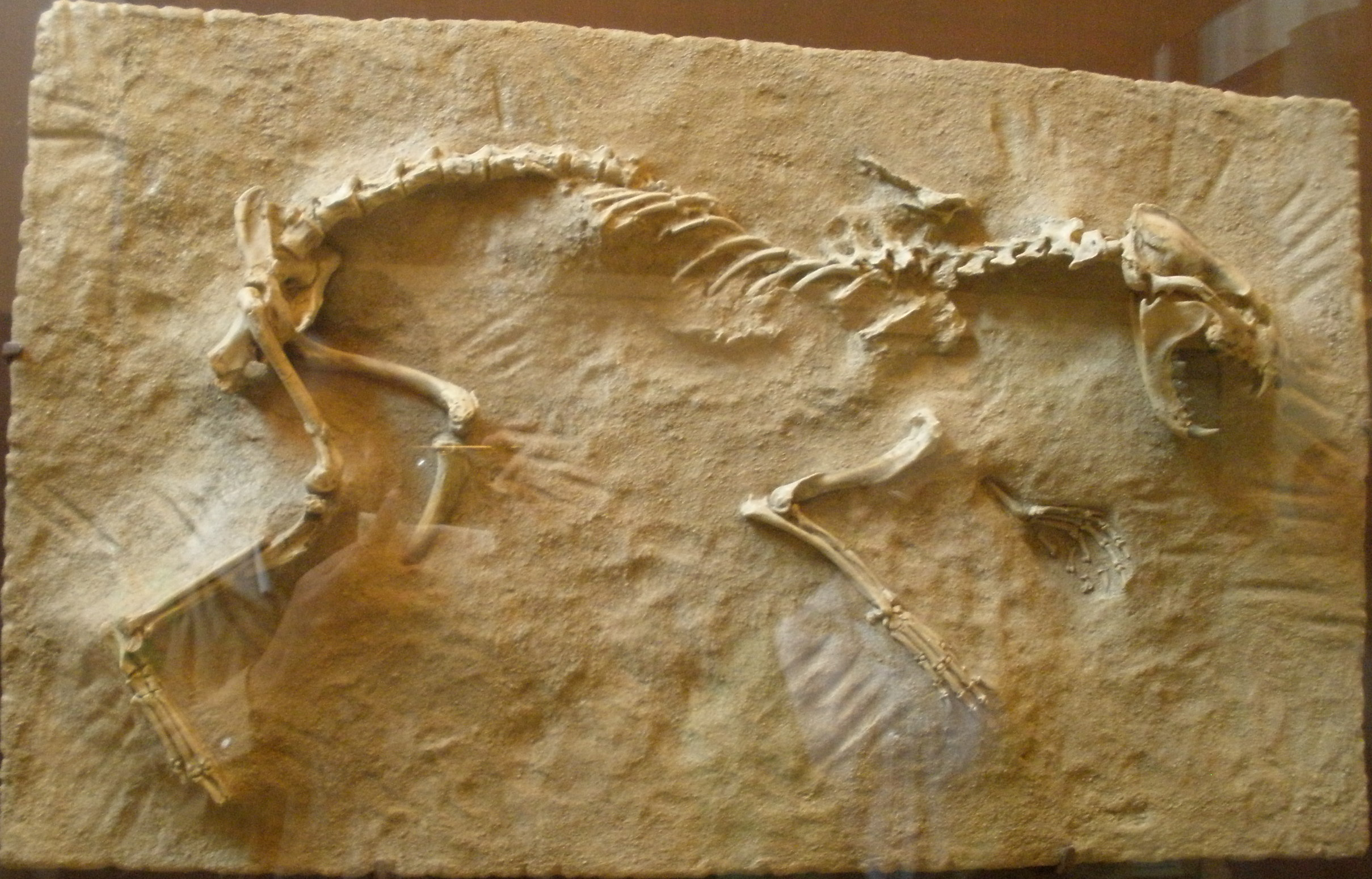
- Fossilized skeleton of the Miocene weasel Sthenictis
  Sthenictis
  - †Sthenictis lacota – or unidentified comparable form
- Stigmaulax
  - †Stigmaulax guppiana
  - †Stigmaulax guppiona
  - †Stigmaulax polypum
- Stilosoma
  - †Stilosoma vetustum – type locality for species
- Storeria
  - †Storeria dekayi
- †Stralopecten
  - †Stralopecten caloosaensis
  - †Stralopecten ernestsmithi
- Stramonita
  - †Stramonita haemostoma
  - †Stramonita penelaevis
  - †Stramonita sarasotana
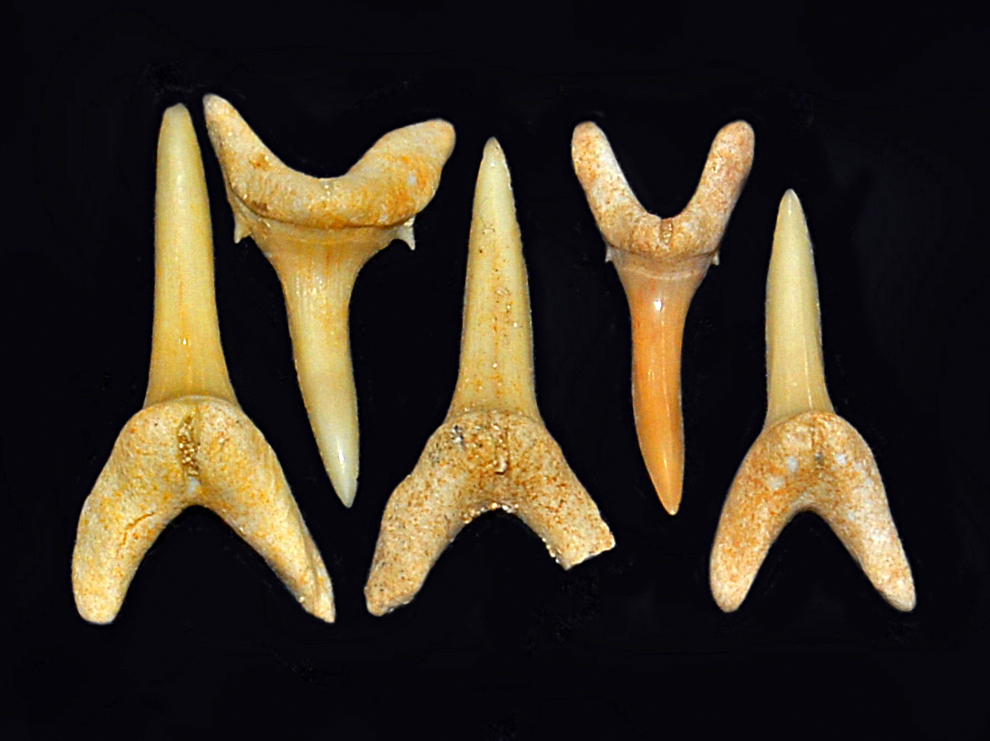
- Fossilized teeth of the Paleocene-Miocene sandshark Striatolamia
  †Striatolamia
  - †Striatolamia macrota
- Strigilla
  - †Strigilla mirabilis
  - †Strigilla paraflexuosa – type locality for species
  - †Strigilla sphaerion – type locality for species
- Strioterebrum
  - †Strioterebrum bipartitum
  - †Strioterebrum brightonensis
  - †Strioterebrum chipolana
  - †Strioterebrum concava
  - †Strioterebrum dislocata
  - †Strioterebrum dislocatum
  - †Strioterebrum eskata – type locality for species
  - †Strioterebrum eskatum
  - †Strioterebrum gausapatum
  - †Strioterebrum langdoni
  - †Strioterebrum onslowensis
  - †Strioterebrum petiti
  - †Strioterebrum psesta – type locality for species
  - †Strioterebrum psestum
  - †Strioterebrum pupiformis – type locality for species
  - †Strioterebrum rabdota – type locality for species
  - †Strioterebrum rabdotum
  - †Strioterebrum raptum – type locality for species
  - †Strioterebrum seminolum
  - †Strioterebrum spiriferum
  - †Strioterebrum vertebralis
  - †Strioterebrum vinosa
  - †Strioterebrum waltonense
  - †Strioterebrum waltonensis – type locality for species
- Strix
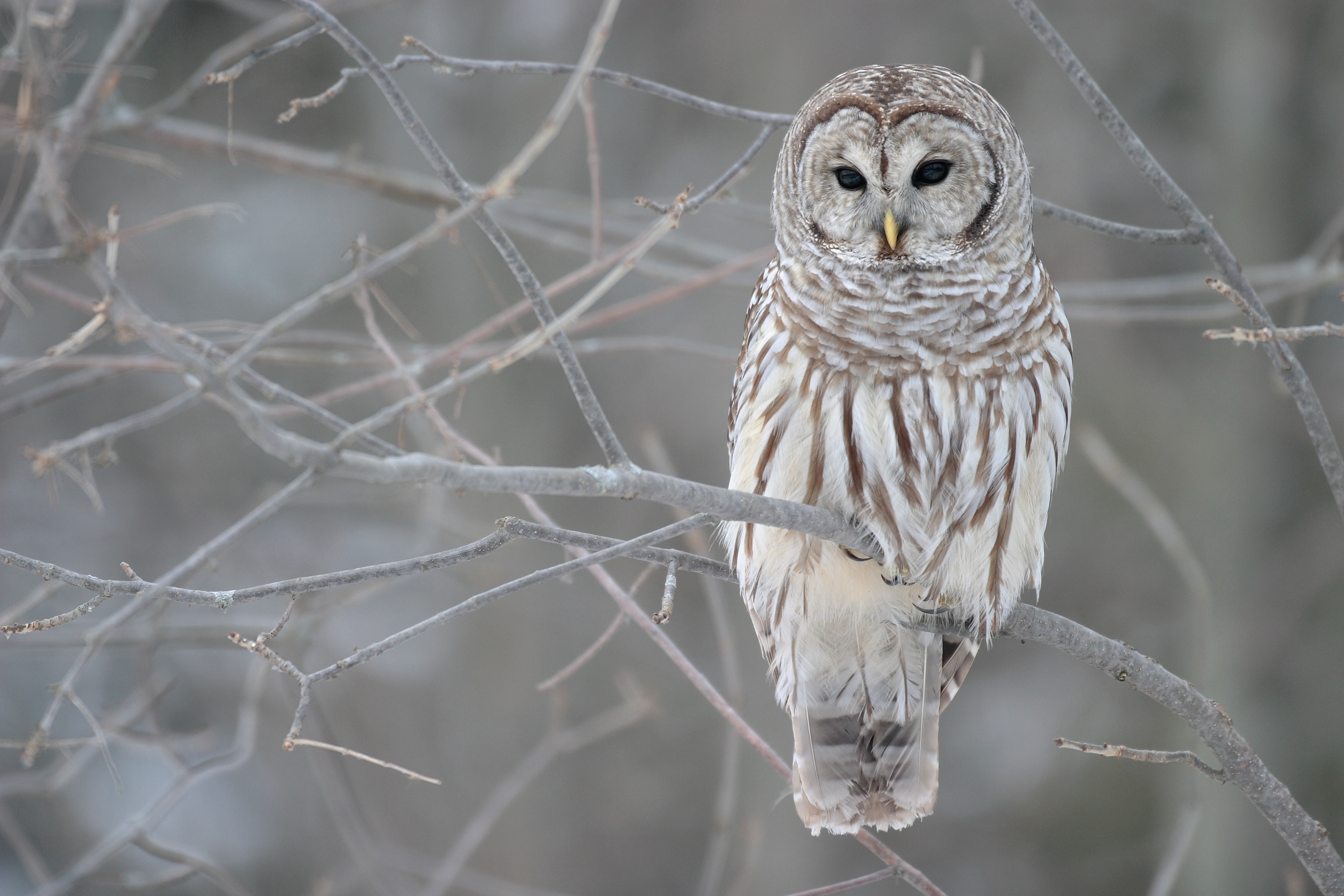
  - A living Strix varia, or barred owl
    †Strix varia
- Strobilops
  - †Strobilops hubbardi
  - †Strobilops texanianus
- Strombiformis
  - †Strombiformis dalli
  - †Strombiformis ischna – type locality for species
  - †Strombiformis leonensis
  - †Strombiformis scotti
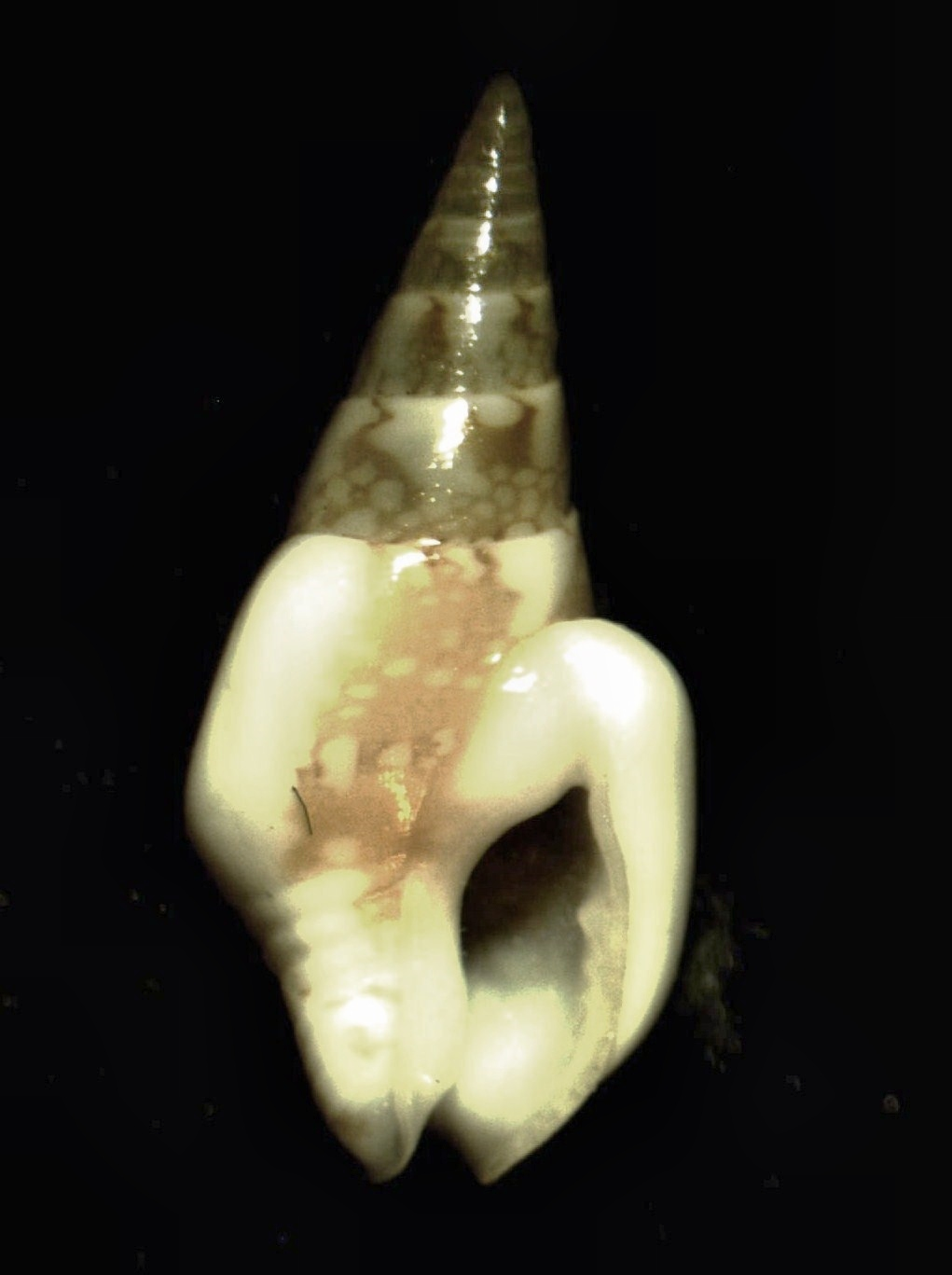
- Shell of a Strombina dove sea snail
  Strombina
  - †Strombina aldrichi
  - †Strombina ceryx – type locality for species
  - †Strombina gunteri
  - †Strombina lampra – type locality for species
  - †Strombina lissa – type locality for species
  - †Strombina margarita
  - †Strombina waltonia – type locality for species
  - †Strombina waltoniana
- †Strombinophos
  - †Strombinophos maxwelli
  - †Strombinophos vadosus – type locality for species
- Strombus
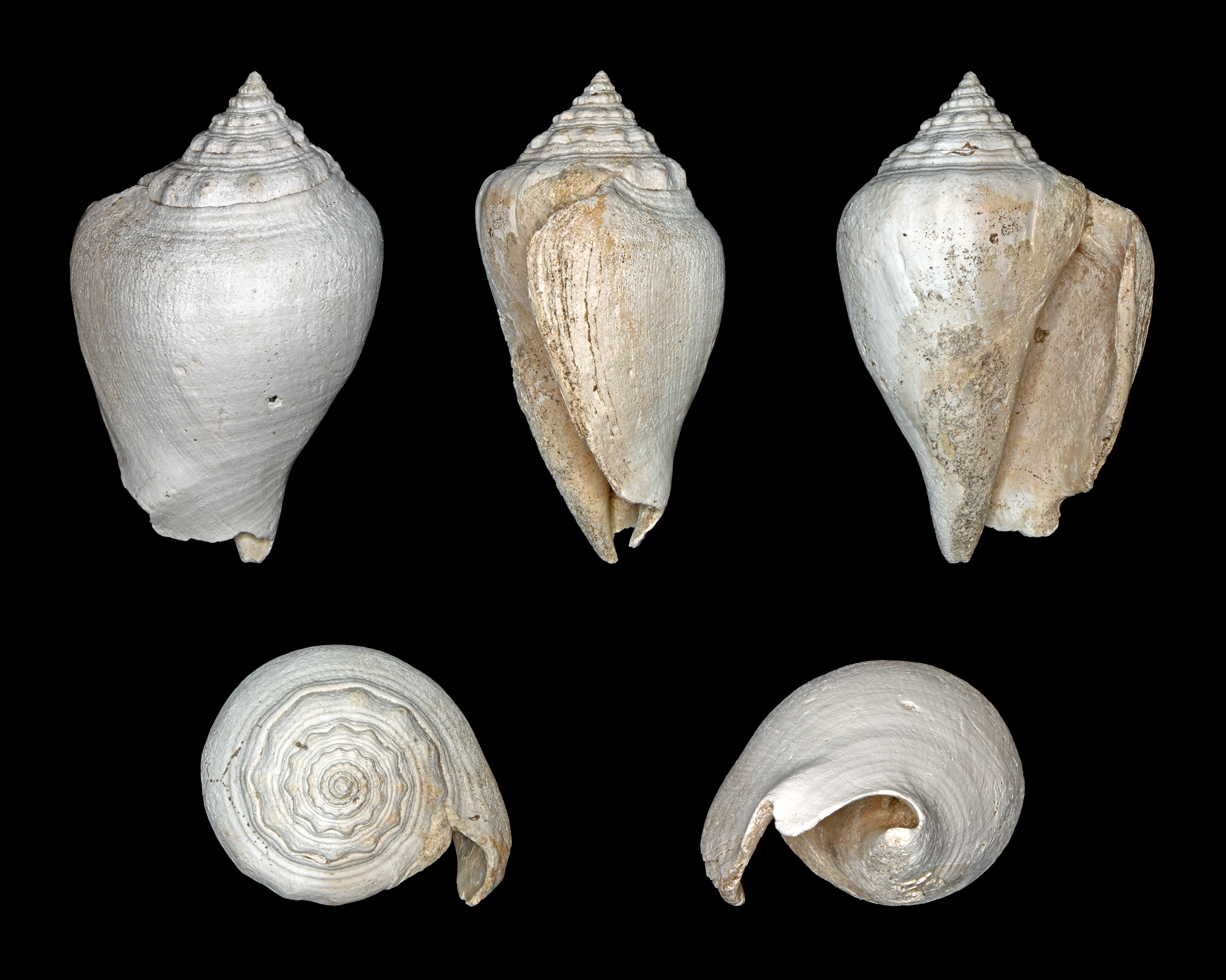
  - Fossilized shell in multiple views of a Strombus alatus, or Florida fighting conch
    †Strombus alatus
  - †Strombus brachior
  - †Strombus diegelae
  - †Strombus dodoneus – type locality for species
  - †Strombus dominator
  - †Strombus erici
  - †Strombus evergladensis
  - †Strombus floridanus
  - †Strombus hertweckorum
  - †Strombus holeylandicus
  - †Strombus jonesorum
  - †Strombus keatonorum
  - †Strombus leidyi
  - †Strombus lindae
  - †Strombus liocyclus
  - †Strombus mayacensis
  - †Strombus pugilis
  - †Strombus raninus
  - †Strombus scotti
- Sturnella
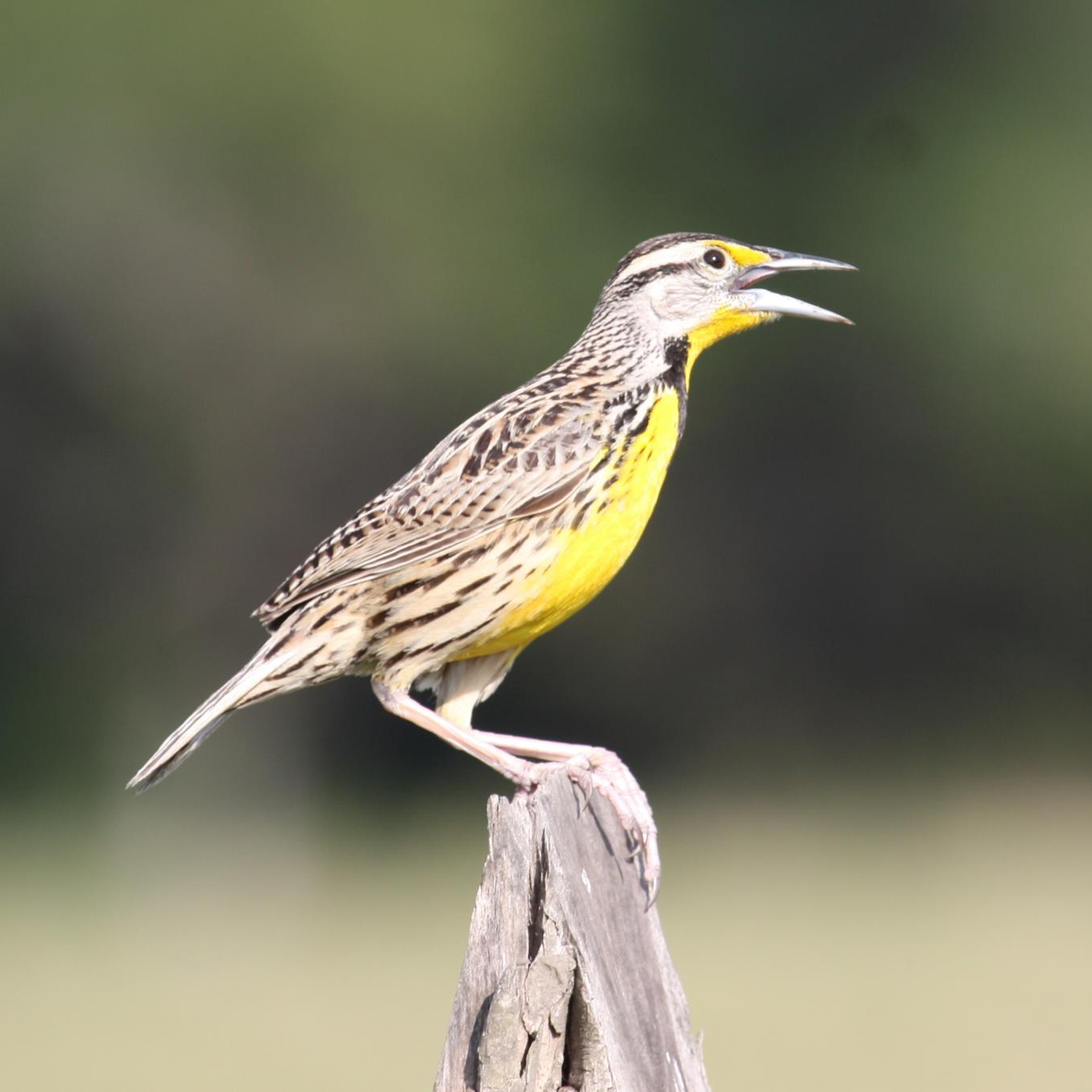
  - A living Sturnella magna, or eastern meadowlark
    †Sturnella magna
- †Stylocoenia
  - †Stylocoenia pumpellyi – or unidentified comparable form
- Stylophora
  - †Stylophora affinis
  - †Stylophora granulata
  - †Stylophora imperatoris
  - †Stylophora minor
  - †Stylophora minutissima
  - †Stylophora undata – type locality for species
- †Suaptenos – type locality for genus
  - †Suaptenos whitei – type locality for species
- †Subantilocapra
  - †Subantilocapra garciae
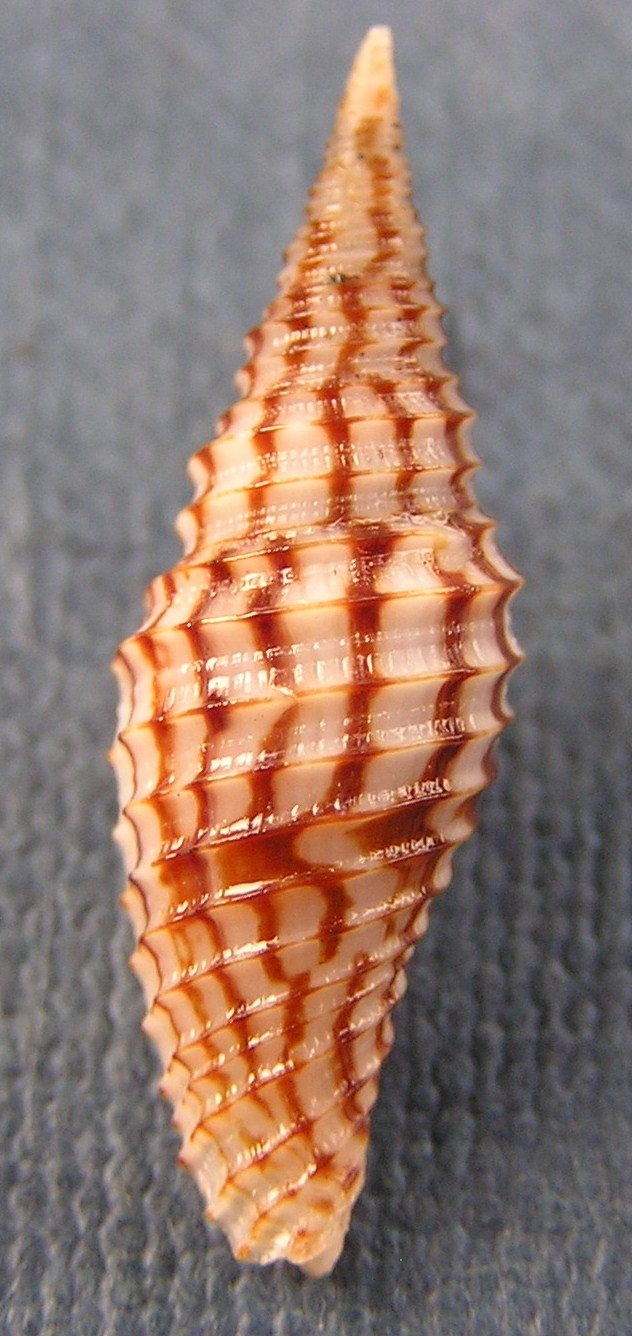
- Shell of a Subcancilla sea snail
  Subcancilla
  - †Subcancilla compsa
- Sula
  - †Sula guano – type locality for species
  - †Sula phosphata – type locality for species
  - †Sula universitatis – type locality for species
- Sulcoretusa
  - †Sulcoretusa chipolana
  - †Sulcoretusa prosulcata
- †Sulcularia
  - †Sulcularia chipolana
  - †Sulcularia prosulcata – type locality for species
  - †Sulcularia sulcata
- †Superlucina
  - †Superlucina megameris
- †Suwannescapha
  - †Suwannescapha lindae
- †Sycospira – type locality for genus
  - †Sycospira eocenica – type locality for species
  - †Sycospira eocensis
- †Syllomus – or unidentified comparable form
- Sylvilagus
  - †Sylvilagus floridanus
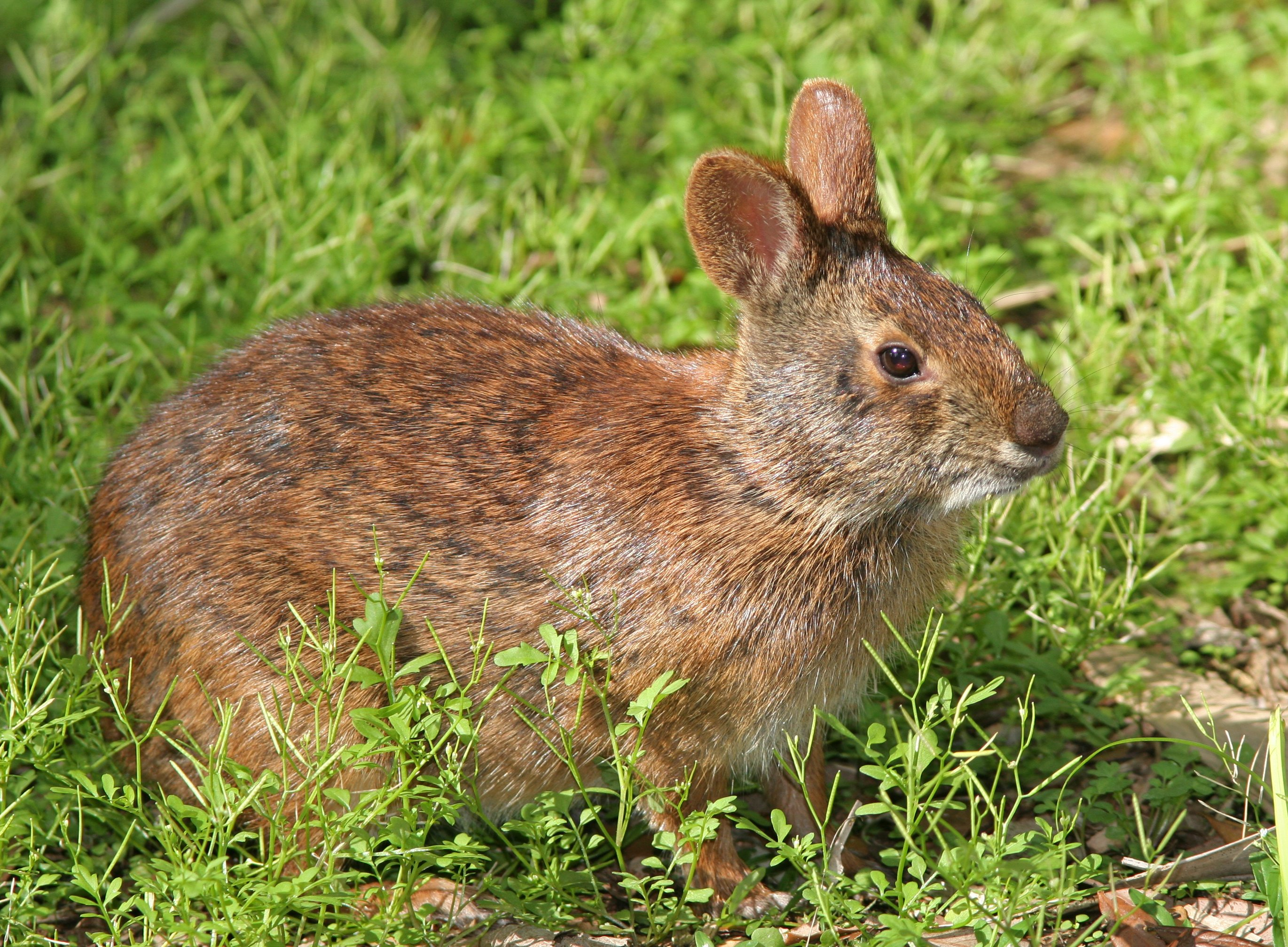
  - A living Sylvilagus palustris, or marsh rabbit
    †Sylvilagus palustris
  - †Sylvilagus webbi – type locality for species
- †Symbiangia – type locality for genus
  - †Symbiangia vaughani – type locality for species
- Synaptomys
  - †Synaptomys australis
  - †Synaptomys morgani – type locality for species
- Syncera
  - †Syncera microgaza – type locality for species
- Synodus
  - †Synodus foetens – or unidentified comparable form
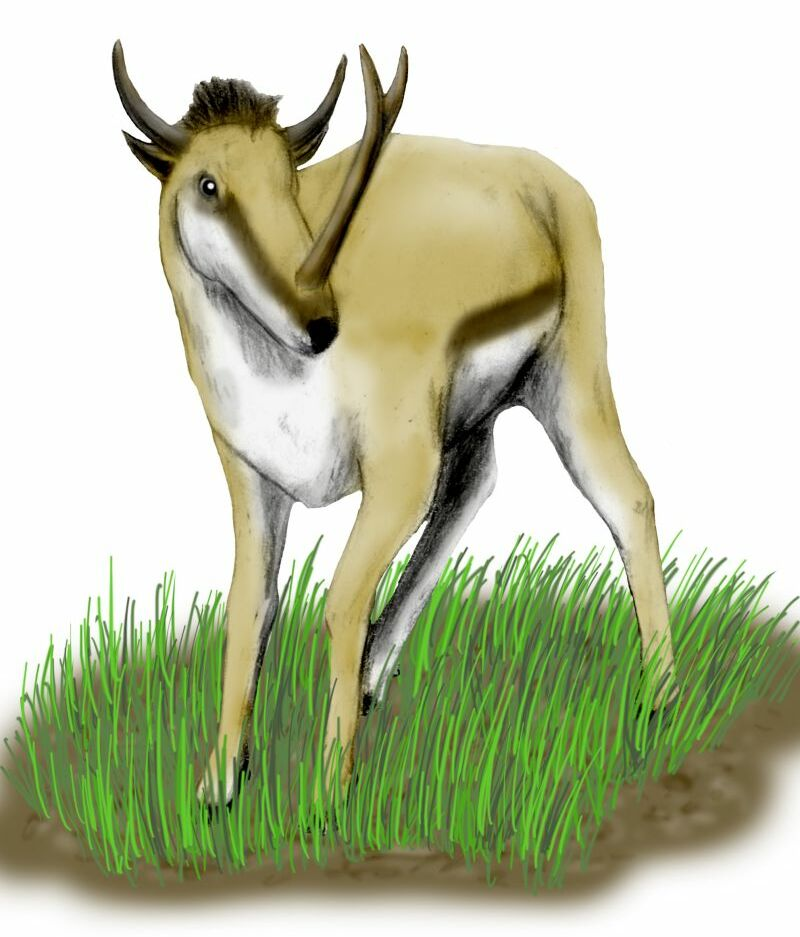
- Life restoration of the Miocene even-toed ungulate Synthetoceras
  †Synthetoceras
  - †Synthetoceras tricornatus – or unidentified comparable form
- Syntomodrillia
  - †Syntomodrillia glyphostoma
  - †Syntomodrillia newmani
  - †Syntomodrillia scissurata
  - †Syntomodrillia spica
  - †Syntomodrillia tecla
- Syrnola
- †Syzygophyllia
  - †Syzygophyllia dentata
  - †Syzygophyllia tampae – type locality for species

== T ==
- Tachybaptus
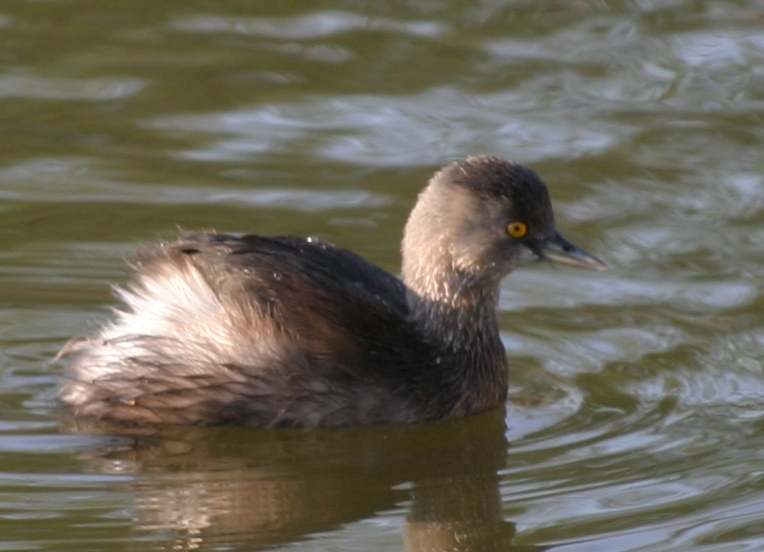
  - A living Tachybaptus dominicus, or least grebe
    †Tachybaptus dominicus
- Tachycineta
  - †Tachycineta speleodytes
- Tadarida
  - †Tadarida brasiliensis
- †Tagassu
  - †Tagassu tetragonus – or unidentified comparable form
- Tagelus
  - †Tagelus divisus
- Talityphis
  - †Talityphis pterinus
- Talparia
  - †Talparia mariaelisabethae – type locality for species
- Tamias
  - †Tamias aristus
- Tamiosoma
  - †Tamiosoma advena – type locality for species
- Tantilla
  - †Tantilla coronata
- †Taphophoyx – type locality for genus
  - †Taphophoyx hodgei – type locality for species
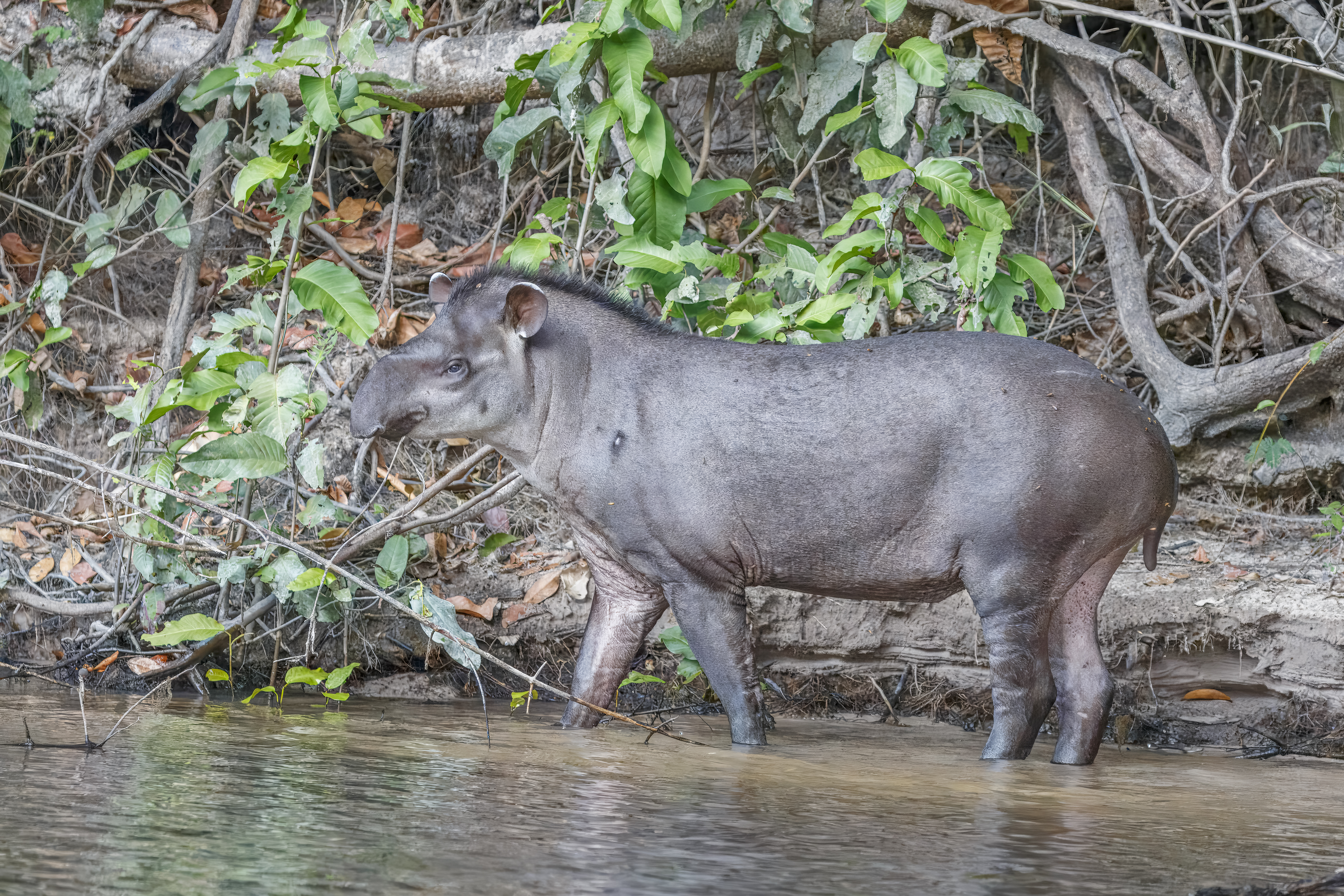
- A living Tapirus, or tapir
  Tapirus
  - †Tapirus haysii
  - †Tapirus lundeliusi – type locality for species
  - †Tapirus polkensis
  - †Tapirus veroensis
  - †Tapirus webbi – type locality for species
- Taras
  - †Taras nucleiformis
- †Taxocardia
  - †Taxocardia floridana
- Taxodium
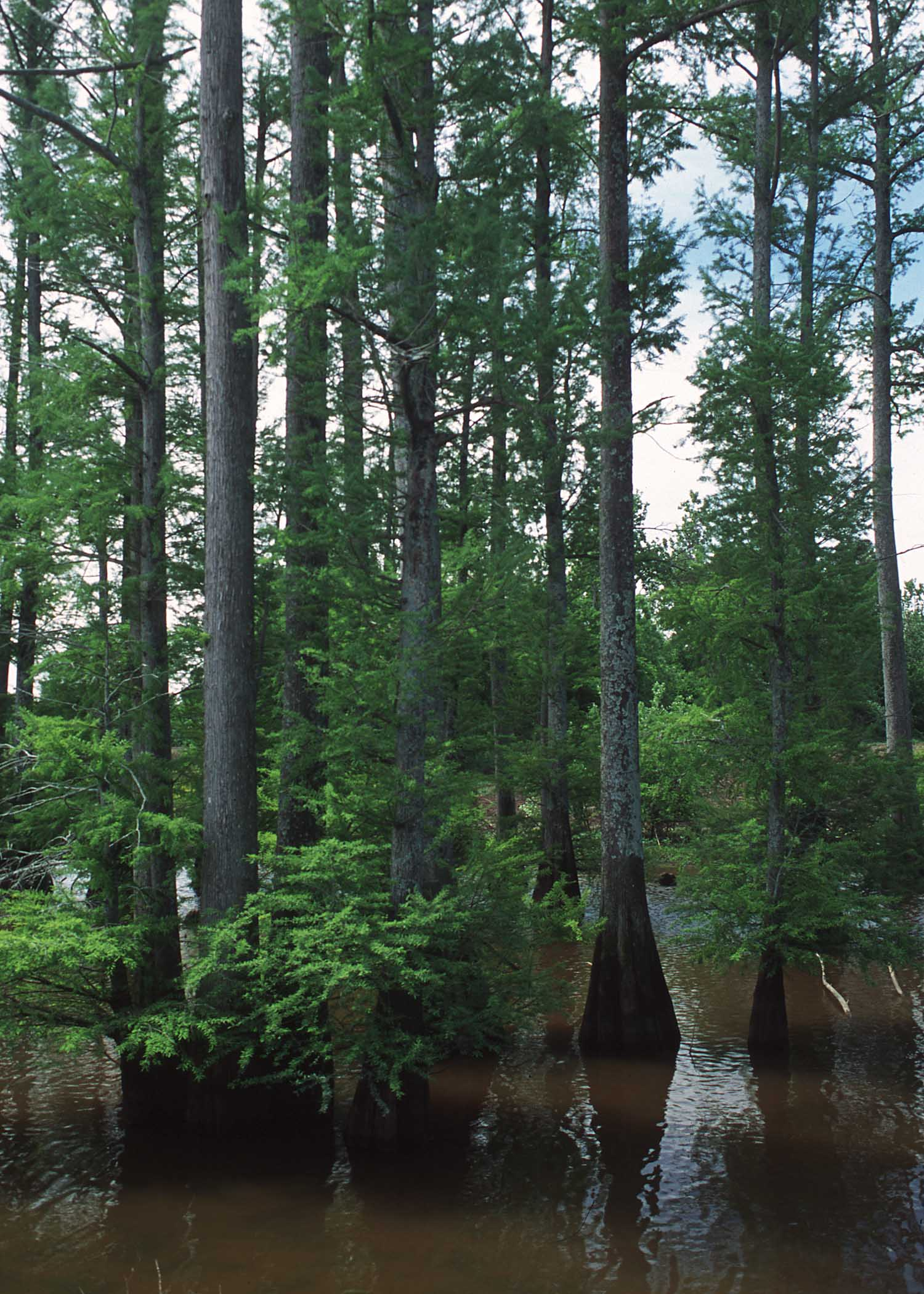
  - Living Taxodium distichum, or bald cypresses
    †Taxodium distichum
- †Tectariopsis – tentative report
  - †Tectariopsis avonensis – type locality for species
- Tectonatica
  - †Tectonatica floridana
  - †Tectonatica mino – type locality for species
  - †Tectonatica platabasis – type locality for species
  - †Tectonatica pusilla
  - †Tectonatica semen – type locality for species
- Tegula
  - †Tegula calusa
  - †Tegula exoleta
  - †Tegula exoluta
  - †Tegula fasciata
  - †Tegula fasciatum
  - †Tegula lindae
- Teinostoma
  - †Teinostoma altum
  - †Teinostoma avunculus
  - †Teinostoma biscaynense
  - †Teinostoma calliglyptum
  - †Teinostoma caloosaense
  - †Teinostoma carincallus
  - †Teinostoma carinicallus
  - †Teinostoma chipolanum
  - †Teinostoma cocolitoris – or unidentified comparable form
  - †Teinostoma goniogyrus
  - †Teinostoma harveyensis
  - †Teinostoma mekon – type locality for species
  - †Teinostoma milium
  - †Teinostoma nana
  - †Teinostoma parvicallum
  - †Teinostoma phacoton – type locality for species
  - †Teinostoma tectispira
  - †Teinostoma umbilicatum
  - †Teinostoma washingtonensis
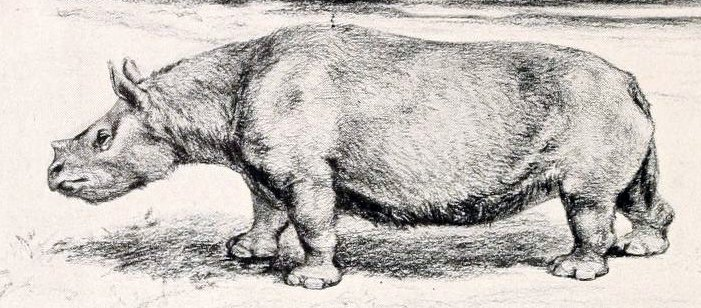
- Restoration of the Miocene-Pliocene rhinoceros Teleoceras
  †Teleoceras
  - †Teleoceras hicksi
  - †Teleoceras proterum
- Telescopium
  - †Telescopium blackwaterensis
  - †Telescopium hernandoensis
- Tellidora
  - †Tellidora cristata
  - †Tellidora lunulata
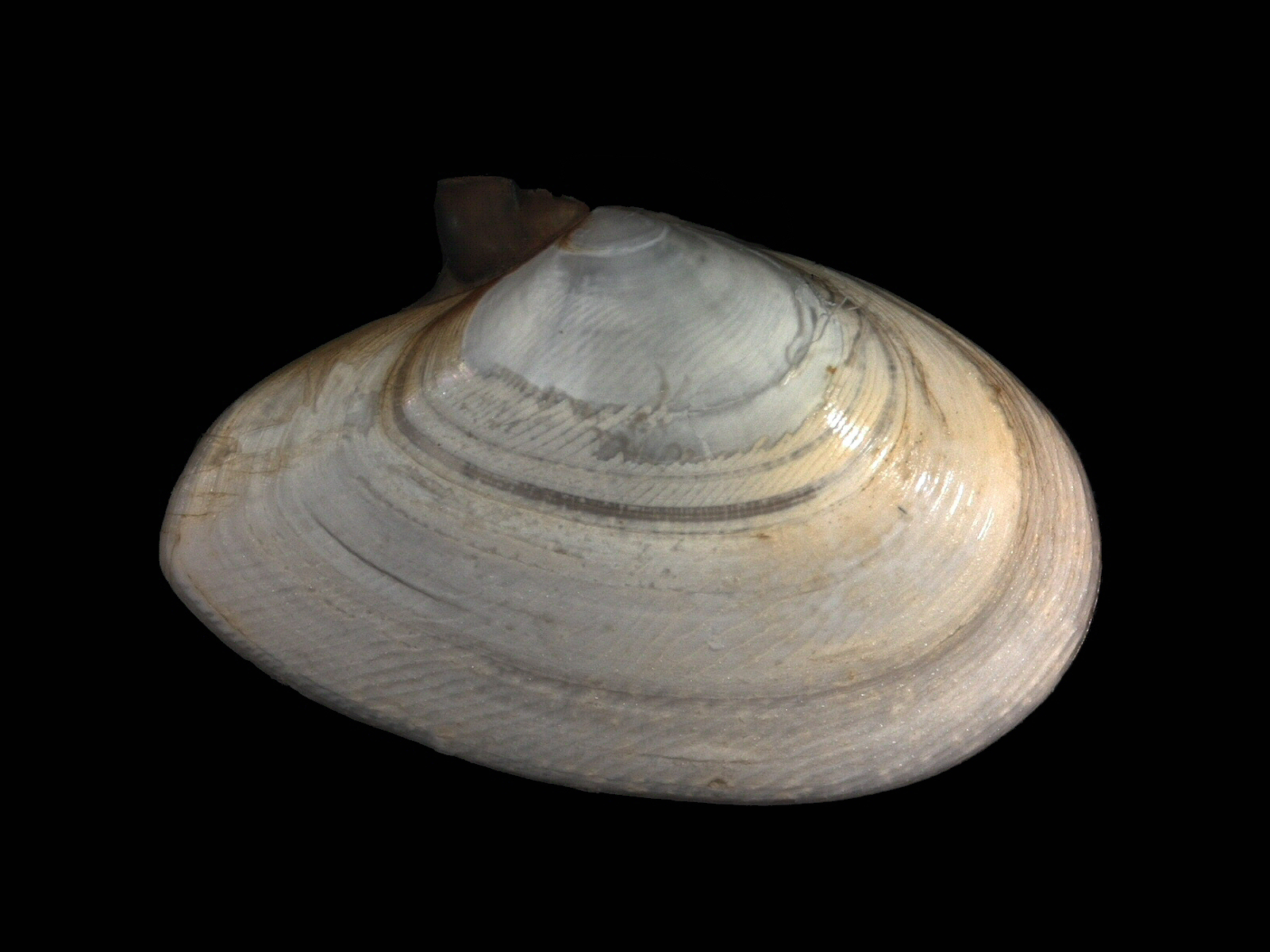
- Shell of a Tellina, or tellin
  Tellina
  - †Tellina acalypta
  - †Tellina acalyptya
  - †Tellina acloneta
  - †Tellina acosmita
  - †Tellina agria
  - †Tellina atossa
  - †Tellina calligypta
  - †Tellina chipolana
  - †Tellina cloneta
  - †Tellina ctenota – type locality for species
  - †Tellina dinomera – or unidentified comparable form
  - †Tellina dira
  - †Tellina dodona
  - †Tellina georgiana
  - †Tellina hypolispa
  - †Tellina lampra
  - †Tellina leptalea – type locality for species
  - †Tellina lintea
  - †Tellina macilenta
  - †Tellina merula
  - †Tellina mexicana
  - †Tellina piesa – type locality for species
  - †Tellina segregata
  - †Tellina silicata
  - †Tellina similis
  - †Tellina strophia
  - †Tellina subaritica
  - †Tellina suberis
  - †Tellina sybaritica
  - †Tellina waltonensis – type locality for species
- †Temblornia
  - †Temblornia virgata – type locality for species
- Tenagodus
  - †Tenagodus tampensis
- †Tenuicerithium
  - †Tenuicerithium absonum – type locality for species
  - †Tenuicerithium ascensum – type locality for species
  - †Tenuicerithium permutabile
- †Tephrocyon
  - †Tephrocyon scitulus
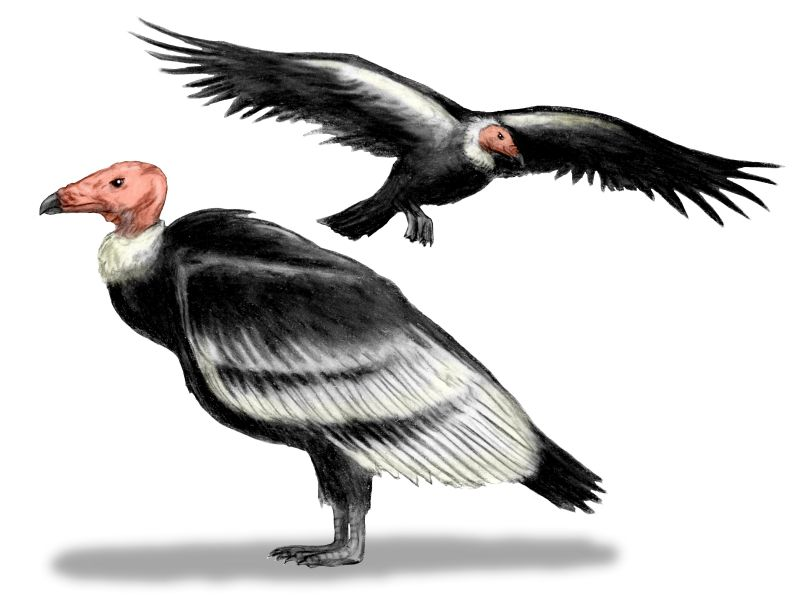
- Life restoration of the Pleistocene bird of prey Teratornis
  †Teratornis
  - †Teratornis merriami
- Terebellum
  - †Terebellum hernandoenis – tentative report
  - †Terebellum hernandoensis
- Terebra
  - †Terebra aclinica
  - †Terebra aulakoessa – type locality for species
  - †Terebra ballista
  - †Terebra binodosa
  - †Terebra bipartita
  - Shell in multiple views of a Terebra dislocata, or eastern auger sea snail
    †Terebra dislocata
  - †Terebra divisura
  - †Terebra hunterae
  - †Terebra odopoia – type locality for species
  - †Terebra protexta
  - †Terebra sulcifera
  - †Terebra unilineata
- †Terebraspira
  - †Terebraspira calusa
  - †Terebraspira cronleyensis
  - †Terebraspira diegelae
  - †Terebraspira kissimmeensis
  - †Terebraspira labellensis
  - †Terebraspira lindae
  - †Terebraspira maryae
  - †Terebraspira okeechobeensis
  - †Terebraspira osceolari
  - †Terebraspira scalarina
  - †Terebraspira seminole
  - †Terebraspira sparrowi
- Terebratalia
  - †Terebratalia dentilabris
- Terebratulina
  - †Terebratulina lachryma
- Teredo
- Terrapene
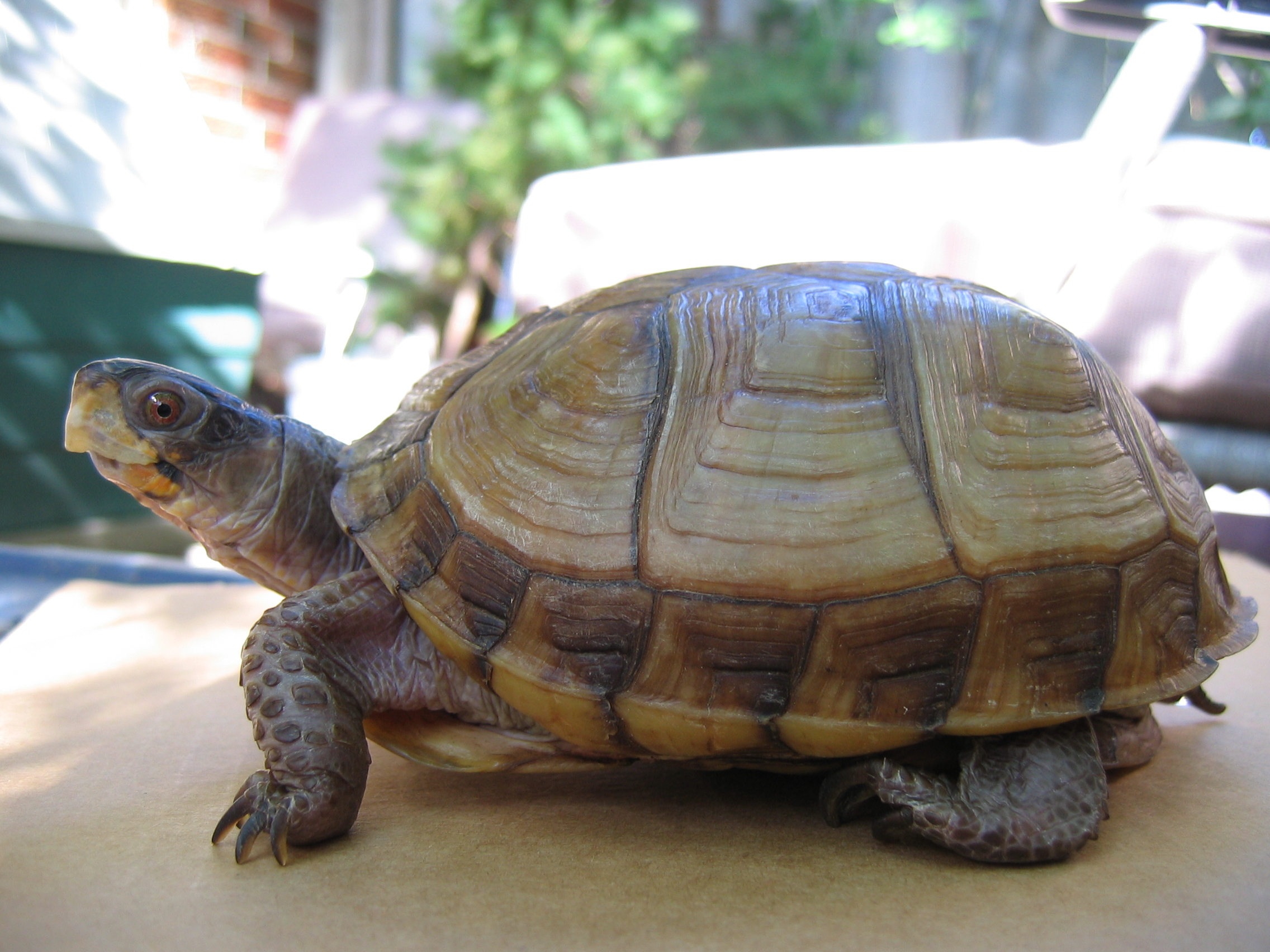
  - A living Terrapene carolina, or common box turtle
    †Terrapene carolina
- Tesseracme
  - †Tesseracme caloosaense
  - †Tesseracme prisma
- Testudo
- Tetraplaria
  - †Tetraplaria petila – type locality for species
  - †Tetraplaria tuberculata
- †Texomys
- Textularia
  - †Textularia articulata
  - †Textularia candeiana
  - †Textularia mayori
- Thalamoporella
- Thalassia
  - †Thalassia syringodium
  - †Thalassia testudinum
- †Thalassites – type locality for genus
  - †Thalassites parkavonensis – type locality for species
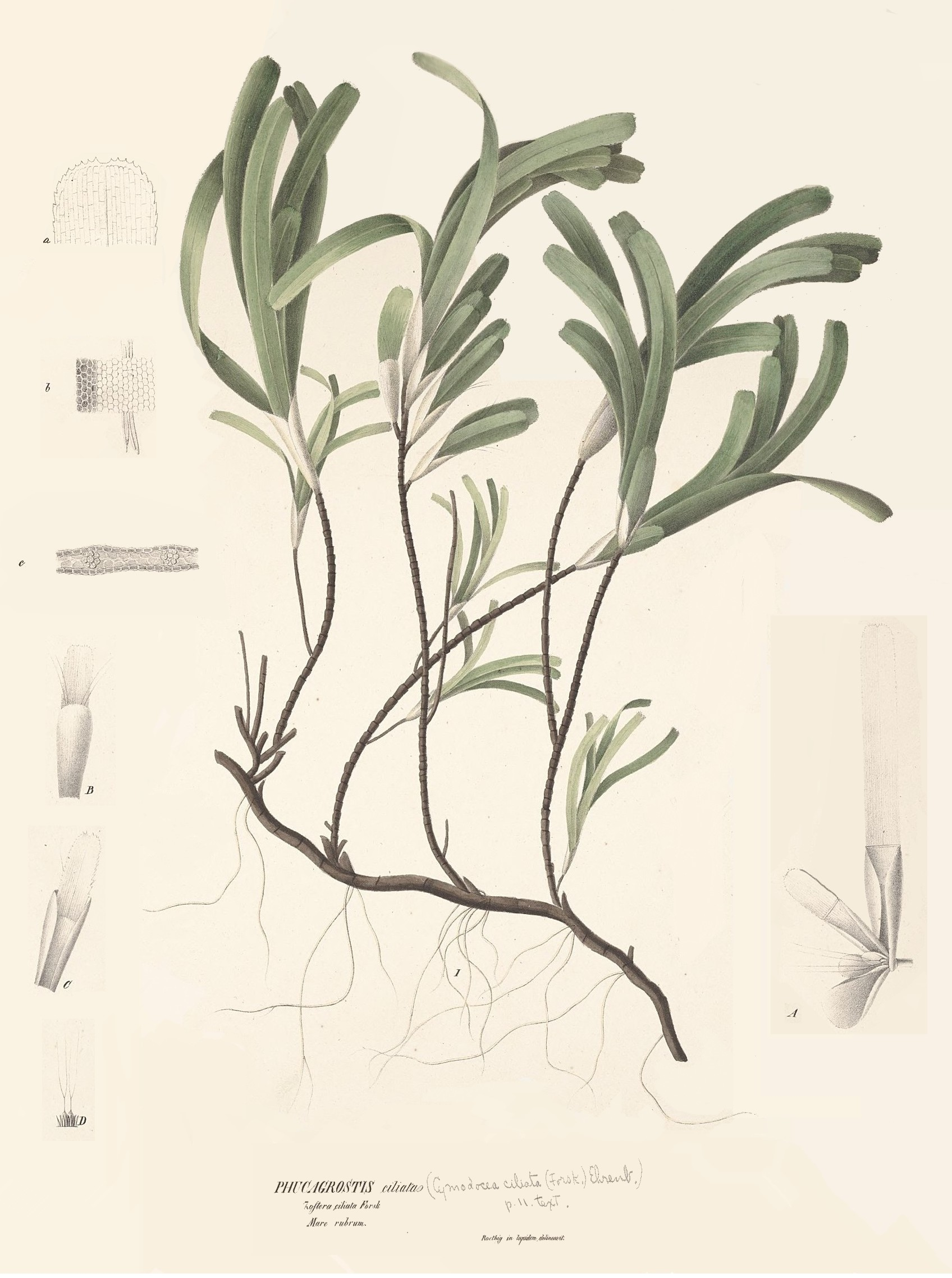
- Illustration of living Thalassodendron sea grass
  Thalassodendron
  - †Thalassodendron auriculaleporis – type locality for species
- Thamnophis
  - †Thamnophis sirtalis
- †Thelecythara
  - †Thelecythara floridana
- Thericium
  - †Thericium burnsii – type locality for species
  - †Thericium callisoma
  - †Thericium chipolanum
  - †Thericium coccodes
  - †Thericium litharium
  - †Thericium peratratum
  - †Thericium peregrinum
  - †Thericium trilicum
  - †Thericium triticum
  - †Thericium vokesorum – type locality for species
  - †Thericium willcoxi
- †Theriodictis
  - †Theriodictis floridanus – tentative report
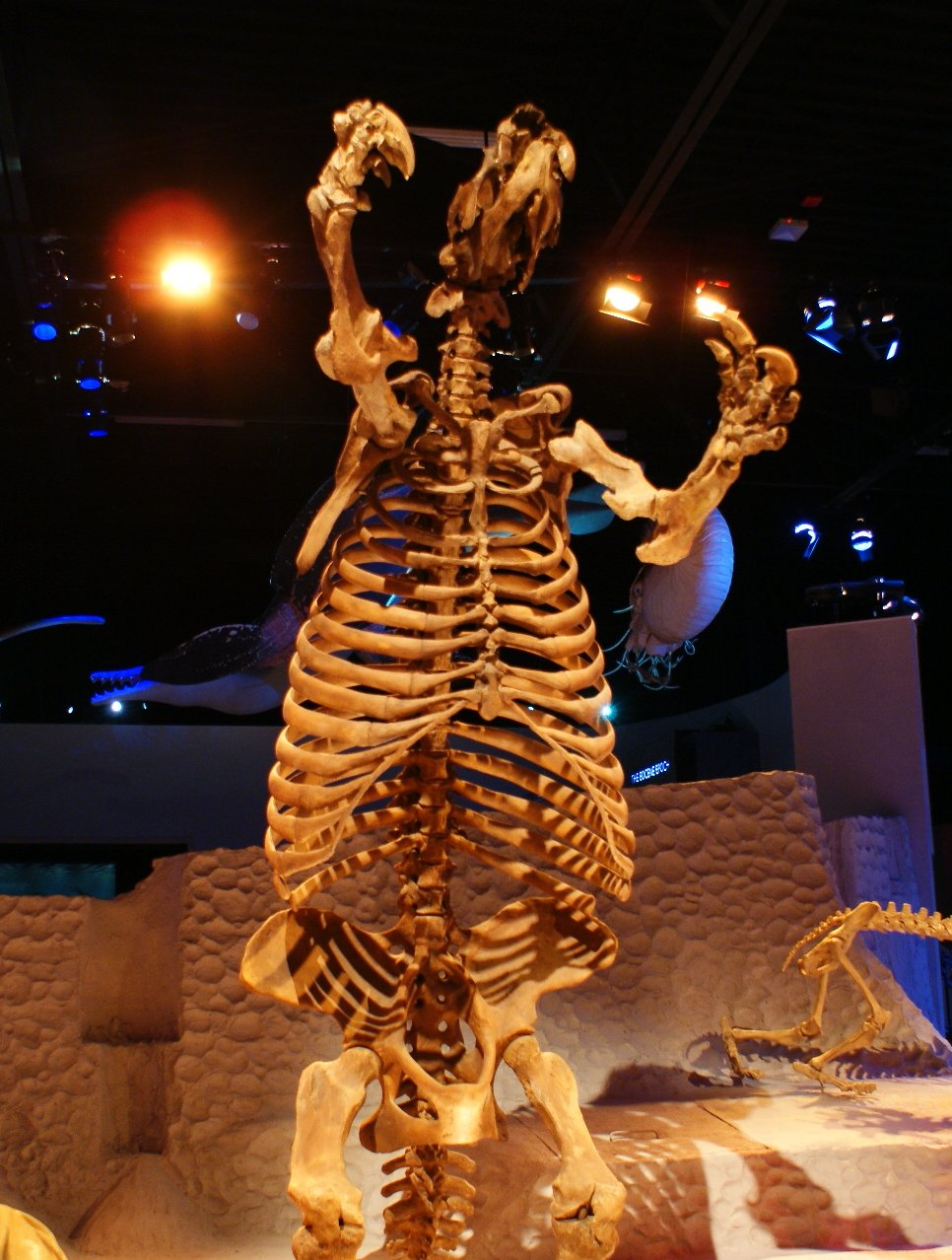
- Mounted fossilized skeleton of the Miocene-Pliocene ground sloth Thinobadistes
  †Thinobadistes
  - †Thinobadistes segnis – type locality for species
  - †Thinobadistes wetzeli – type locality for species
- †Thomasococcyx – type locality for genus
  - †Thomasococcyx philohippus – type locality for species
- Thomomys
  - †Thomomys orientalis
- Thracia
  - †Thracia semirugosa
  - †Thracia tristana – tentative report
  - †Thracia vicksburgiana
- Thyasira
  - †Thyasira trisinuata
- †Thysanus
  - †Thysanus corbicula – type locality for species
  - †Thysanus excentricus
- †Ticholeptus
  - †Ticholeptus zygomaticus – or unidentified comparable form
- Timoclea
  - †Timoclea grus
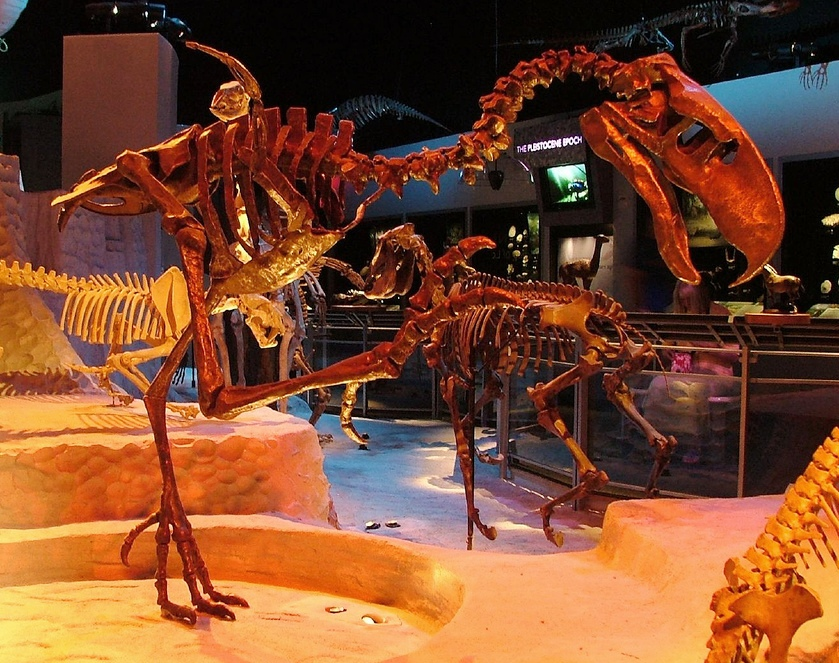
- Mounted fossilized skeleton of the Pliocene-Pleistocene terror bird Titanis
  †Titanis – type locality for genus
  - †Titanis walleri – type locality for species
- Tocobaga
  - †Tocobaga americanus
- Tonna
  - †Tonna galea
- Torcula
  - †Torcula acropora
  - †Torcula alumensis
  - †Torcula apicalis
  - †Torcula apicaulis
  - †Torcula caseyi
  - †Torcula chipolana
  - †Torcula jacula – type locality for species
  - †Torcula jaculus
  - †Torcula martinensis
  - †Torcula mediosulcata
  - †Torcula mississippiensis
  - †Torcula mixta
  - †Torcula subvariabilis
  - †Torcula variabilis
  - †Torcula wagneriana
  - †Torcula waltonensis – type locality for species
- Totanus
  - †Totanus melanoleucas
- †Totlandophis
  - †Totlandophis americanus – type locality for species
- Toxostoma
  - †Toxostoma rufum
- Trachemys
  - †Trachemys inflata
  - †Trachemys nuchocarinata
  - †Trachemys platymarginata
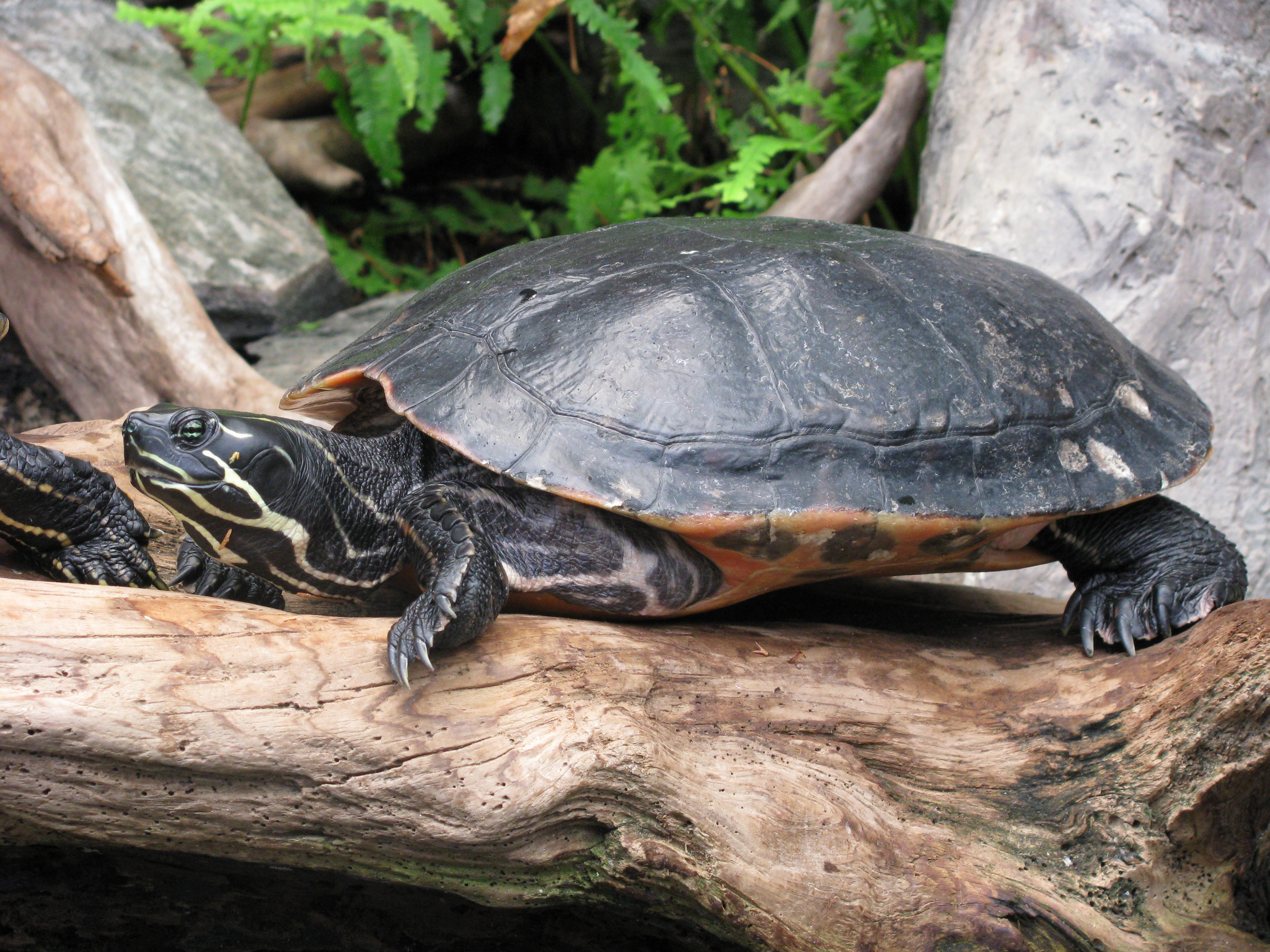
  - A living Trachemys scripta, or pond slider
    †Trachemys scripta
- Trachycardium
  - †Trachycardium anclotense
  - †Trachycardium brooksvillense
  - †Trachycardium cestum
  - †Trachycardium declive
  - †Trachycardium delphicum
  - †Trachycardium egmontianum
  - †Trachycardium emmonsi
  - †Trachycardium evergladensis
  - †Trachycardium floridanum
  - †Trachycardium hernandoense – tentative report
  - †Trachycardium inconspicuum
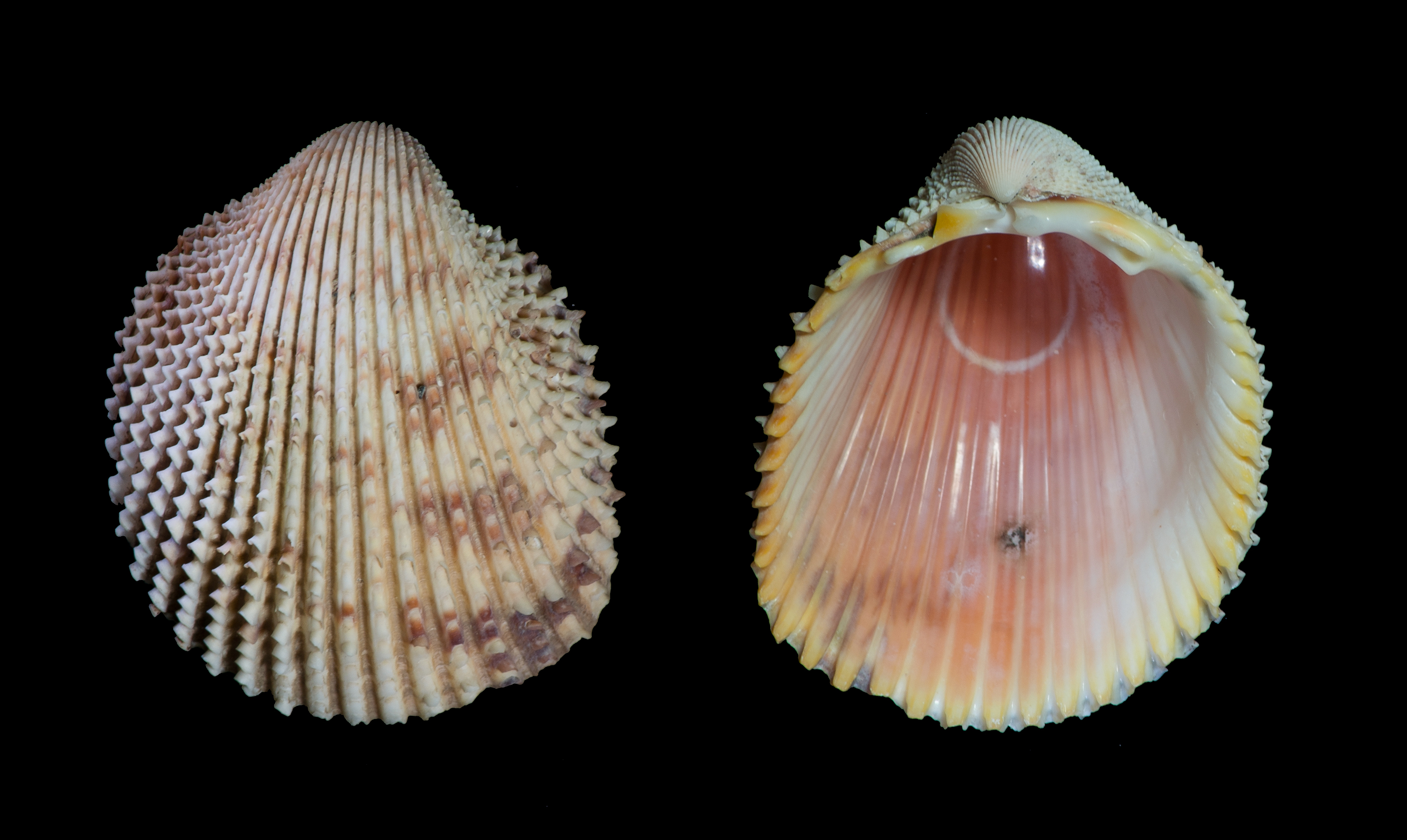
  - Exterior and interior of the shell of a Trachycardium isocardia, or West Indian prickly cockle
    †Trachycardium isocardia
  - †Trachycardium leonense
  - †Trachycardium malacum
  - †Trachycardium mollyni – type locality for species
  - †Trachycardium muricatum
  - †Trachycardium oedalium
  - †Trachycardium plectopleura – type locality for species
  - †Trachycardium silicatum
  - †Trachycardium striatum
  - †Trachycardium ustri
  - †Trachycardium ustrix – type locality for species
  - †Trachycardium virile
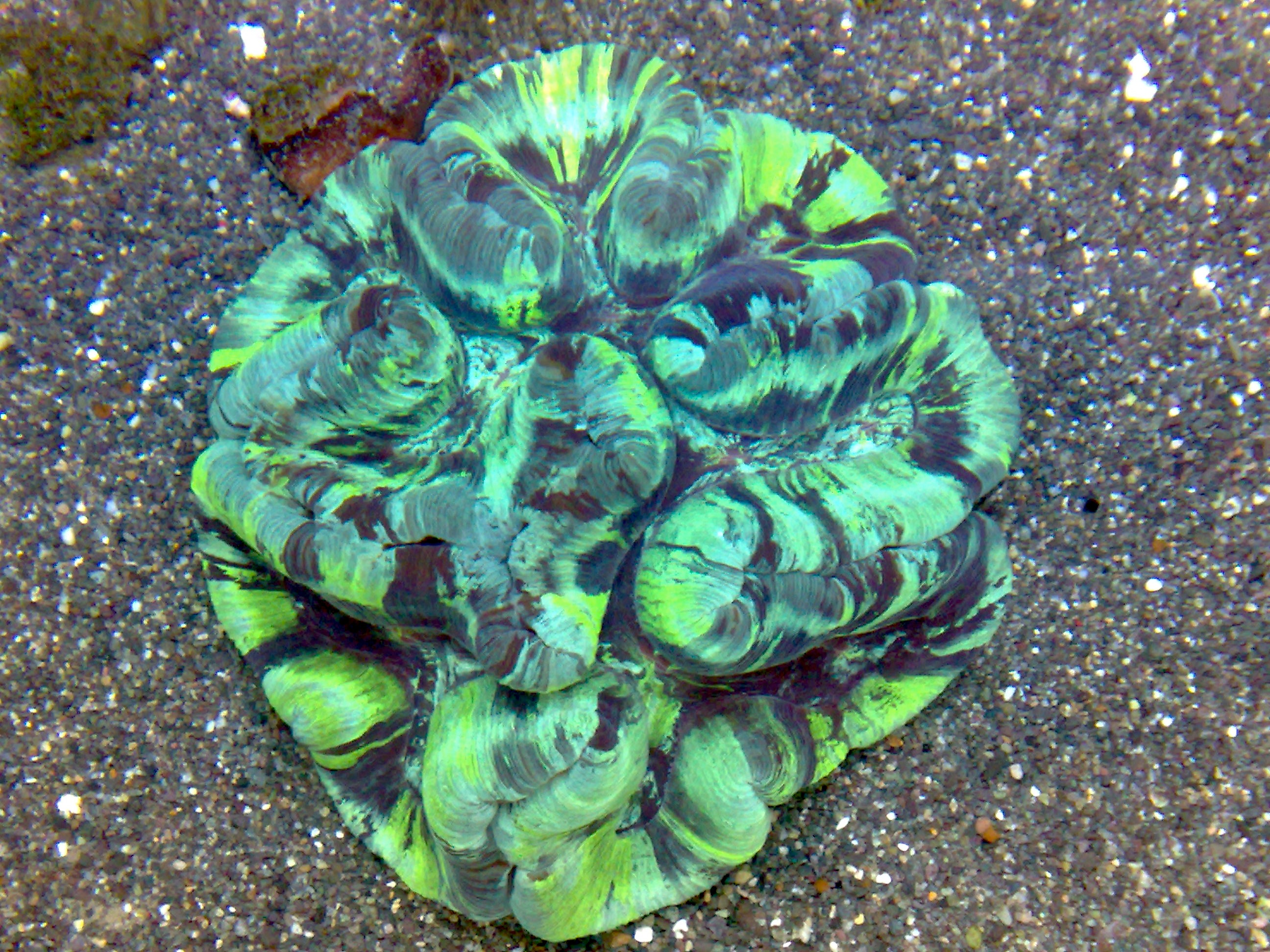
- Living Trachyphyllia geoffroyi, or open brain coral
  Trachyphyllia
  - †Trachyphyllia bilobata
  - †Trachyphyllia dubia
  - †Trachyphyllia walli
- Trachypollia
  - †Trachypollia trachea
- Trajana
  - †Trajana pyta
  - †Trajana veracruzana
- Transennella
  - †Transennella caloosana
  - †Transennella carolinae
  - †Transennella carolinensis
  - †Transennella caryera
  - †Transennella chipolana
  - †Transennella conradiana
  - †Transennella conradina
  - †Transennella cubaniana
  - †Transennella dasa – type locality for species
  - †Transennella santarosana
  - †Transennella stimpsoni
  - †Transennella utica
- Tremarctos
  - †Tremarctos floridanus
- †Trichechodon
  - †Trichechodon huxleyi
- Trichechus
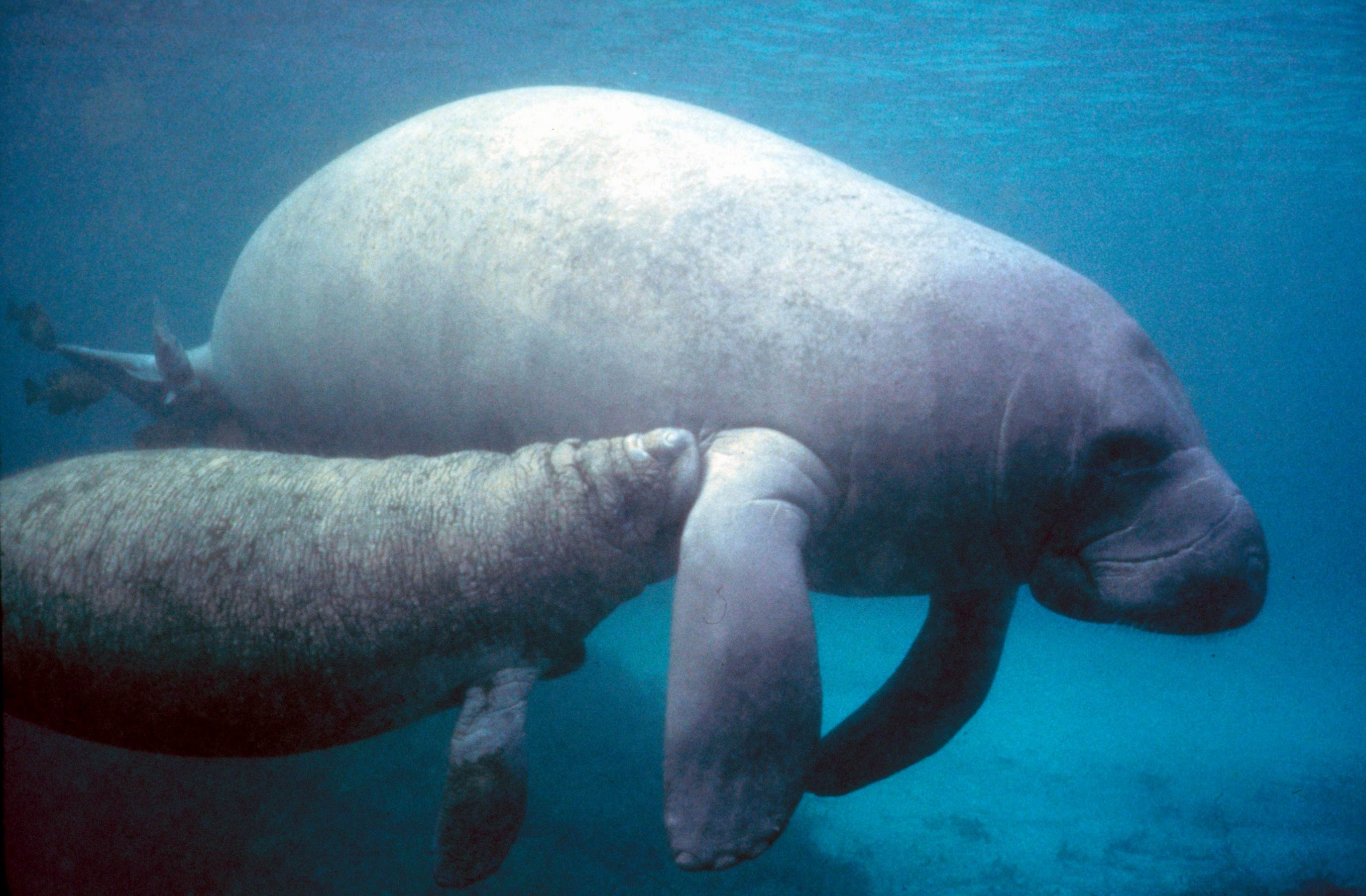
  - A living Trichechus manatus, or West Indian manatee
    †Trichechus manatus
- Tricolia
  - †Tricolia affinis
  - †Tricolia precursor
  - †Tricolia probrevis – type locality for species
  - †Tricolia umbilicata
- †Trigonictis
  - †Trigonictis cookii
  - †Trigonictis macrodon
- Trigoniocardia
  - †Trigoniocardia aliculum
  - †Trigoniocardia berberum
  - †Trigoniocardia columba
  - †Trigoniocardia deadenense
  - †Trigoniocardia gadsdenense
  - †Trigoniocardia protoalicum
  - †Trigoniocardia simrothi
  - †Trigoniocardia willcoxi
- †Trigoniostoma
  - †Trigoniostoma sericea
- Trigonopora
  - †Trigonopora vicksburgica
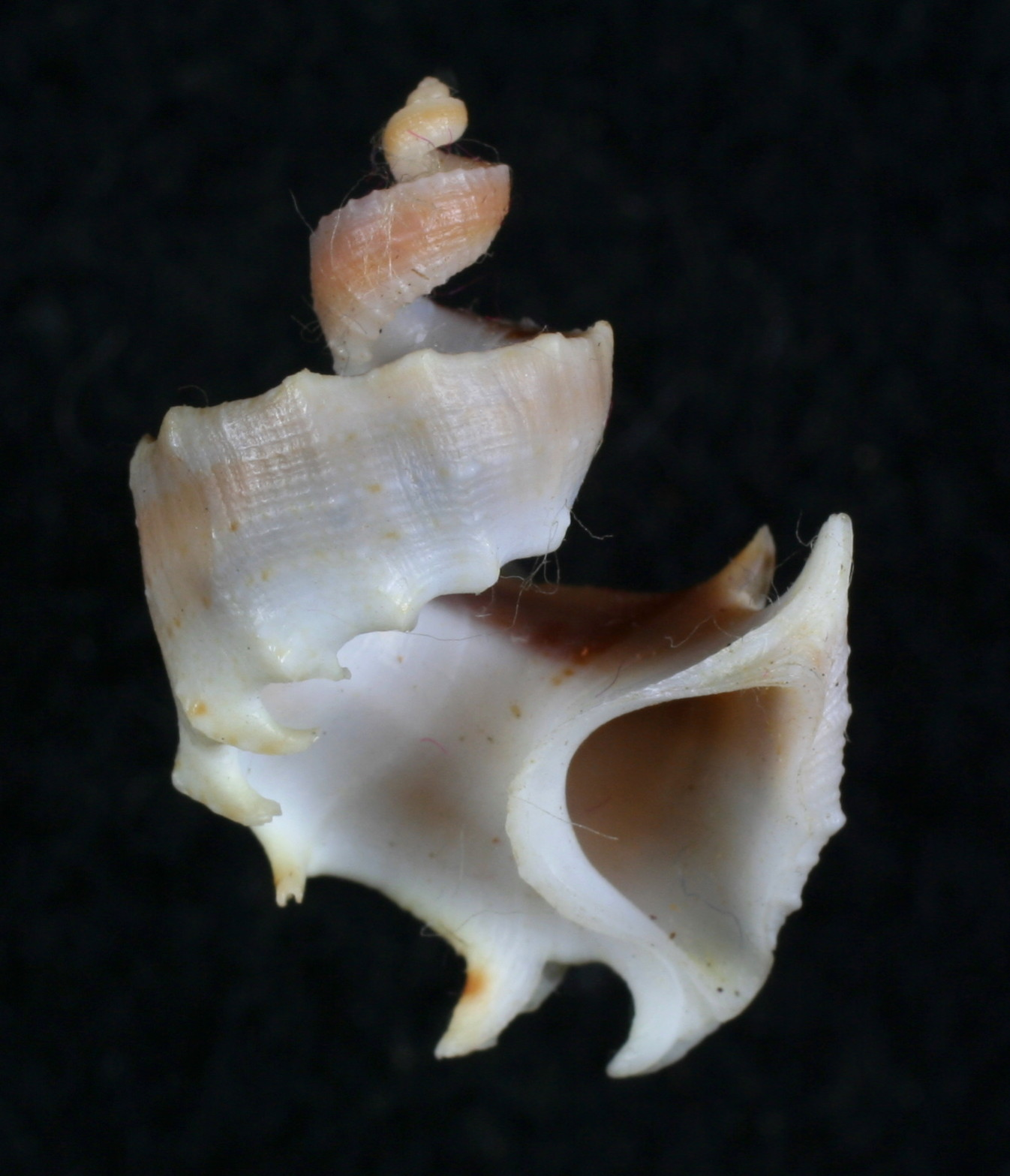
- Shell of a Trigonostoma nutmeg sea snail
  Trigonostoma
  - †Trigonostoma carolinense
  - †Trigonostoma drudi
  - †Trigonostoma druidi
  - †Trigonostoma hoelei
  - †Trigonostoma hoerlei
  - †Trigonostoma marthae
  - †Trigonostoma perspectiva
  - †Trigonostoma sericea
  - †Trigonostoma smithfieldensis
  - †Trigonostoma sphenoidostoma – type locality for species
  - †Trigonostoma subthomasiae
  - †Trigonostoma tampaensis
  - †Trigonostoma tenerum
  - †Trigonostoma teriera
- Trigonulina
  - †Trigonulina dalli – type locality for species
  - †Trigonulina emmonsii
  - †Trigonulina ornata
- Triloculina
  - †Triloculina linneiana
- †Trinacria
  - †Trinacria meekii
- Tringa
  - †Tringa flaviceps
  - †Tringa melanoleuca
  - †Tringa solitaria
- Triphora
  - †Triphora bartschi
  - †Triphora hemphilli
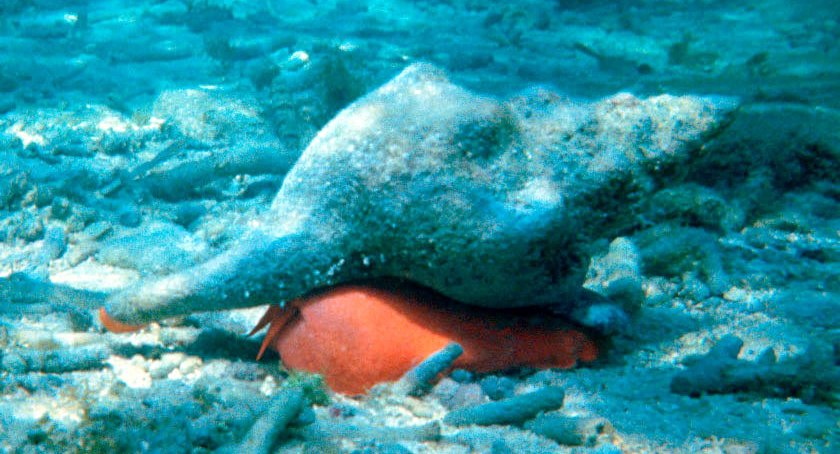
- A living Triplofusus papillosus, or Florida horse conch
  Triplofusus
  - †Triplofusus acmaensis
  - †Triplofusus duplinensis
  - †Triplofusus giganteus
  - †Triplofusus kindlei
- Tritonoharpa
  - †Tritonoharpa lanceolata
- Trivia
  - †Trivia capillata – type locality for species
  - †Trivia chipolana – type locality for species
  - †Trivia clypeus
  - †Trivia islahispaniolae
  - †Trivia juliae – type locality for species
  - †Trivia vaughani – type locality for species
- Trochita
  - †Trochita aperta
  - †Trochita costaria
  - †Trochita crenata – type locality for species
  - †Trochita floridana
  - †Trochita ornata
- Troglodytes
  - †Troglodytes aedon
- Trona
  - †Trona leporina
- Trophon
  - †Trophon lepidota
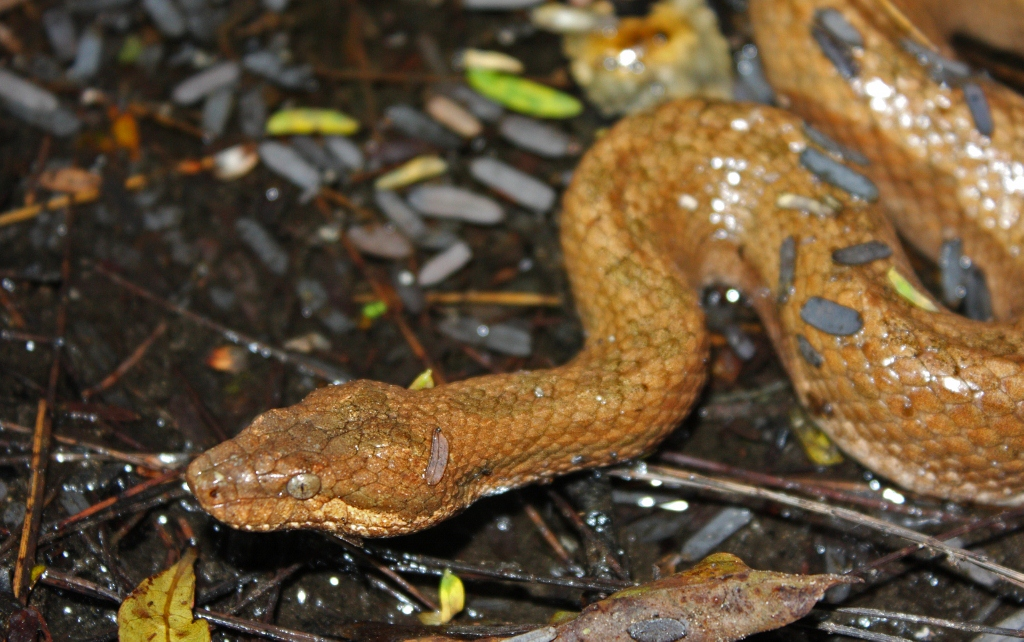
- Close-up portrait of a living Tropidophis, or West Indian wood snake
  †Tropidophis – or unidentified comparable form
- †Tropochasca
  - †Tropochasca lindae
  - †Tropochasca metae
  - †Tropochasca petiti
- †Trossulasalpinx
  - †Trossulasalpinx curtus
  - †Trossulasalpinx kissimmeenesis
  - †Trossulasalpinx lindae
  - †Trossulasalpinx maryae
  - †Trossulasalpinx trossulus
  - †Trossulasalpinx vokesae
- Trypostega
  - †Trypostega inornata
- †Tubucella
  - †Tubucella gibbosa
- Tucetona
  - †Tucetona arata
  - †Tucetona lamyi
  - †Tucetona pectinata
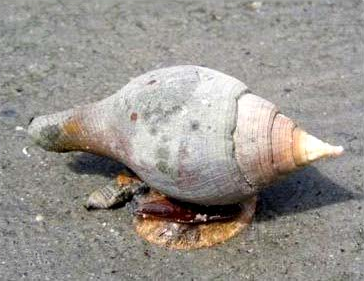
- A living Turbinella, or chank
  Turbinella
  - †Turbinella chipolanus
  - †Turbinella dodonaius – type locality for species
  - †Turbinella hoerlei
  - †Turbinella lindar
  - †Turbinella polygonatus
  - †Turbinella scolymoides
  - †Turbinella streami
  - †Turbinella suwanneensis
  - †Turbinella wendyae
  - †Turbinella wheeleri
- Turbo
  - †Turbo castaenus
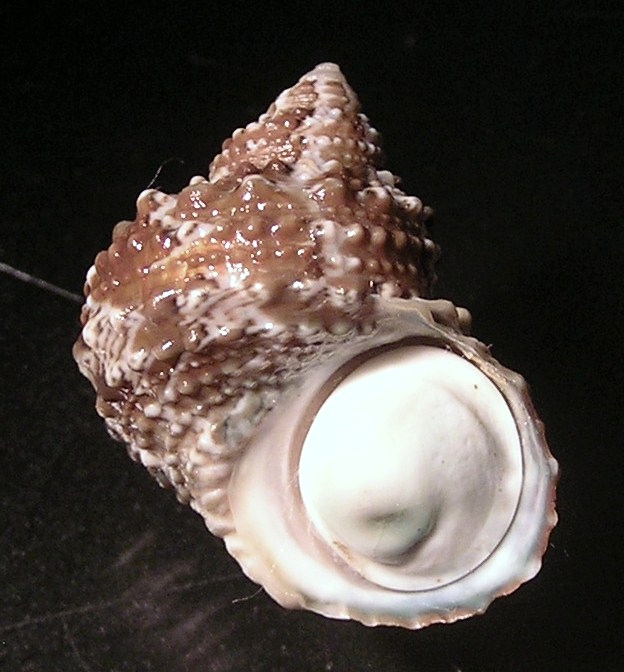
  - Shell of a Turbo castanea, or chestnut turban sea snail
    †Turbo castanea
  - †Turbo crenorugatus
  - †Turbo duerri
  - †Turbo floridensis
  - †Turbo lindae
  - †Turbo rhectogrammicus
  - †Turbo wellsi
- Turbonilla
  - †Turbonilla hemphilli
  - †Turbonilla levis – or unidentified comparable form
- Turdus
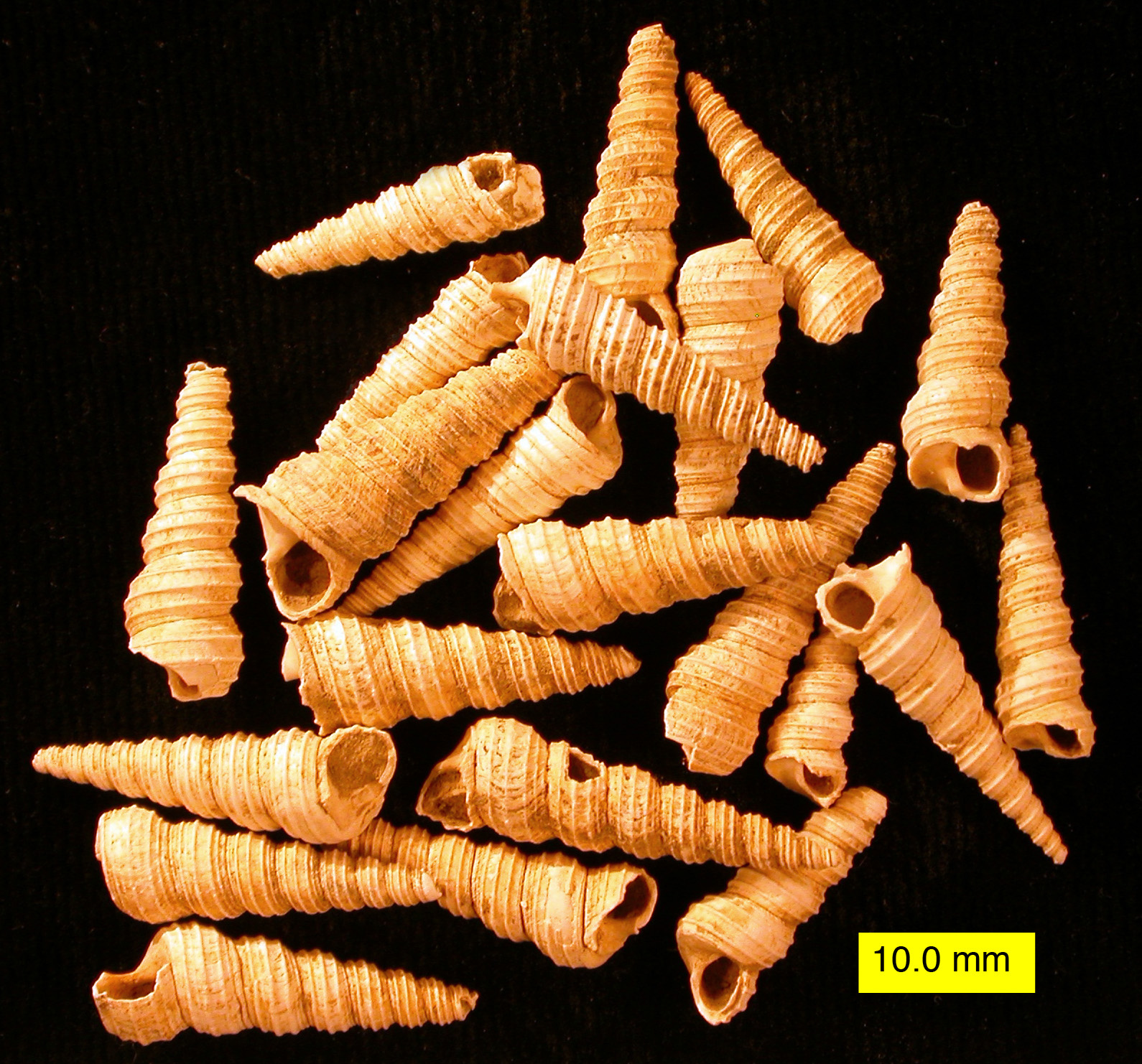
- Fossilized shells of the Late Jurassic-modern tower snail Turritella
  Turritella
  - †Turritella alcida
  - †Turritella alumensis
  - †Turritella apicalis
  - †Turritella atacta
  - †Turritella bifastigata – or unidentified related form
  - †Turritella bowenae
  - †Turritella buckinghamensis
  - †Turritella cookei
  - †Turritella dalli – type locality for species
  - †Turritella etiwanensis
  - †Turritella fischeri – type locality for species
  - †Turritella floridana
  - †Turritella gatunensis
  - †Turritella gladeensis
  - †Turritella halensis – or unidentified comparable form
  - †Turritella holmesi
  - †Turritella litharia
  - †Turritella magnasulcus
  - †Turritella maiquetiana
  - †Turritella mansfieldi
  - †Turritella martinensis
  - †Turritella megalobasis
  - †Turritella pagodaeformis
  - †Turritella perattenuata
  - †Turritella pontoni
  - †Turritella segmenta – type locality for species
  - †Turritella subannulata
  - †Turritella subanulata
  - †Turritella subgrundifera
  - †Turritella tampae
  - †Turritella tarponensis
  - †Turritella vicksburgensis
  - †Turritella wagneriana
  - †Turritella waltonensis
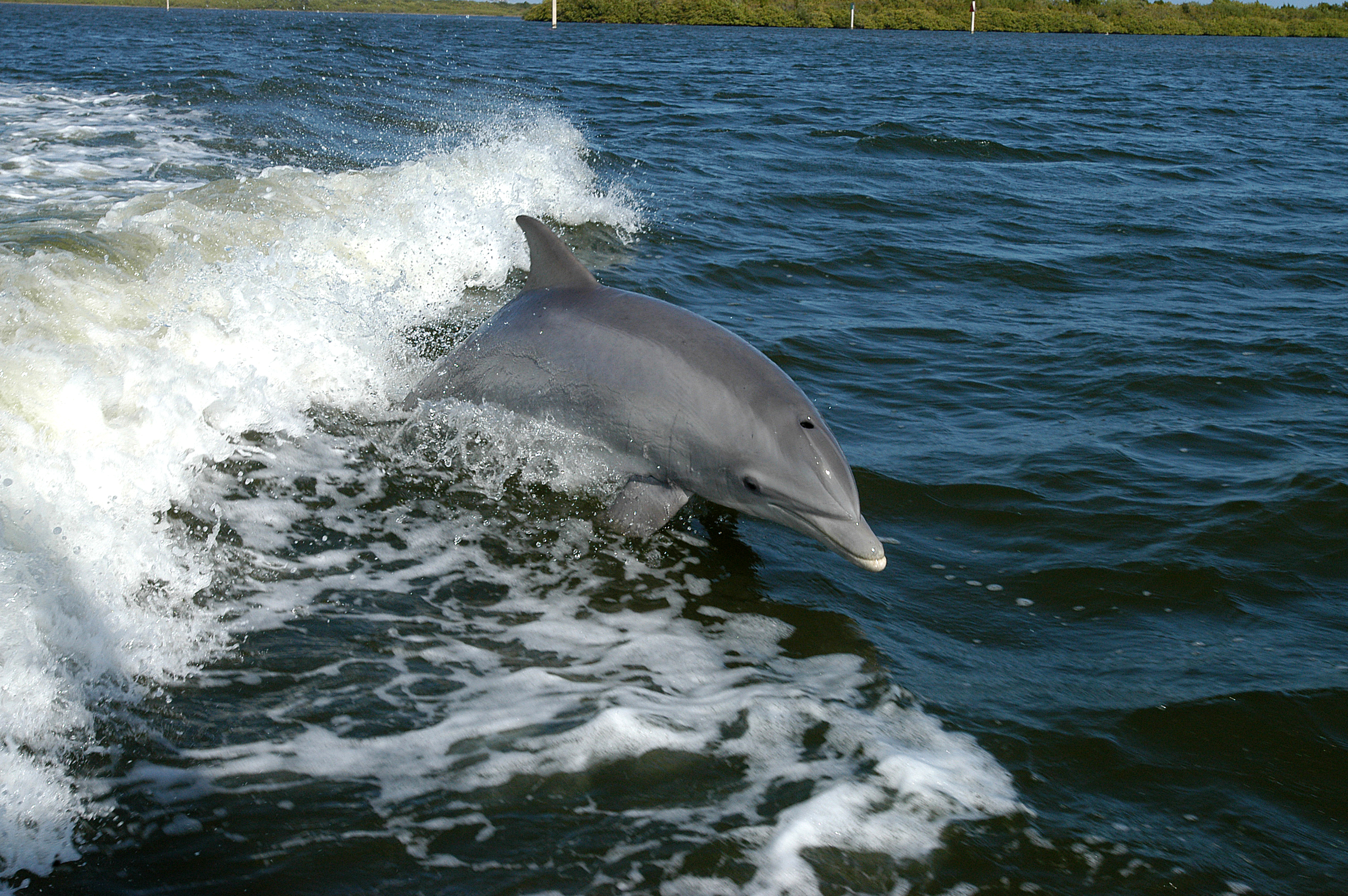
- A living Tursiops, or bottlenose dolphin
  Tursiops – or unidentified comparable form
- Tutufa
  - †Tutufa pelouatensis
- Tympanuchus
  - †Tympanuchus cupido
- Typhina
  - †Typhina alata
  - †Typhina mississippiensis
  - †Typhina obesa
- Typhinellus
  - †Typhinellus chipolanus – type locality for species
  - †Typhinellus floridonus
- Typhis
  - †Typhis floridanus – type locality for species
  - †Typhis harrisi – type locality for species
  - †Typhis keenae – type locality for species
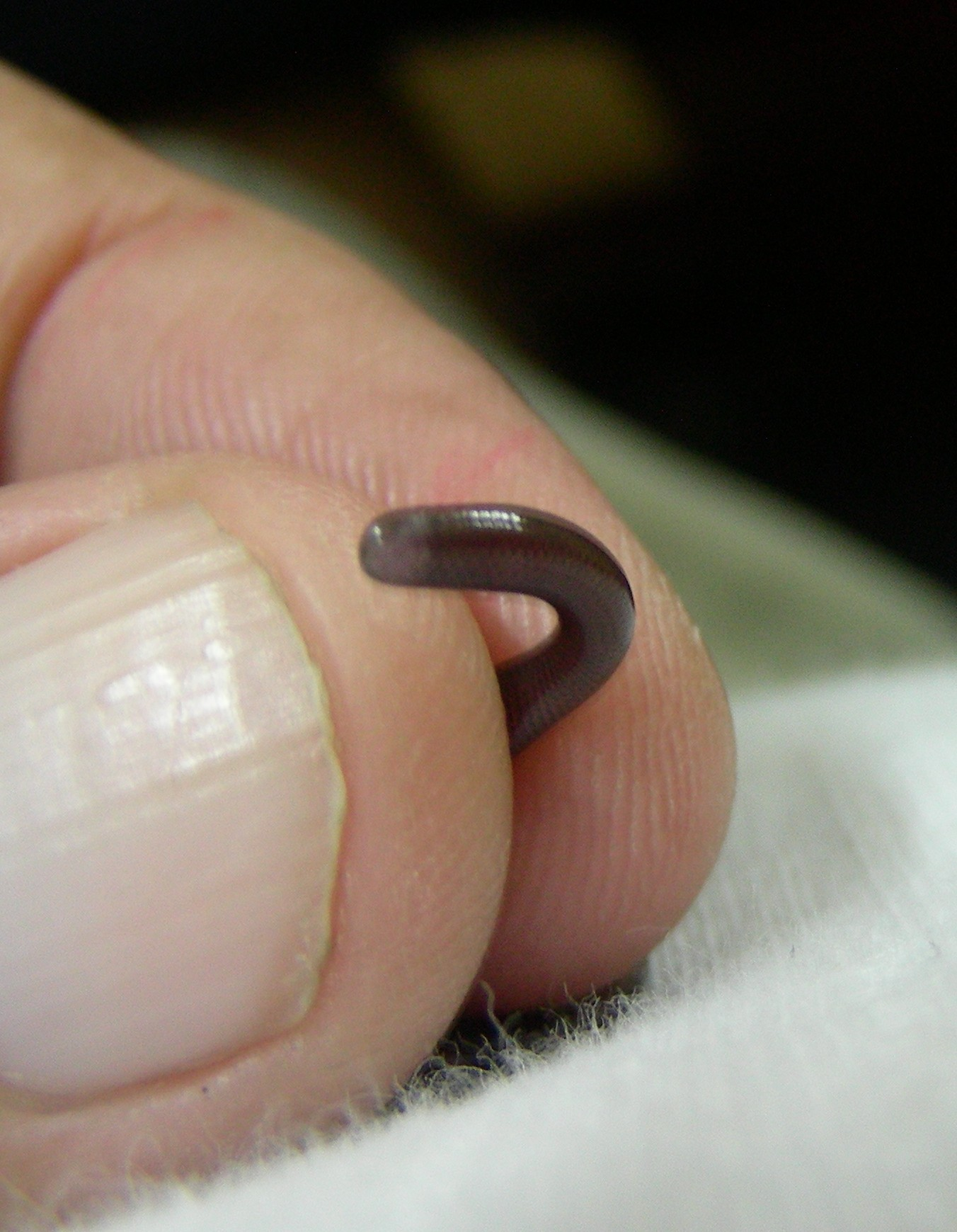
- Close-up portrait of a living Typhlops blind snake
  Typhlops – tentative report
- Tyrannus
  - †Tyrannus tyrannus
- Tyronia
  - †Tyronia aequiscostata
- †Tyrpostega
  - †Tyrpostega inornata
- Tyto
  - †Tyto furcata pratincola

== U ==
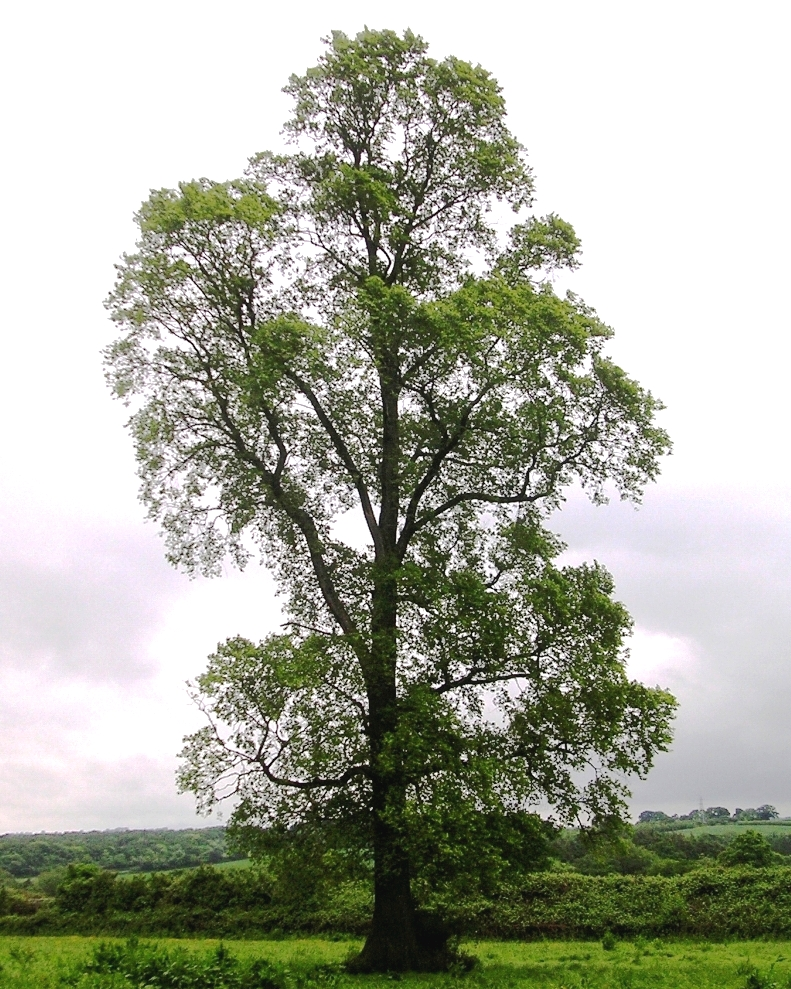
- A living Ulmus, or elm
  Ulmus
  - †Ulmus prestonia – type locality for species
- Umbonula
  - †Umbonula radiata
- †Urocoptis
  - †Urocoptis floridana
- Urocyon
  - †Urocyon cinereoargenteus
  - †Urocyon citrinus – type locality for species
  - †Urocyon minicephalus – type locality for species
  - †Urocyon webbi – type locality for species
- Uromitra
  - †Uromitra amblipleura – type locality for species
  - †Uromitra barnardense
  - †Uromitra berkeyi
  - †Uromitra climacoton – type locality for species
  - †Uromitra climax – type locality for species
  - †Uromitra cnestum – type locality for species
  - †Uromitra ctenotum – type locality for species
  - †Uromitra gunteri
  - †Uromitra hamadryados
  - †Uromitra hamadryas – type locality for species
  - †Uromitra healeyi
  - †Uromitra holmesii
  - †Uromitra mangilopse – type locality for species
  - †Uromitra mikkulum – type locality for species
  - †Uromitra myrum
  - †Uromitra scopuli
  - †Uromitra syrum
  - †Uromitra triptum – type locality for species
  - †Uromitra willcoxi
- Urosalpinx
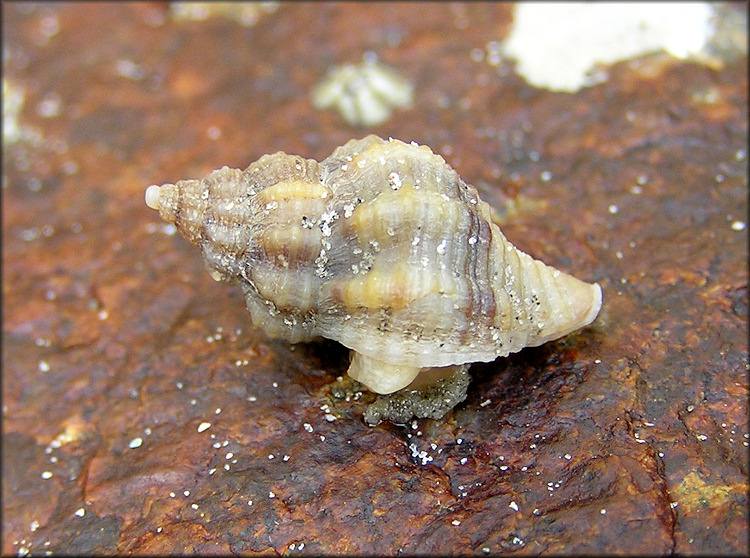
  - A living Urosalpinx sea snail, or oyster drill
    †Urosalpinx cinerea
  - †Urosalpinx hillsboroensis
  - †Urosalpinx inornata
  - †Urosalpinx perrugata
  - †Urosalpinx phrikna
  - †Urosalpinx rucksorum
  - †Urosalpinx subsidus
  - †Urosalpinx suffolkensis
  - †Urosalpinx tribaka – type locality for species
  - †Urosalpinx trossulus
  - †Urosalpinx violetae
  - †Urosalpinx xustris – type locality for species
  - †Urosalpinx zulloi
- Ursus
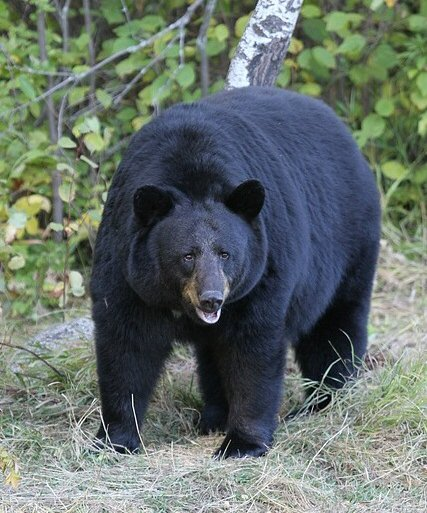
  - A living Ursus americanus, or American black bear
    †Ursus americanus
- Uvigerina
  - †Uvigerina auberiana
  - †Uvigerina perigrina

== V ==
- †Vaginella
  - †Vaginella chipolana
- Valvulineria
  - †Valvulineria floridana
- Vasum
  - †Vasum barkleyae
  - †Vasum chilesi
  - †Vasum elongatum – type locality for species
  - †Vasum floridanum
  - †Vasum griffini
  - †Vasum haitensis
  - †Vasum hertweckorum
  - †Vasum horridum
  - †Vasum hyshugari
  - †Vasum jacksonae
  - †Vasum jacksonense
  - †Vasum kissimmense
  - †Vasum lindae
  - †Vasum locklini
  - †Vasum martinshugari
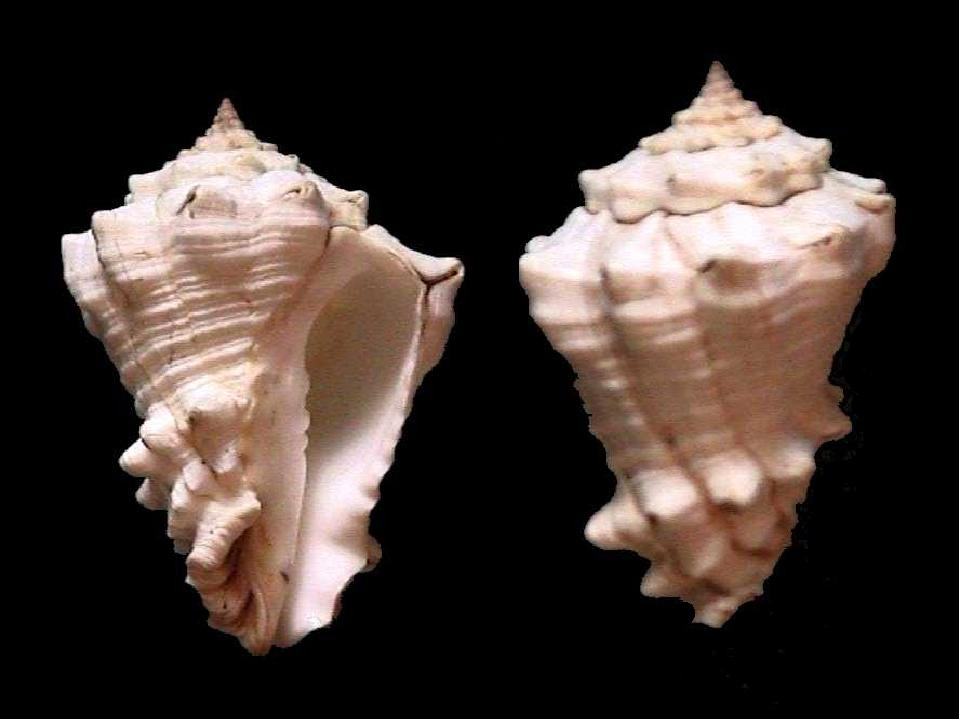
  - Shell in multiple views of a Vasum muricatum, or Caribbean vase sea snail
    †Vasum muricatum
  - †Vasum olssoni
  - †Vasum palmerae
  - †Vasum shinerae
  - †Vasum shrinerae
  - †Vasum squamosum
  - †Vasum subcapitellum
  - †Vasum suwanneensis
  - †Vasum tribulosum – type locality for species
  - †Vasum violetae
  - †Vasum vokesae
  - †Vasum vokesi
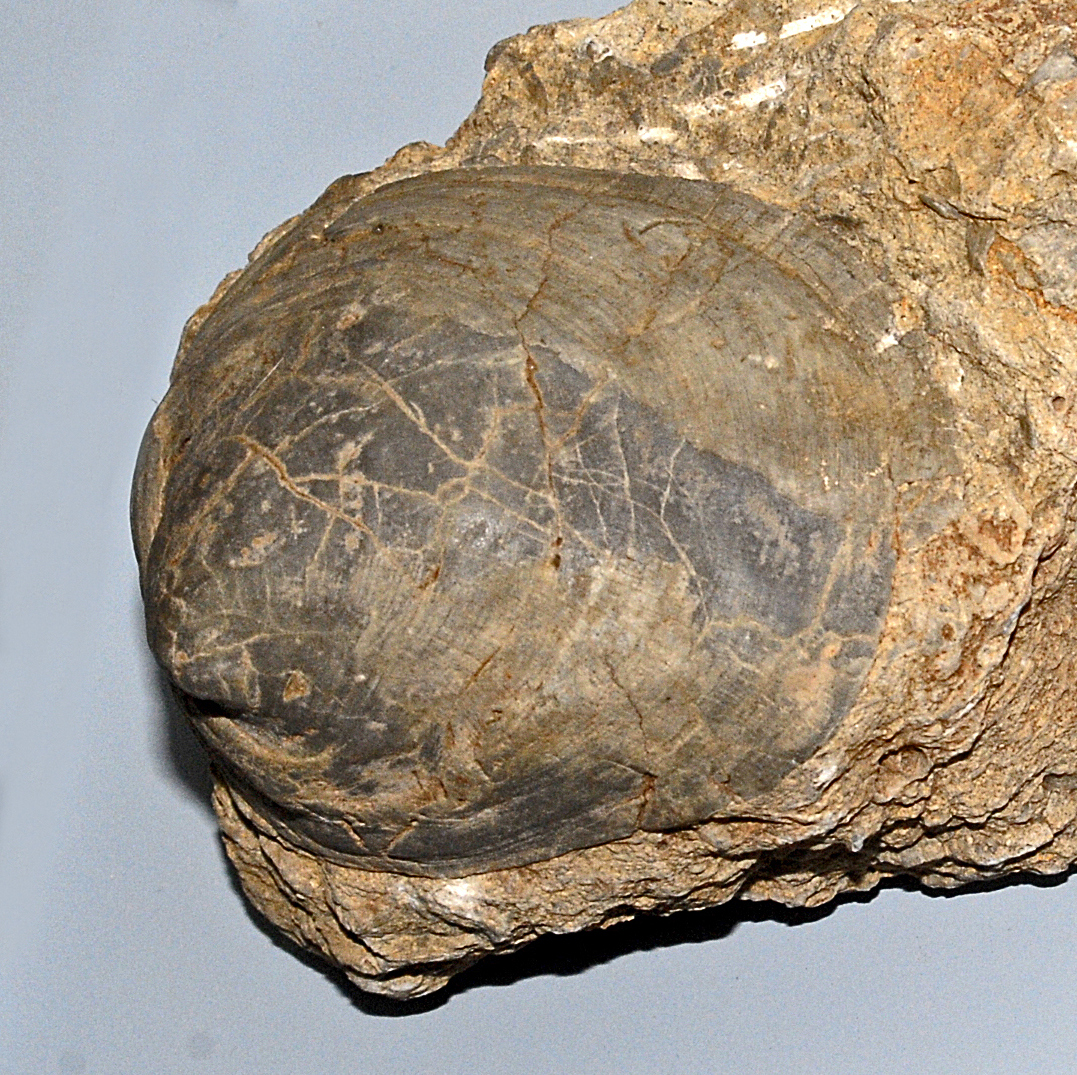
- Fossilized shell of the Paleocene-Miocene nerite sea snail Velates
  †Velates
  - †Velates perversus
- Venericardia
  - †Venericardia hesperide
  - †Venericardia nodifera
  - †Venericardia olga
  - †Venericardia vicksburgiana
  - †Venericardia withlacoochensis – type locality for species
- Ventricolaria
  - †Ventricolaria blandiana – or unidentified comparable form
- Ventrilia
  - †Ventrilia alumensis
  - †Ventrilia carolinensis
  - †Ventrilia rucksorum
  - †Ventrilia senarium
  - †Ventrilia smithfieldensis
  - †Ventrilia tenerum
- Venus
  - †Venus halidona
  - †Venus marionensis
- Vermicularia
  - †Vermicularia fargoi
  - †Vermicularia nigricana
  - †Vermicularia recta
  - †Vermicularia spirata
  - †Vermicularia weberi
  - †Vermicularia woodringi
- Vermivora
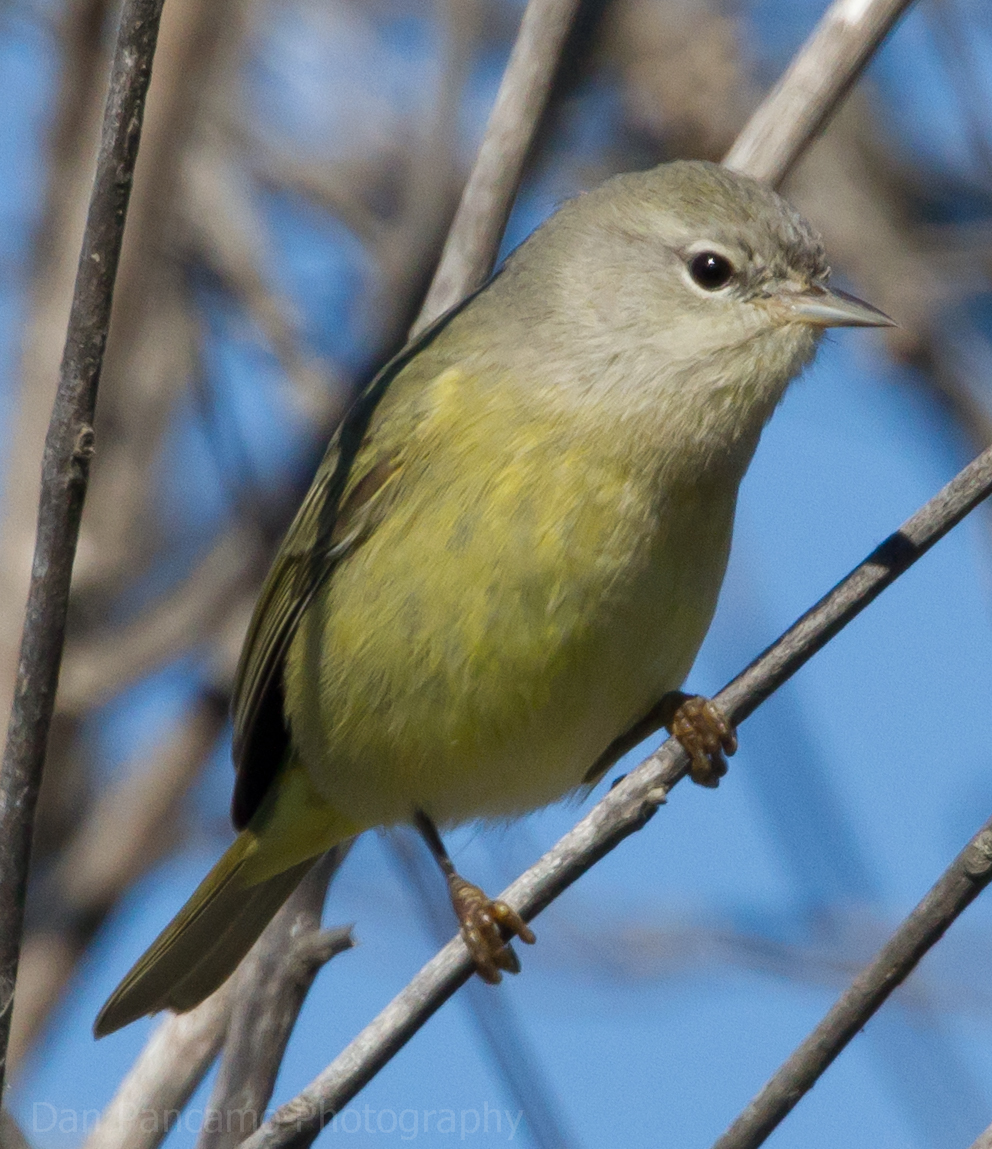
  - A living Oreothlypis celata (formerly Vermivora celata), or orange-crowned warbler
    †Vermivora celata – or unidentified comparable form
- Vertebralina
  - †Vertebralina cassis
- Verticordia
  - †Verticordia dalli
- Vertigo
  - †Vertigo milium
  - †Vertigo ovata
- Vexillum
  - †Vexillum ctenotum
  - †Vexillum triptum
  - †Vexillum wandoense
- †Viburnum
  - †Viburnum dentatum – or unidentified comparable form
  - †Viburnum nudum
- †Vireo
  - †Vireo griseus
- †Virgulina
  - †Virgulina fusiformis – or unidentified comparable form
  - †Virgulina miocenica
  - †Virgulina pontoni
- Vitis
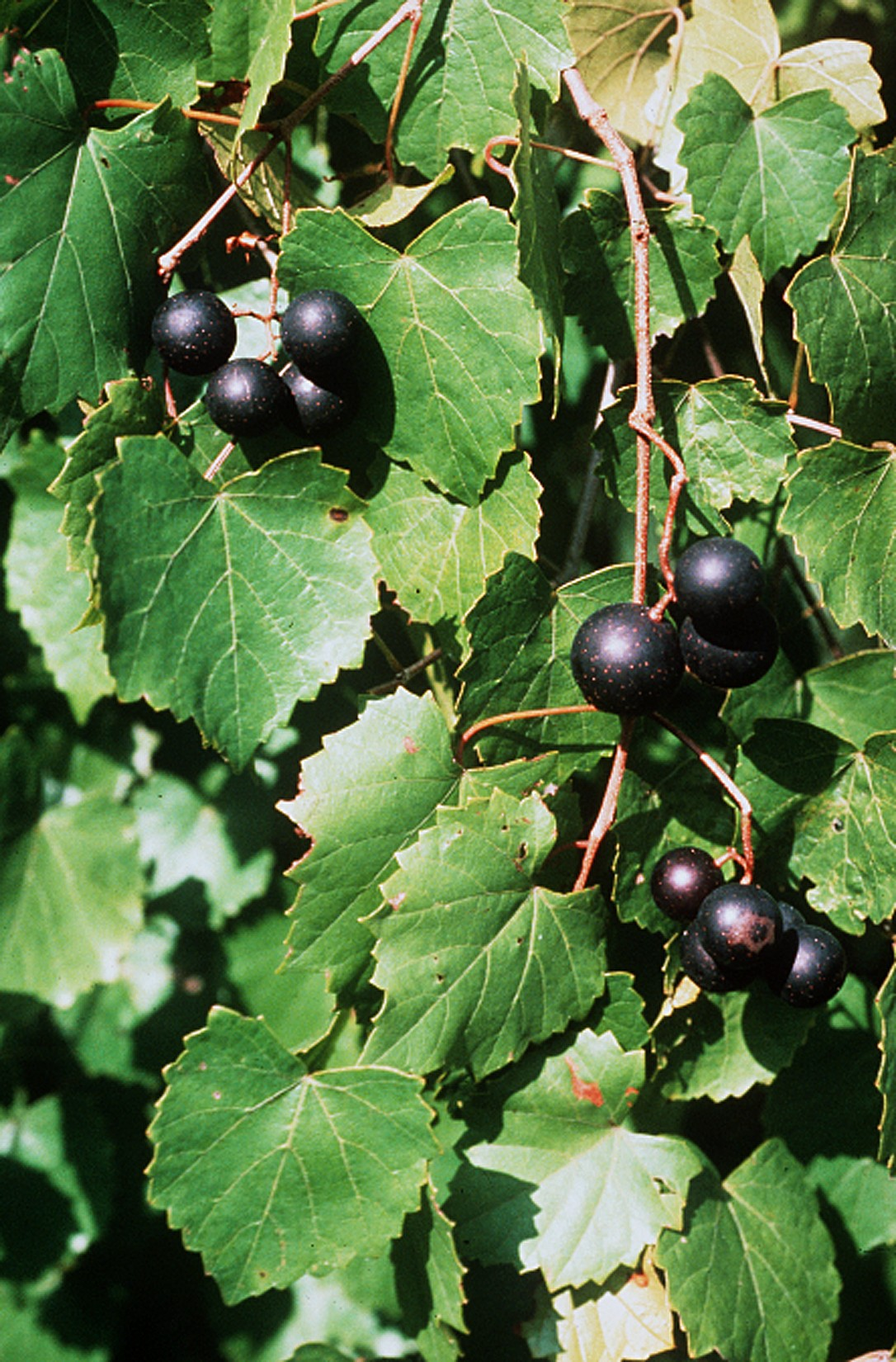
  - Fruit and foliage of living Vitis rotundifolia, or muscadine grape vines
    †Vitis rotundifolia – or unidentified comparable form
- †Vitricythara
  - †Vitricythara metrica
  - †Vitricythara micromeris
- Vitrinella
  - †Vitrinella excavata – type locality for species
  - †Vitrinella floridana
  - †Vitrinella seminola – type locality for species
  - †Vitrinella waltonia – type locality for species
- Vitularia
  - †Vitularia liguabson
- Viviparus
  - †Viviparus georgianus
- Vokesimurex
  - †Vokesimurex anniae
  - †Vokesimurex bellegladeensis
  - †Vokesimurex bermontianus
  - †Vokesimurex diegelae
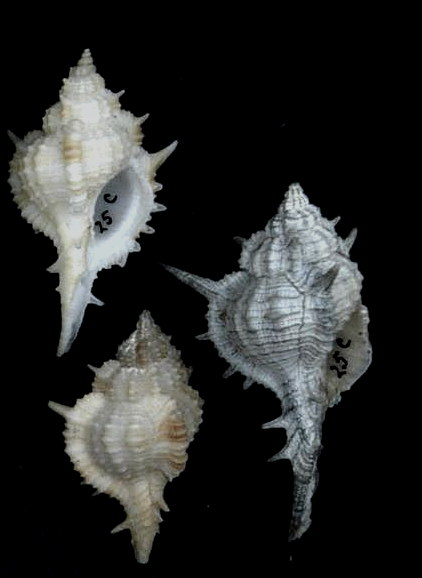
  - Shell in multiple views of a Vokesimurex rubidus, or rose murex sea snail
    †Vokesimurex rubidus
- †Vokesinotus
  - †Vokesinotus lepidotus
  - †Vokesinotus perrugatus
- Volsella
- †Voluticella – type locality for genus
  - †Voluticella levensis – type locality for species
- Volutifusus
  - †Volutifusus emmonsi
  - †Volutifusus halscotti
  - †Volutifusus mutabilis
  - †Volutifusus obtusa
  - †Volutifusus obtusus
  - †Volutifusus spengleri
- Volvarina
  - †Volvarina acusvesta
  - †Volvarina albolineata
  - †Volvarina avena
  - †Volvarina belloides
  - †Volvarina eobella – type locality for species
  - †Volvarina oryzoides – type locality for species
- Volvula
  - †Volvula phoinicoides – type locality for species
- Volvulella
  - †Volvulella oxytata
  - †Volvulella persimilis
  - †Volvulella phoinicoides
  - †Volvulella tritica
- Vulpes
  - †Vulpes stenognathus
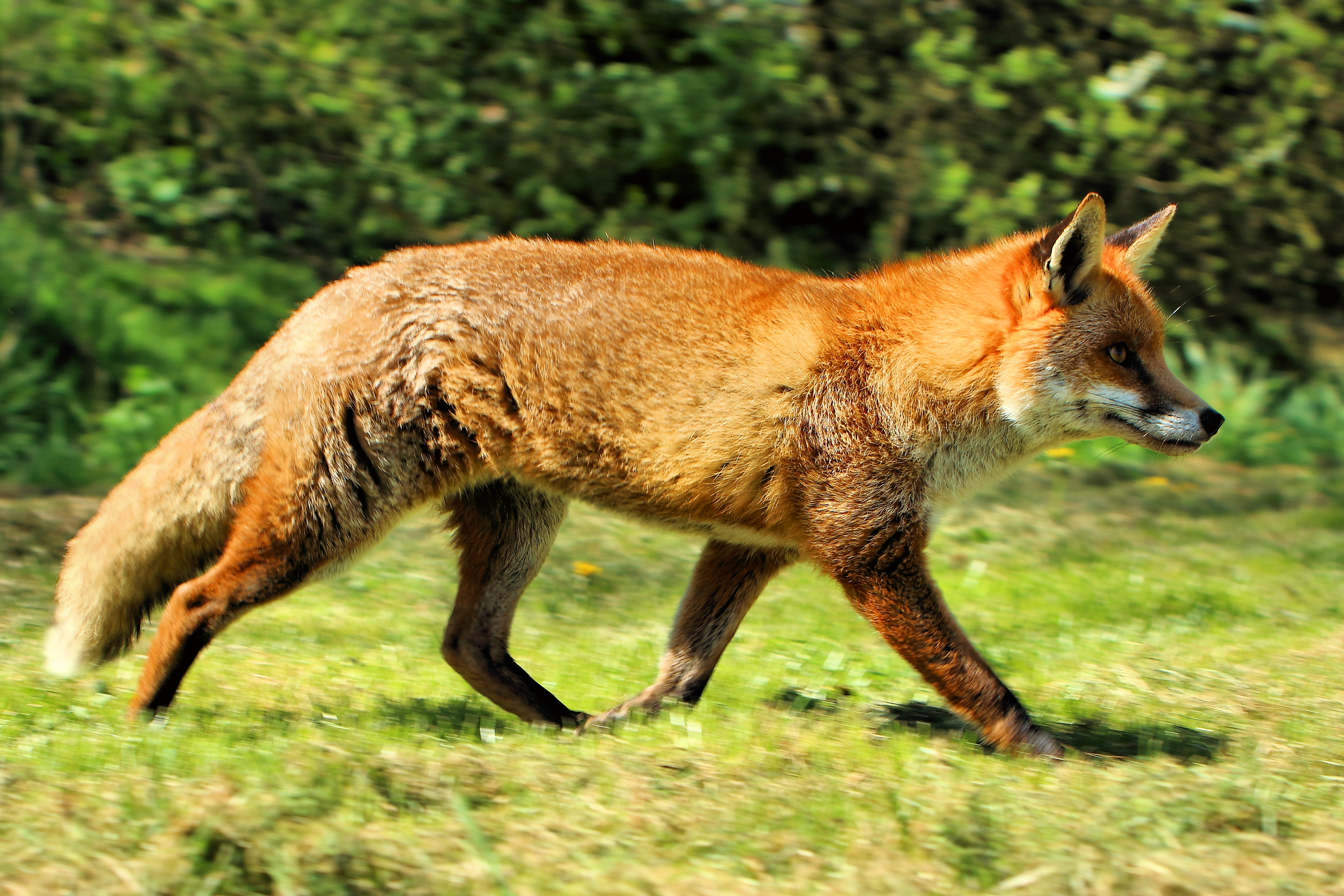
  - A living Vulpes vulpes, or red fox
    Vulpes vulpes – type locality for species

== W ==
- †Weisbordella
  - †Weisbordella cubae
  - †Weisbordella johnsoni
- †Wythella
  - †Wythella eldridgei

== X ==
- Xancus
  - †Xancus regina
- †Xanthium
- †Xenochelys
  - †Xenochelys floridensis – type locality for species
- Xenophora
  - †Xenophora conchyliophora
  - †Xenophora conchyliphora
  - †Xenophora delecta
  - †Xenophora textilina
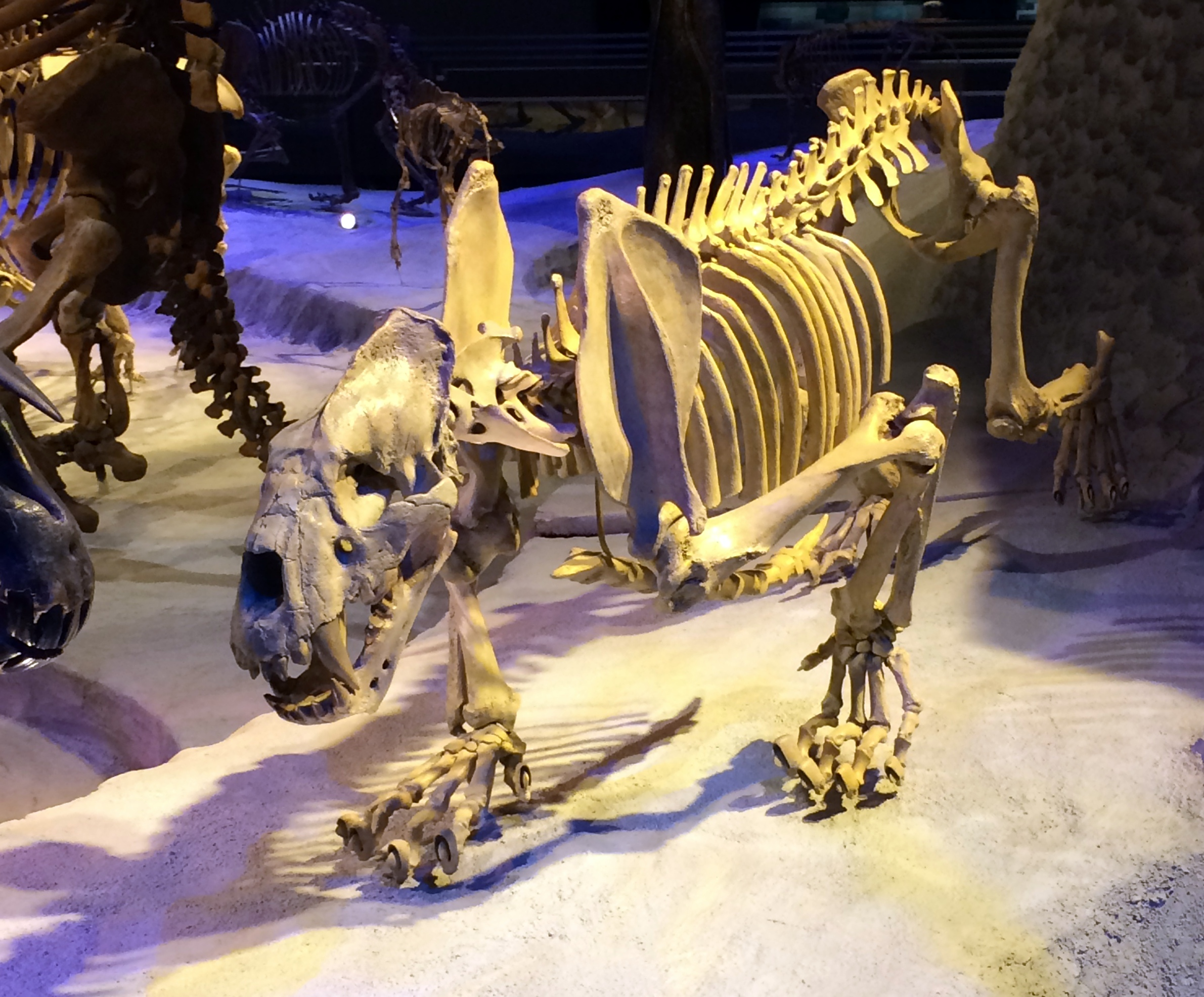
- Mounted fossilized skeleton of the Pleistocene saber-toothed cat Xenosmilus
  †Xenosmilus – type locality for genus
  - †Xenosmilus hodsonae – type locality for species

== Y ==
- Yoldia
  - †Yoldia frater
  - †Yoldia kurzi
  - †Yoldia soror – type locality for species
  - †Yoldia waltonensis
- †Yumaceras
  - †Yumaceras hamiltoni

== Z ==
- Zapus
- Zebina
  - †Zebina browniana
  - †Zebina johnsoni
  - †Zebina laevigata
  - †Zebina tersa
  - †Zebina vittata – type locality for species
- Zenaida
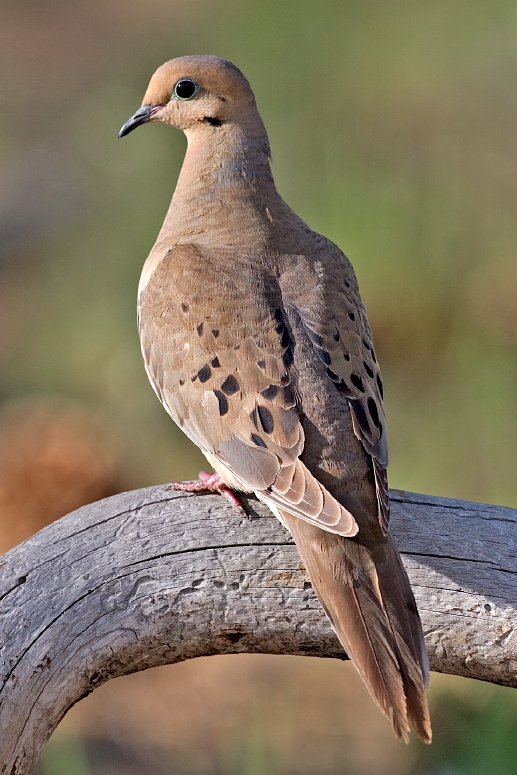
  - Mourning dove
    †Zenaida macroura
  - †Zenaida macroura
- †Zenaidura
  - †Zenaidura macroura
- Zizyphus
- †Zodiolestes
  - †Zodiolestes freundi – type locality for species
- Zonaria
  - †Zonaria heilprinii – type locality for species
  - †Zonaria praelatior – type locality for species
  - †Zonaria shirleyae – type locality for species
  - †Zonaria spurcoides
  - †Zonaria theresae – type locality for species
  - †Zonaria tumulus
- Zonitoides
  - †Zonitoides arboreus
- Zonotrichia
  - †Zonotrichia albicollis – or unidentified comparable form
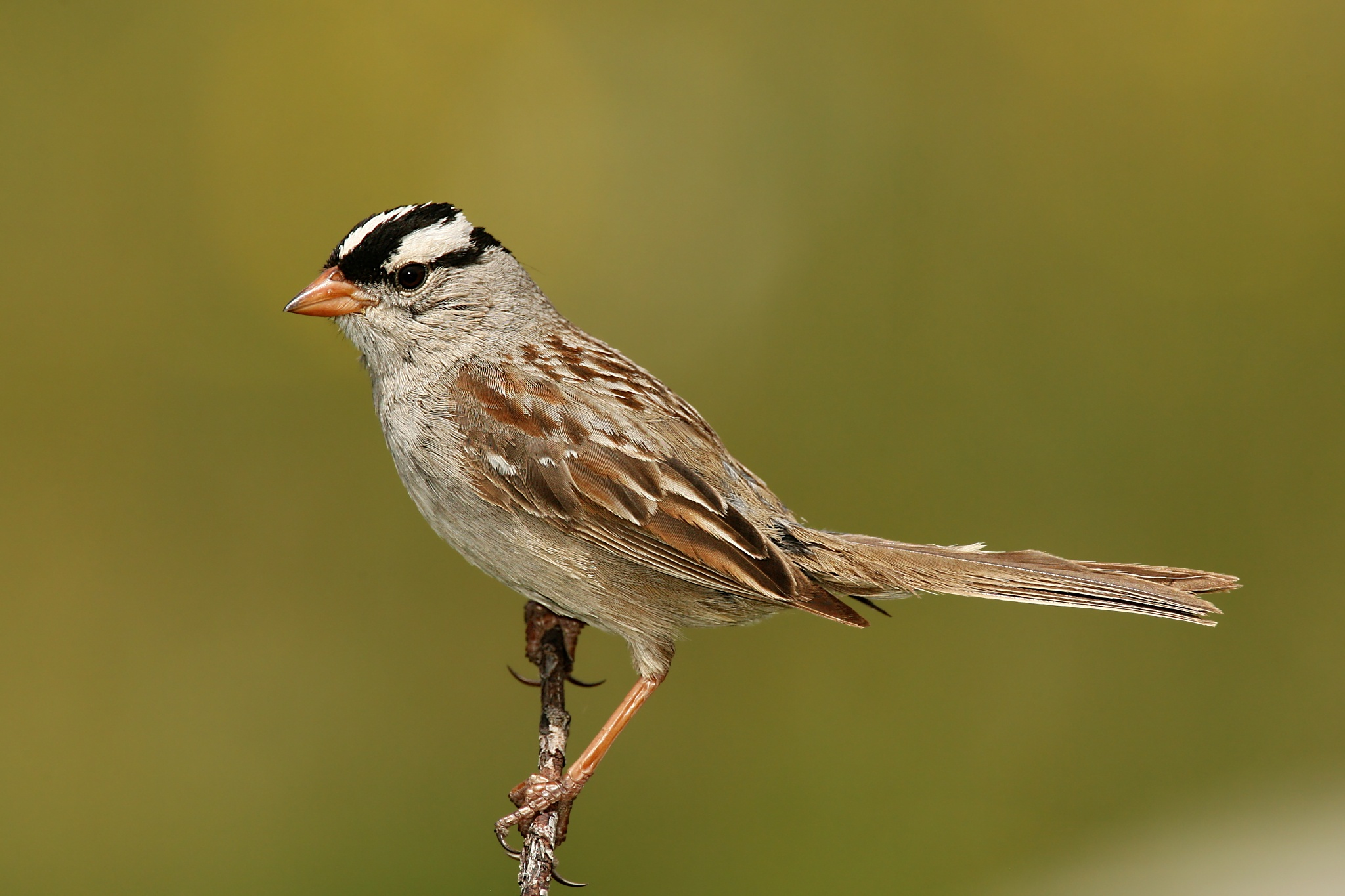
  - A living Zonotrichia leucophrys, or white-crowned sparrow
    †Zonotrichia leucophrys – or unidentified comparable form
- Zonulispira
  - †Zonulispira crocata
