= List of the prehistoric life of Florida =

This list of the prehistoric life of Florida contains the various prehistoric life-forms whose fossilized remains have been reported from within the US state of Florida.

== Precambrian ==
The Paleobiology Database records no known occurrences of Precambrian fossils in Florida.

== Paleozoic ==
- †Actinopteria
- †Acutiramus
  - †Acutiramus suwaneensis
- †Arisaigia
  - †Arisaigia postornata – or unidentified comparable form
- †Butovicella
  - †Butovicella migrans
- †Colpocoryphe
  - †Colpocoryphe exsul
- †Conularia
- †Eoschizodus
- †Modiomorpha
- †Plectonotus
- †Pleurodapis
- †Prothyris
- †Pterinopecten
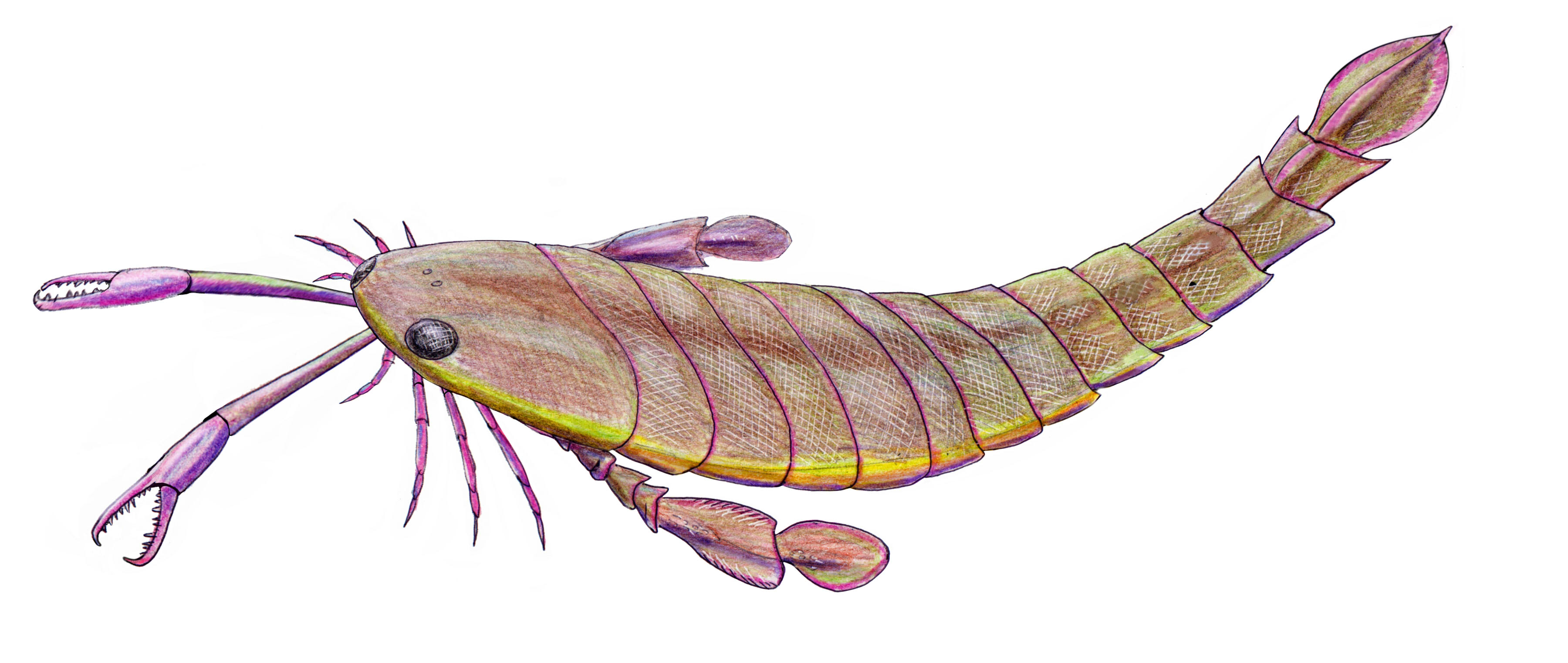
- Life restoration of the Silurian-Middle Devonian eurypterid ("sea scorpion") Pterygotus
  †Pterygotus
  - †Pterygotus floridanus
- †Tentaculites

== Mesozoic ==
The Paleobiology Database records no known occurrences of Mesozoic fossils in Florida.

== Cenozoic ==
=== Selected Cenozoic taxa of Florida ===
- Abra
- Acanthocardia
- Acanthochitona
- Acar
- Accipiter
  - Accipiter cooperii
  - Accipiter striatus
- Acer
  - Acer rubrum
- †Acmaturris
- Acris
  - †Acris gryllus – or unidentified comparable form
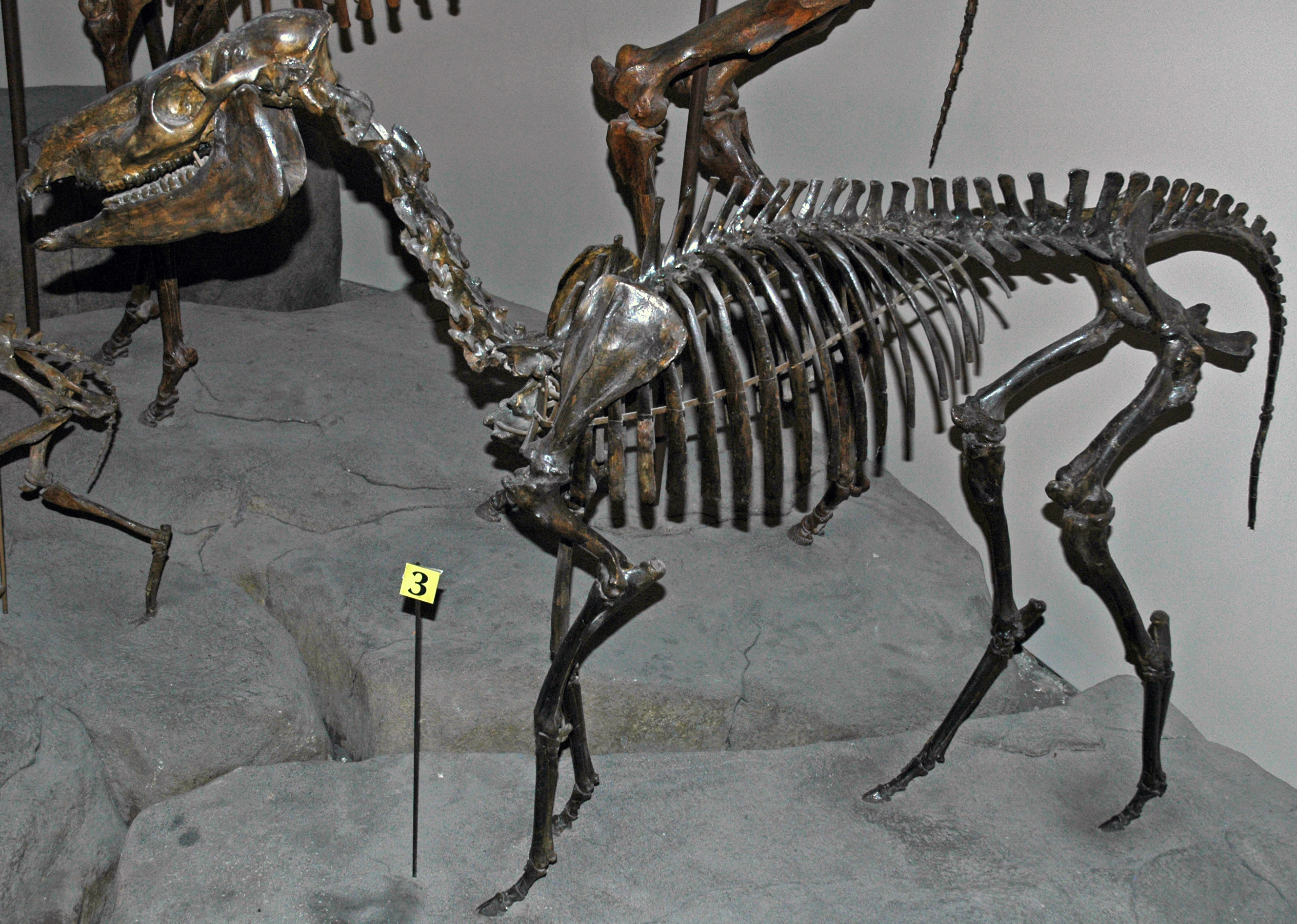
- Mounted fossilized skeleton of the Miocene horse Acritohippus
  †Acritohippus
  - †Acritohippus isonesus
- Acropora
  - Acropora cervicornis
  - Acropora palmata
- Acrosterigma
- Acteocina
- Acteon
- Actitis
  - †Actitis macularia
- Aegolius
  - Aegolius acadicus
- †Aelurodon
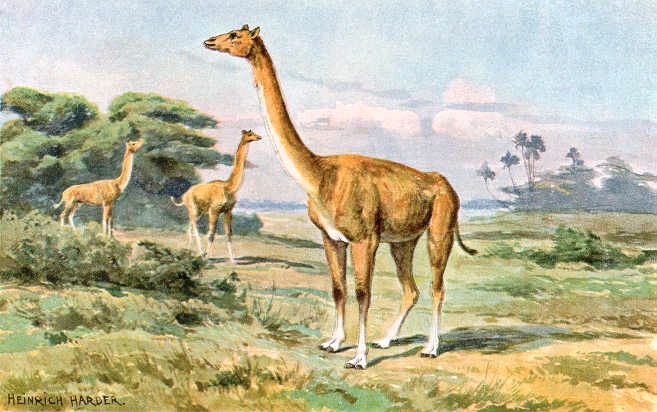
- Life restoration of the Miocene camel Aepycamelus, or the long-necked camel. Heinrich Harder (1920).
  †Aepycamelus
  - †Aepycamelus major
- Aequipecten
- Aesopus
- Aetobatus
  - Aetobatus narinari
- Agaricia
  - †Agaricia agaricites
- Agaronia
- Agassizia
- Agatrix
- Agelaius
  - Agelaius phoeniceus
- Agkistrodon
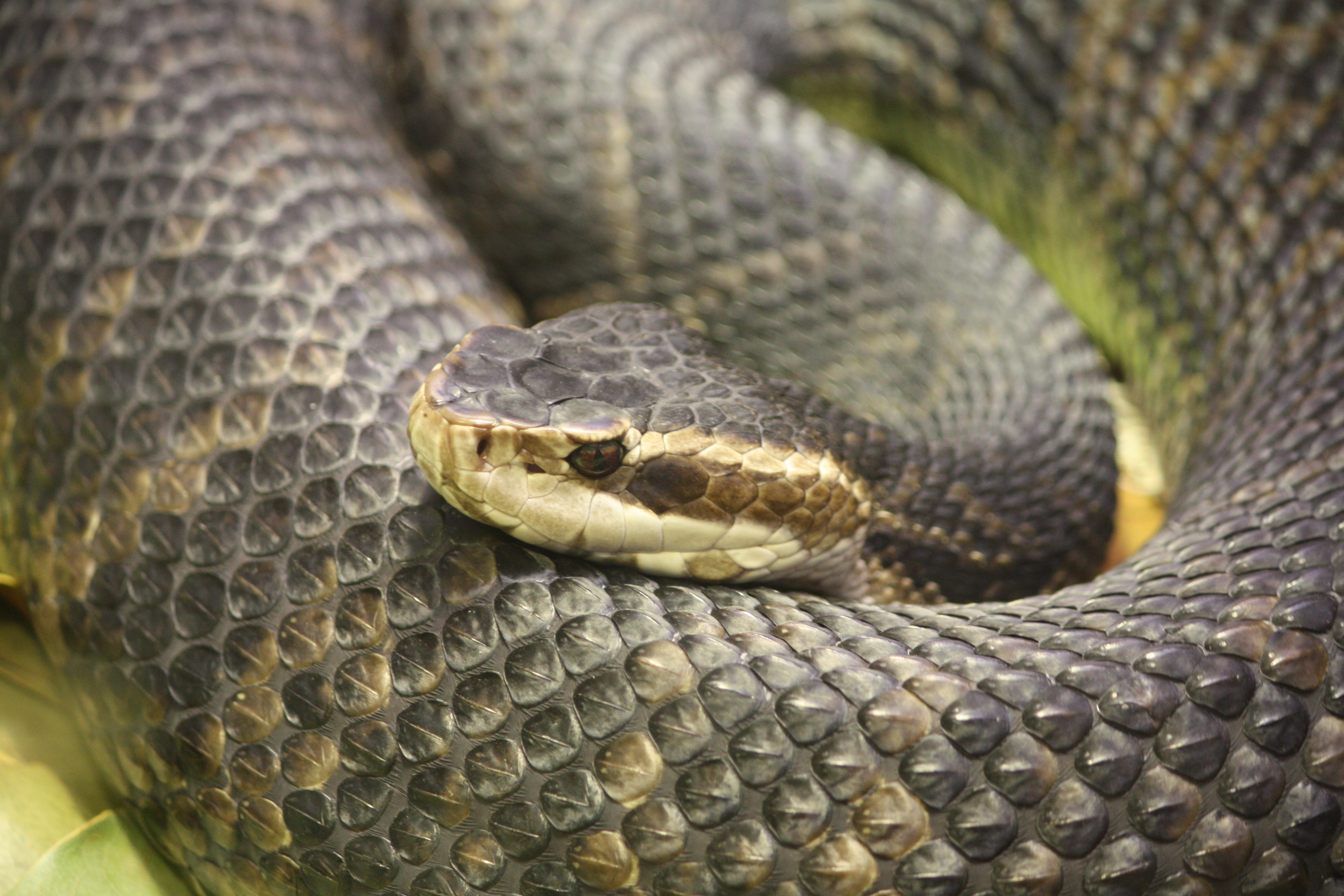
  - Close-up portrait of a living Agkistrodon piscivorus, also known as a water moccasin or cottonmouth
    Agkistrodon piscivorus
- Agladrillia
- †Agnotocastor
- †Agriotherium
- Aix
  - Aix sponsa
- Ajaia
  - Ajaia ajaja
- Alaba
- Alabina
- Alca – type locality for genus
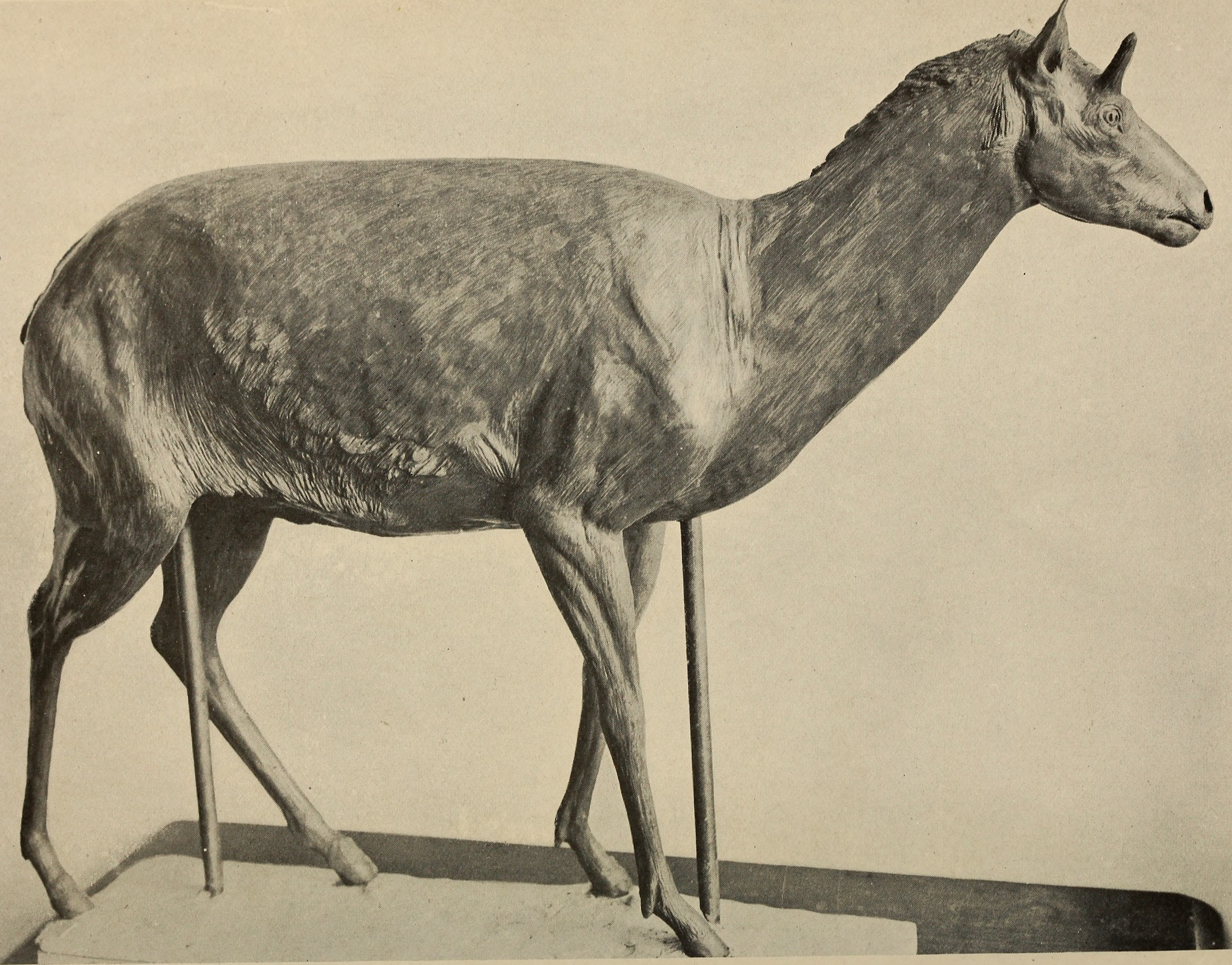
- Restorative model of the Miocene deer relative Aletomeryx
  †Aletomeryx
- Alligator
  - Alligator mississipiensis
  - Alligator mississippiensis
  - †Alligator olseni – type locality for species
- Alnus
- Alosa
- Alveopora
- Amauropsis – report made of unidentified related form or using admittedly obsolete nomenclature
- Ambystoma
  - Ambystoma tigrinum
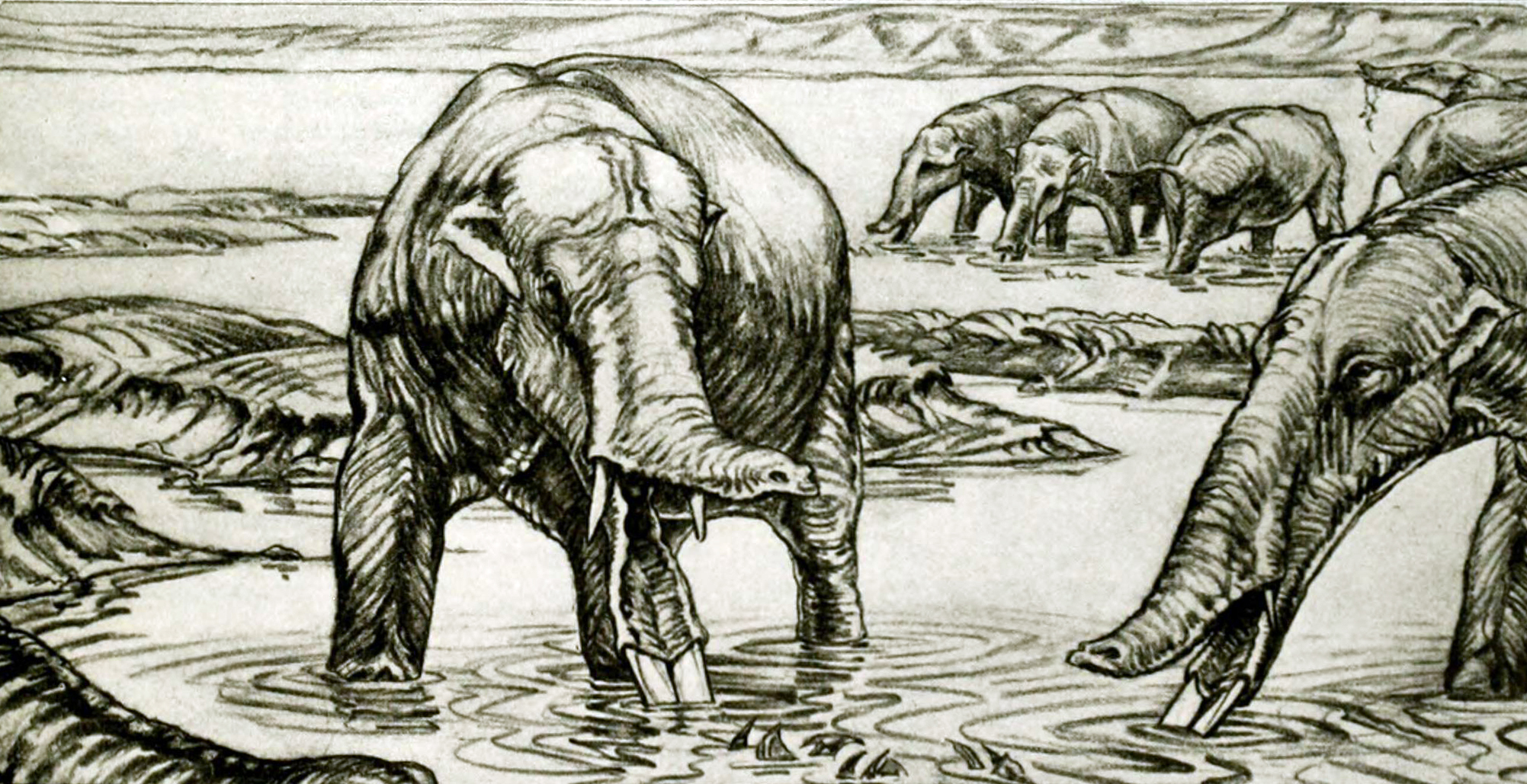
- Life restoration of the Miocene elephant relative Amebelodon. Margret Flinsch (1932).
  †Amebelodon
- Americardia
  - †Americardia media
- Amia
  - †Amia calva
- Ammodramus
  - †Ammodramus maritimus
  - †Ammodramus savannarum
- Amnicola
- †Amphicyon
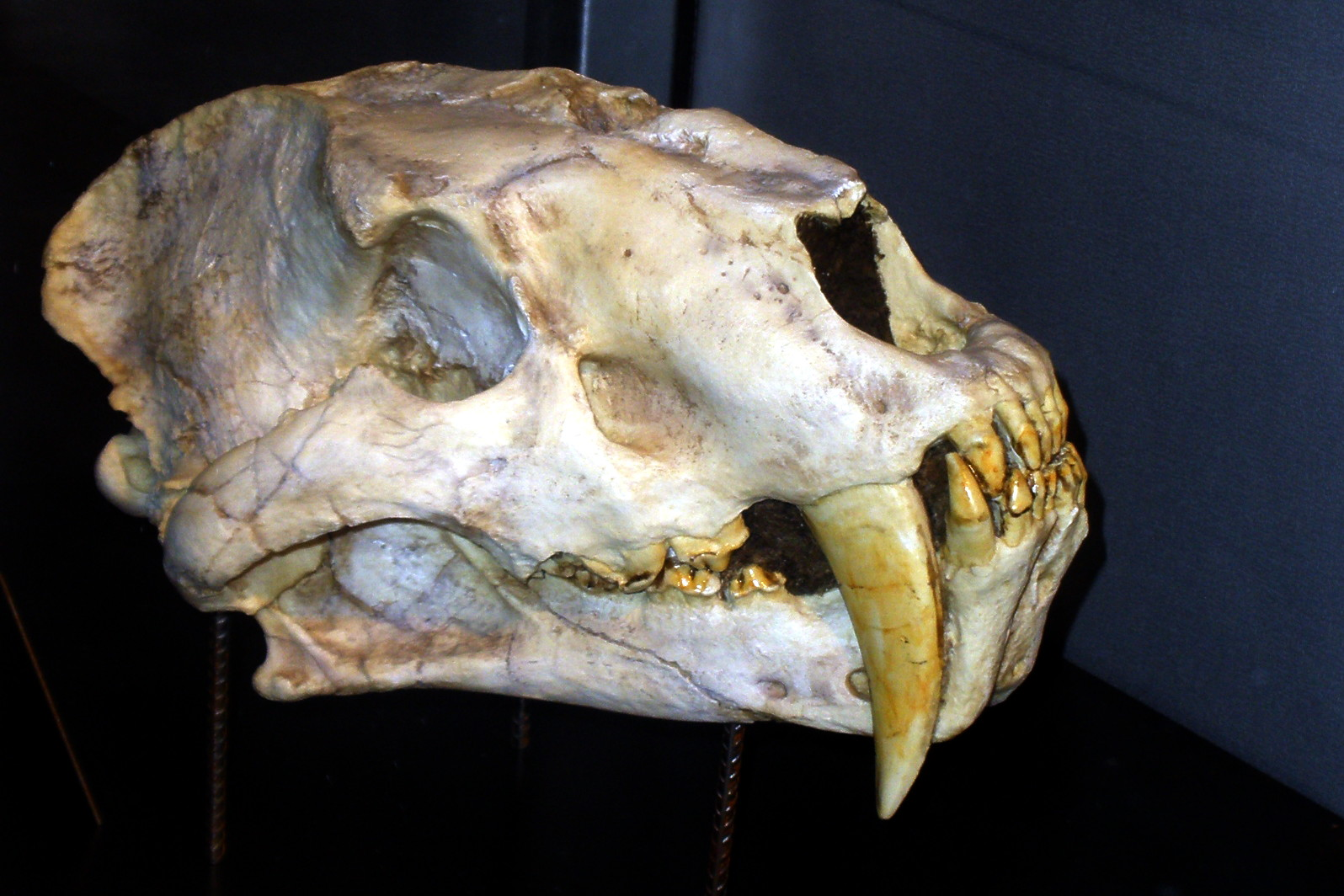
- Fossilized skull of the Miocene saber-toothed cat Amphimachairodus
  †Amphimachairodus
- †Amphiroa
- Amphistegina
- Amphiuma
  - †Amphiuma means
- †Amplibuteo
  - †Amplibuteo woodwardi
- Ampullina
- †Ampullinopsis
- Amusium
- †Anabernicula
- Anachis
- Anadara
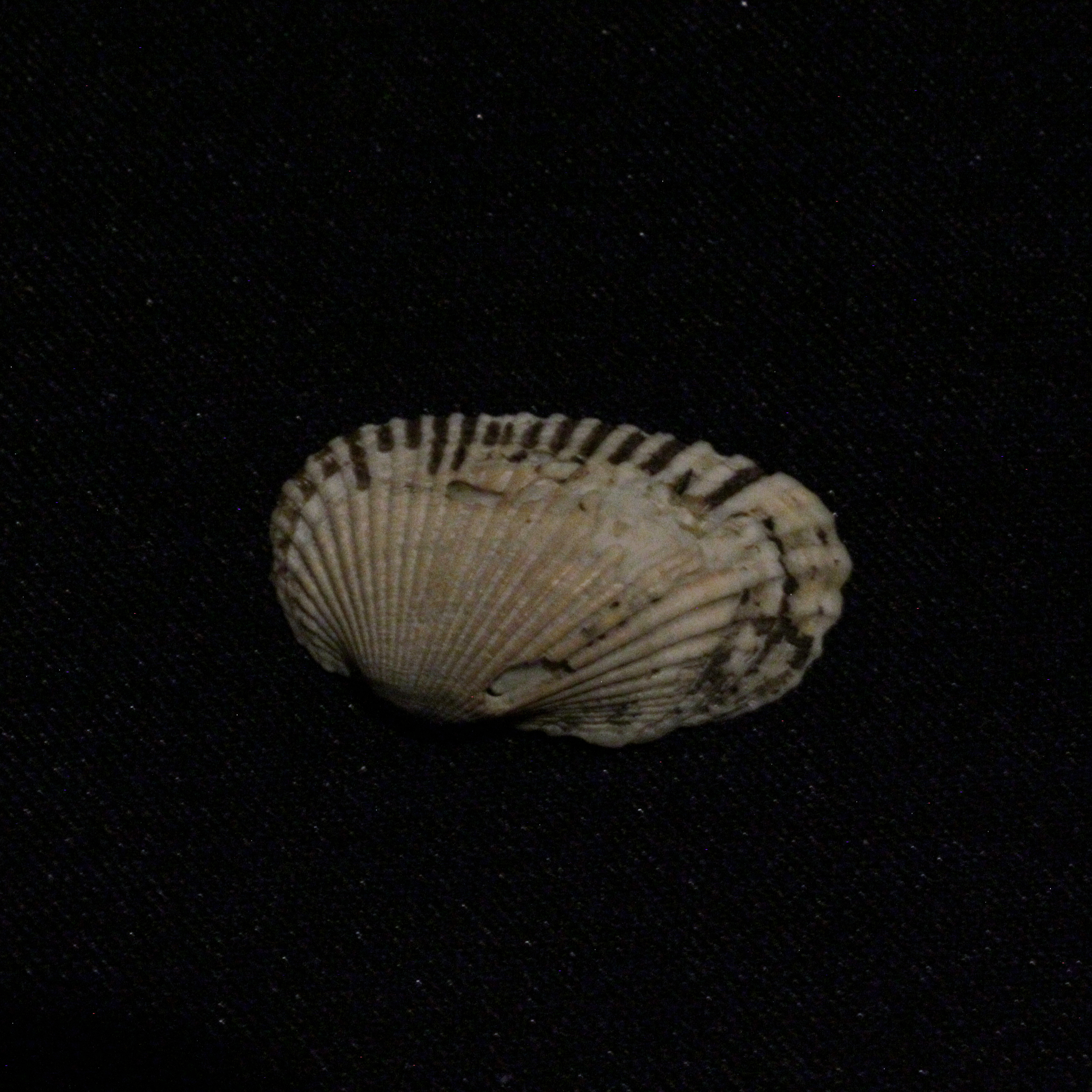
  - Shell of an Anadara floridana, or cut-ribbed ark clam
    †Anadara floridana
  - †Anadara ovalis
  - Anadara transversa
  - †Anadara trapezia
- Anas
  - Anas acuta
  - †Anas americana
  - †Anas carolinensis
  - †Anas clypeata
  - †Anas crecca
  - †Anas cyanoptera – or unidentified comparable form
  - †Anas discors
  - †Anas fulvigula
  - †Anas platyrhynchos
  - Anas rubripes
  - †Anas strepera
- Anatina
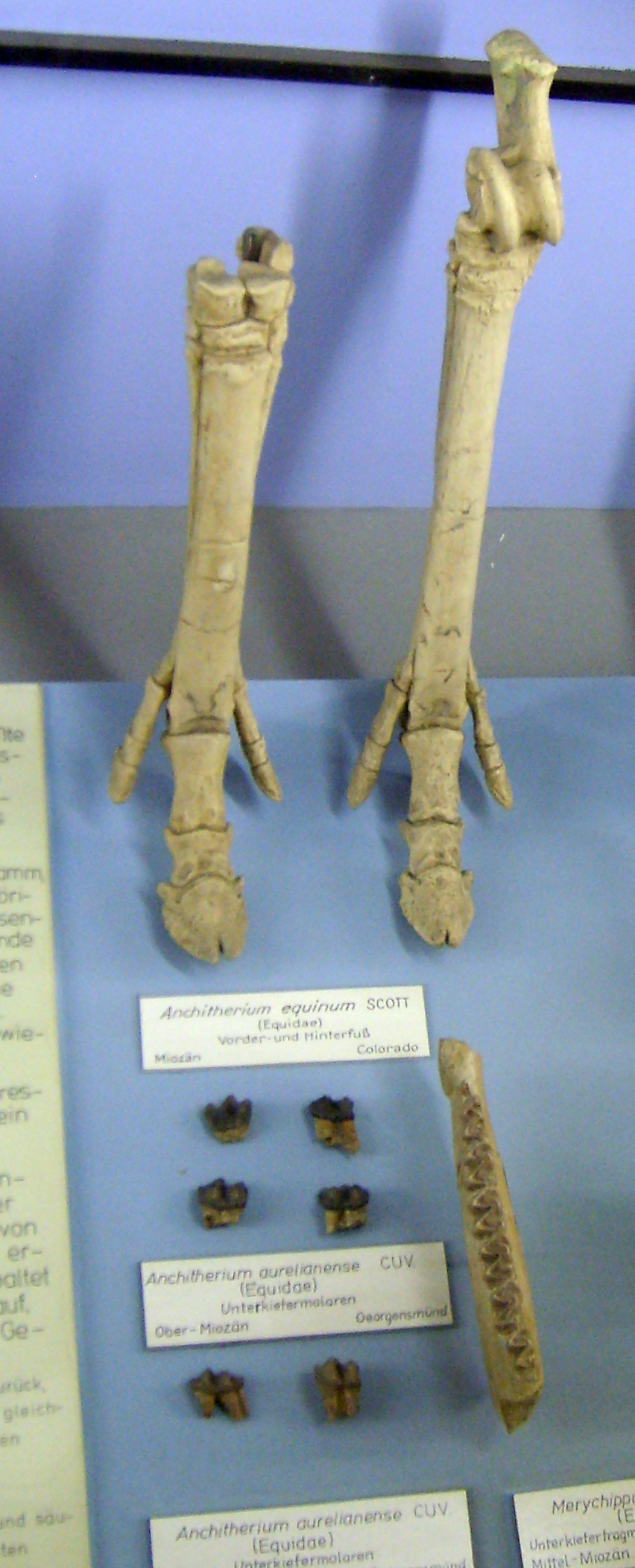
- Fossilized limb bones, and teeth of the Miocene three-toed horse Anchitherium (left)
  †Anchitherium
- Ancilla
- Angulus
- Anhinga
  - †Anhinga anhinga
- Anodonta
- Anodontia
  - †Anodontia alba
- Anolis
  - †Anolis carolinensis
- Anomia
  - †Anomia simplex
- Anona
- Antalis
- Anticlimax
- Antigona
- Antigone
  - Antigone canadensis
- Antillophos
  - †Antillophos candeanus – or unidentified comparable form
- Antrozous
- Aorotrema
  - †Aorotrema cistronium
- Apalone
  - Apalone ferox
- Aphelocoma
  - Aphelocoma coerulescens
- †Aphelops
- Aphera
- Aquila
  - †Aquila chrysaetos
- †Aramides
  - †Aramides cajanea
- Aramus
  - †Aramus guarauna
- Arbacia
- Arca
  - †Arca imbricata
  - Arca zebra
- †Archaeohippus
- Architectonica
- †Archosargus
  - †Archosargus probatocephalus
- Arcinella
  - Arcinella arcinella
  - Arcinella cornuta
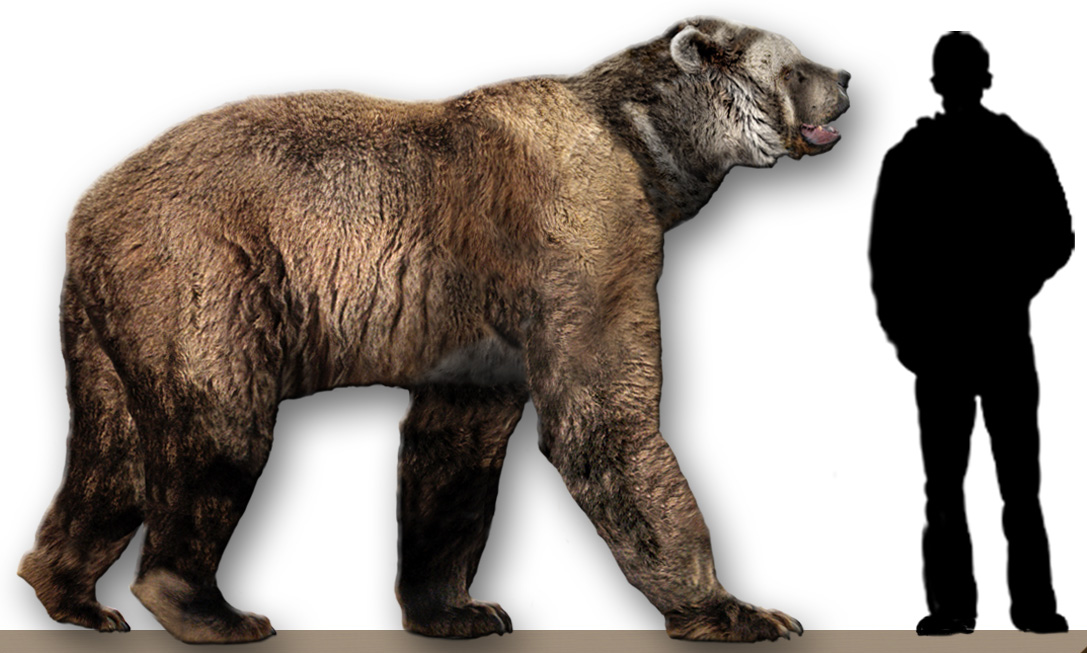
- Restoration of an Arctodus, or short-faced bear, with a human to scale
  †Arctodus
  - †Arctodus pristinus
- †Arctonasua
- Ardea
  - Ardea herodias
- Ardeola
- Argobuccinum – report made of unidentified related form or using admittedly obsolete nomenclature
- Argopecten
  - †Argopecten gibbus
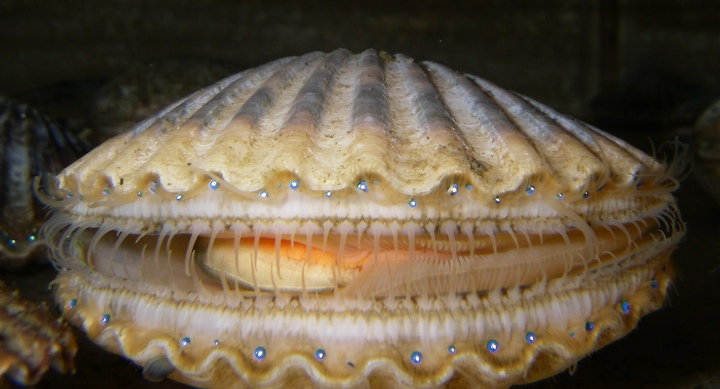
  - A living Argopecten irradians (formerly Aequipecten irradians), or Atlantic bay scallop
    †Argopecten irradians
- Arius
- Artena
- Asio
  - Asio flammeus
- Aspella
  - Aspella senex – type locality for species
- Assiminea
- Astarte
- Astraea
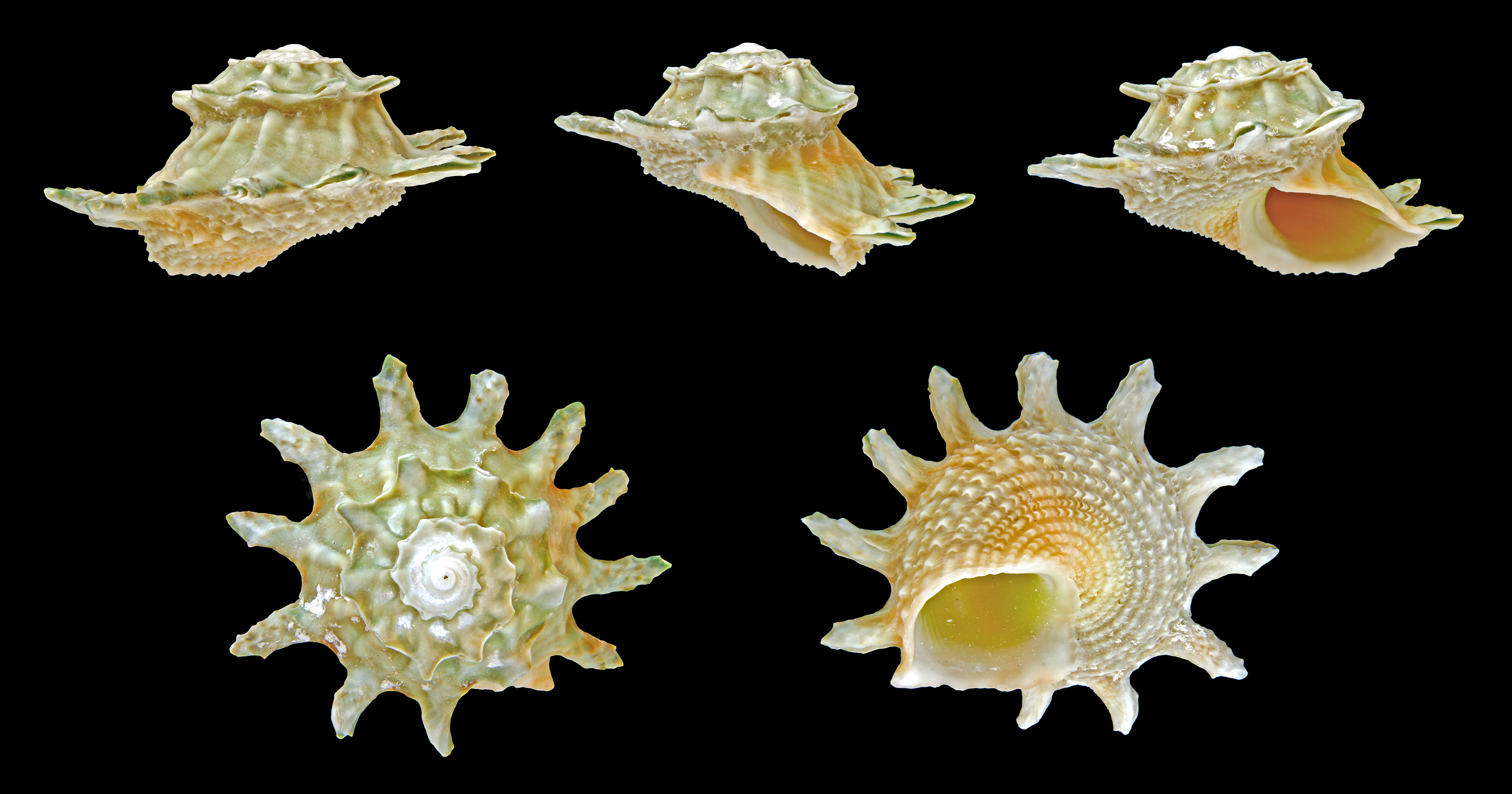
- Shell in multiple views of an Astralium, or star sea snail
  Astralium
  - †Astralium phoebium
- Astrangia
- †Astrohippus
- Astyris
  - †Astyris lunata
- †Athene cunicularia
- Athleta
- Atractosteus
  - †Atractosteus spatula
- Atrina
- Attiliosa
  - †Attiliosa aldridgei
- †Aturia
- Atys
- Axelella
- Aythya
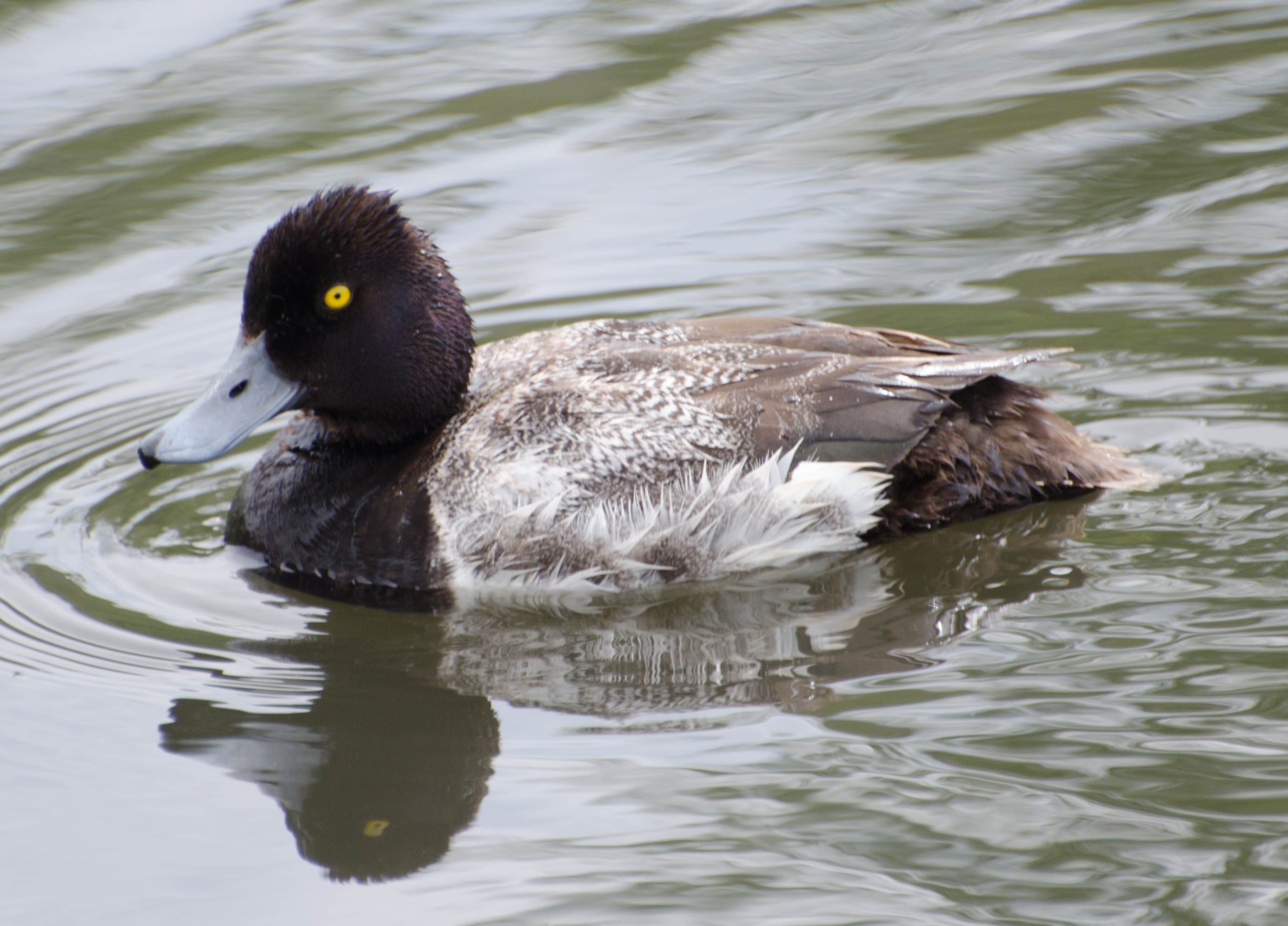
  - Lesser scaup
    †Aythya affinis
  - †Aythya americana
  - †Aythya collaris
  - †Aythya marila
  - †Aythya valisineria
- †Aztlanolagus
- †Babelomurex
- Bactridium
- Bailya
  - Bailya intricata
- Baiomys
- Bairdiella
  - †Bairdiella chrysoura
- Balaenoptera
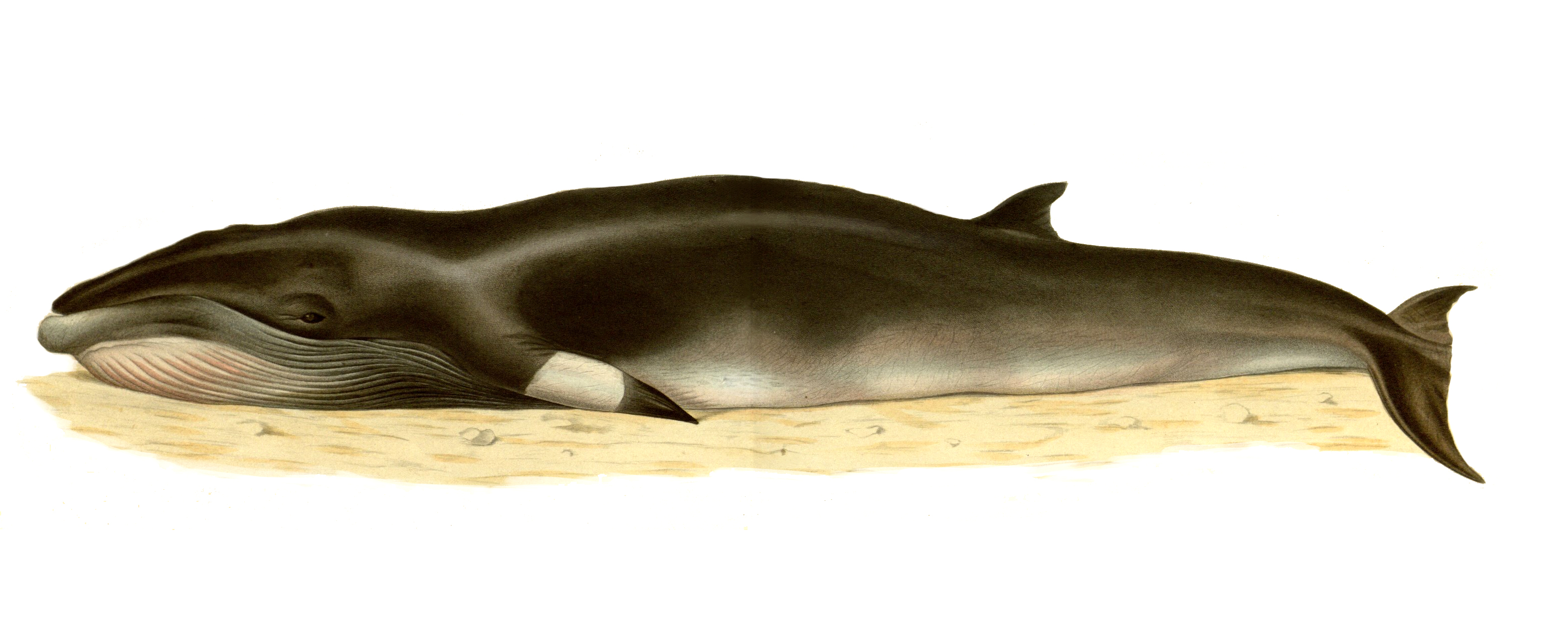
  - Illustration of a living Balaenoptera acutorostrata, or common minke whale
    Balaenoptera acutorostrata
- Balanus
  - †Balanus improvisus – or unidentified related form
  - †Balanus trigonus
- Balistes
- Barbatia
  - Barbatia candida
- †Barbourofelis
- Bartschella
- Basilicus – or unidentified comparable form
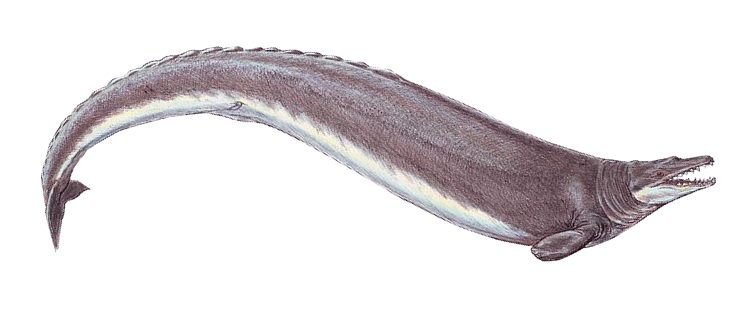
- Life restoration of the Eocene whale Basilosaurus
  †Basilosaurus
  - †Basilosaurus cetoides
- Batillaria
- †Batrachosauroides
- Bela
  - †Bela nassoides – type locality for species
- †Benzoin
  - †Benzoin melissaefolium – or unidentified comparable form
- Biomphalaria
  - †Biomphalaria havanensis
- Bison
  - †Bison antiquus
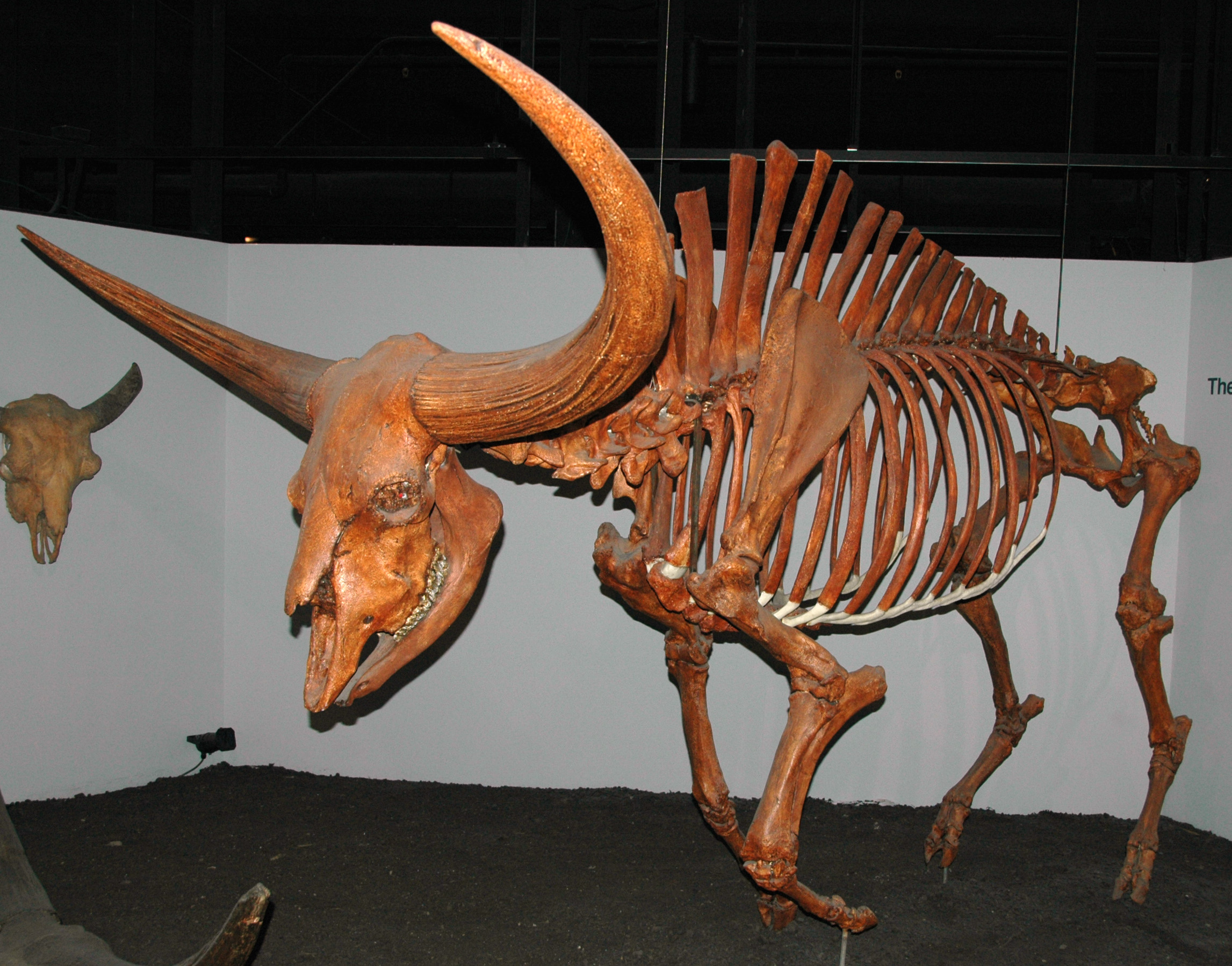
  - Mounted fossilized skeleton of the Pleistocene Bison latifrons, also known as the giant bison or long-horned bison
    †Bison latifrons
- Bittiolum
  - Bittiolum varium
- Bittium
- Bivetopsia
- Blarina
  - Blarina brevicauda
  - Blarina carolinensis
- †Blastomeryx
- Boa
  - Boa constrictor – type locality for species
- Bonasa
  - †Bonasa umbellus
- Boonea
  - †Boonea seminuda
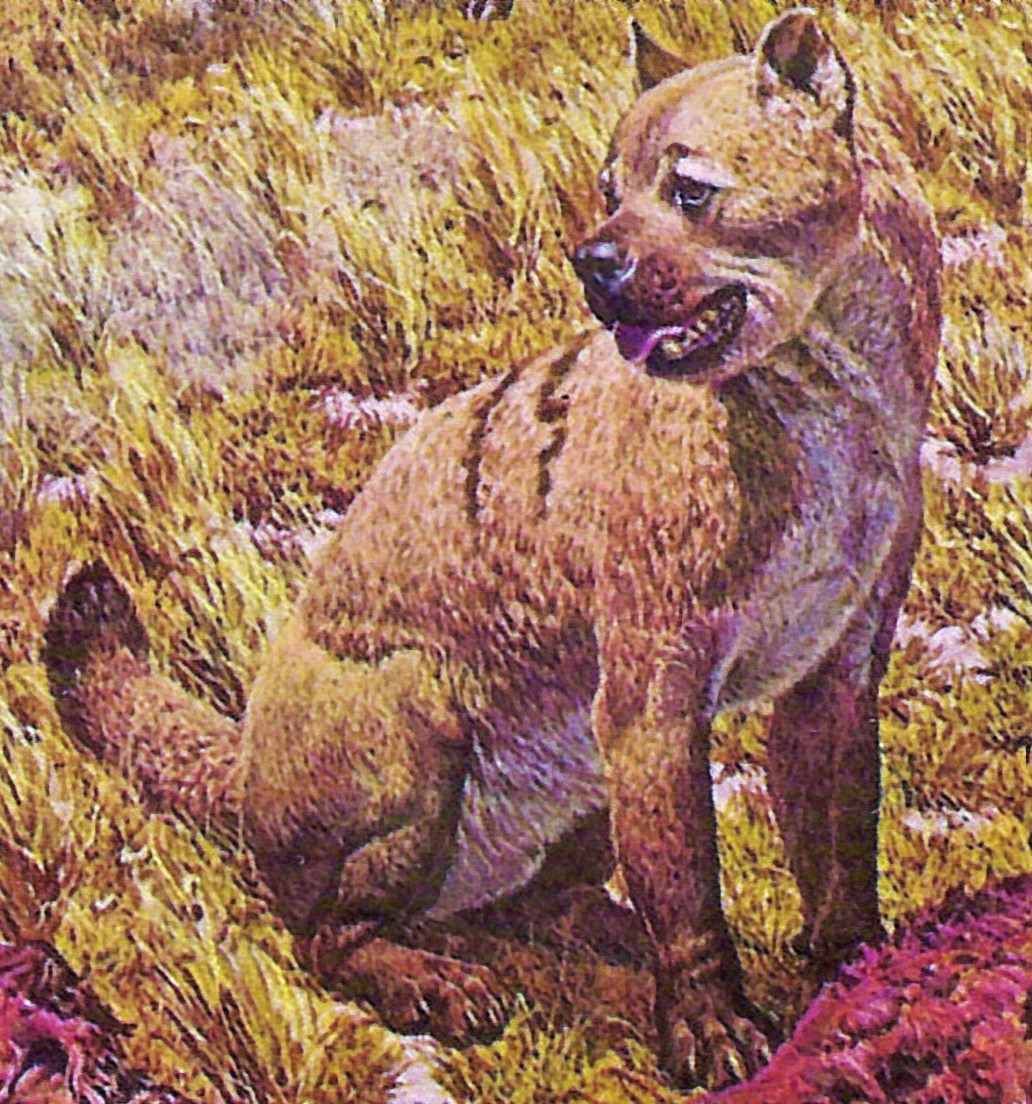
- Restoration of two of the Miocene-Pliocene bone-crushing dog genus Borophagus preying on a camel. Jay Matternes (1964).
  †Borophagus
  - †Borophagus diversidens
  - †Borophagus hilli
  - †Borophagus orc
  - †Borophagus pugnator
- Bostrycapulus
  - †Bostrycapulus aculeatus
- Botaurus
  - †Botaurus lentiginosus
- †Bothriodon
- Botula
  - †Botula fusca
- Brachidontes
  - †Brachidontes exustus
- †Brachycythara
  - †Brachycythara dasa – type locality for species
- †Brana
- Branta
  - Branta canadensis
- †Brasenia
- Bubo
  - Bubo virginianus
- Buccella
- Buccinum
- Bucephala
  - Bucephala albeola
- Buchema
- Bufo
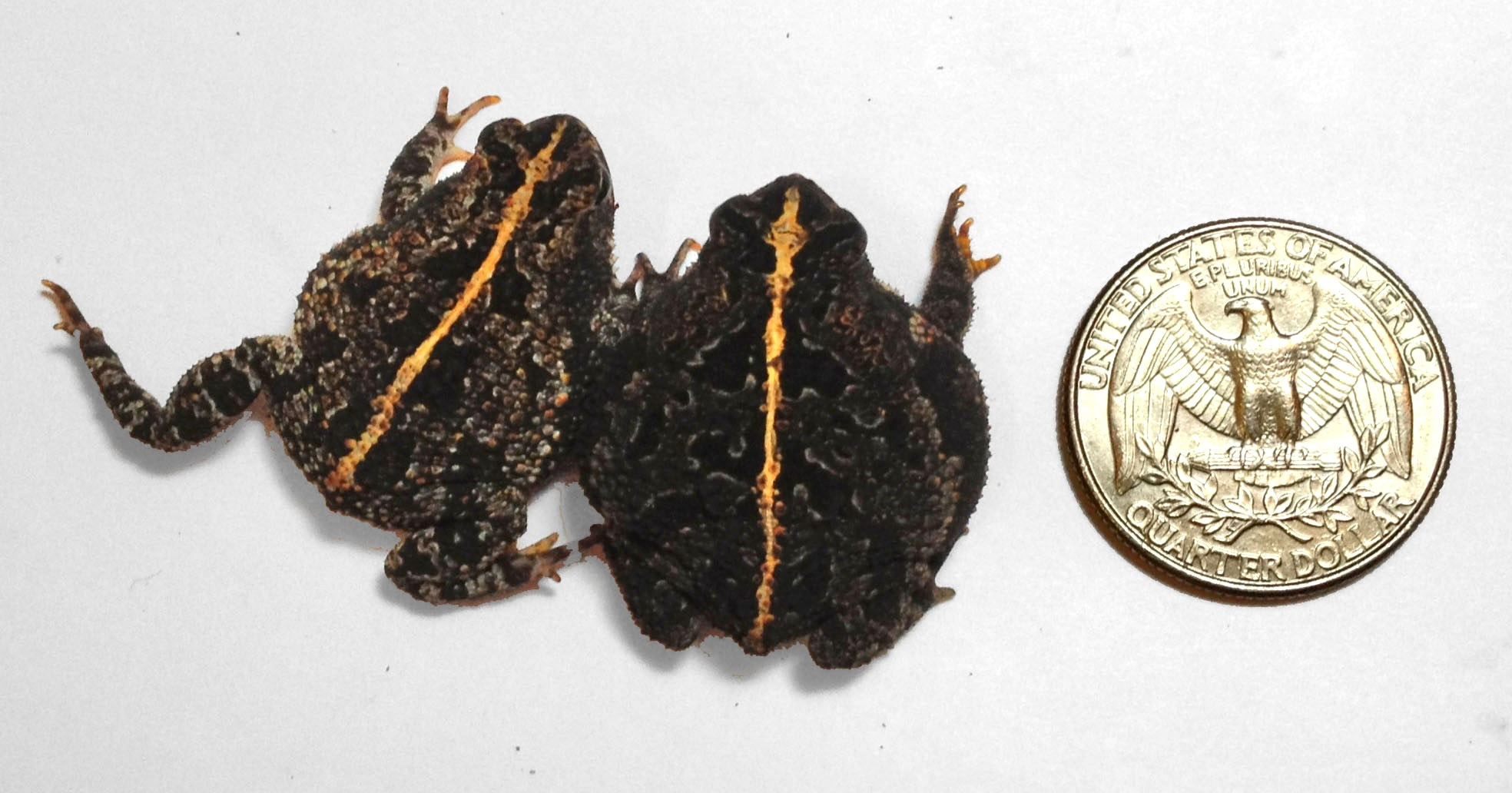
  - Living male (left) and female (right) Anaxyrus quercicus, or oak toads
    †Bufo quercicus
  - Bufo terrestris
  - †Bufo woodhousei
- Bulimulus
- Bulla
  - †Bulla striata
- Bullaria
- Bursa
  - †Bursa rhodostoma
  - †Bursa rugosa
- Busycon
  - Busycon carica
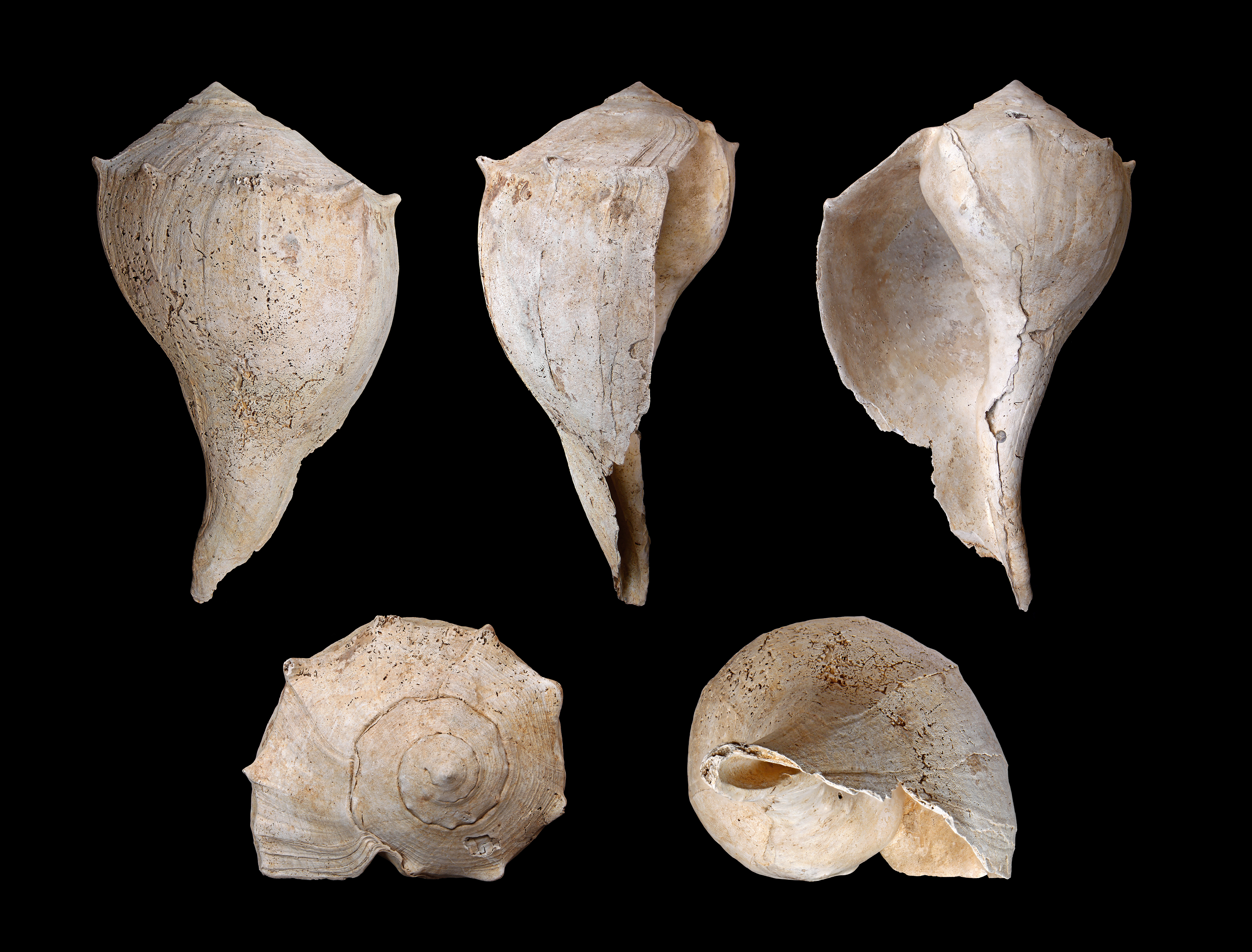
  - Shell in multiple views of a Busycon contrarium whelk
    †Busycon contrarium
  - †Busycon perversum
  - †Busycon sinistrum
- Busycotypus
  - †Busycotypus canaliculatus
- Buteo
  - Buteo jamaicensis
  - Buteo lineatus
  - †Buteo platypterus
  - †Buteo swainsoni
- Buteogallus
  - †Buteogallus concordatus
  - †Buteogallus fragilis
  - Buteogallus urubitinga
- Butorides
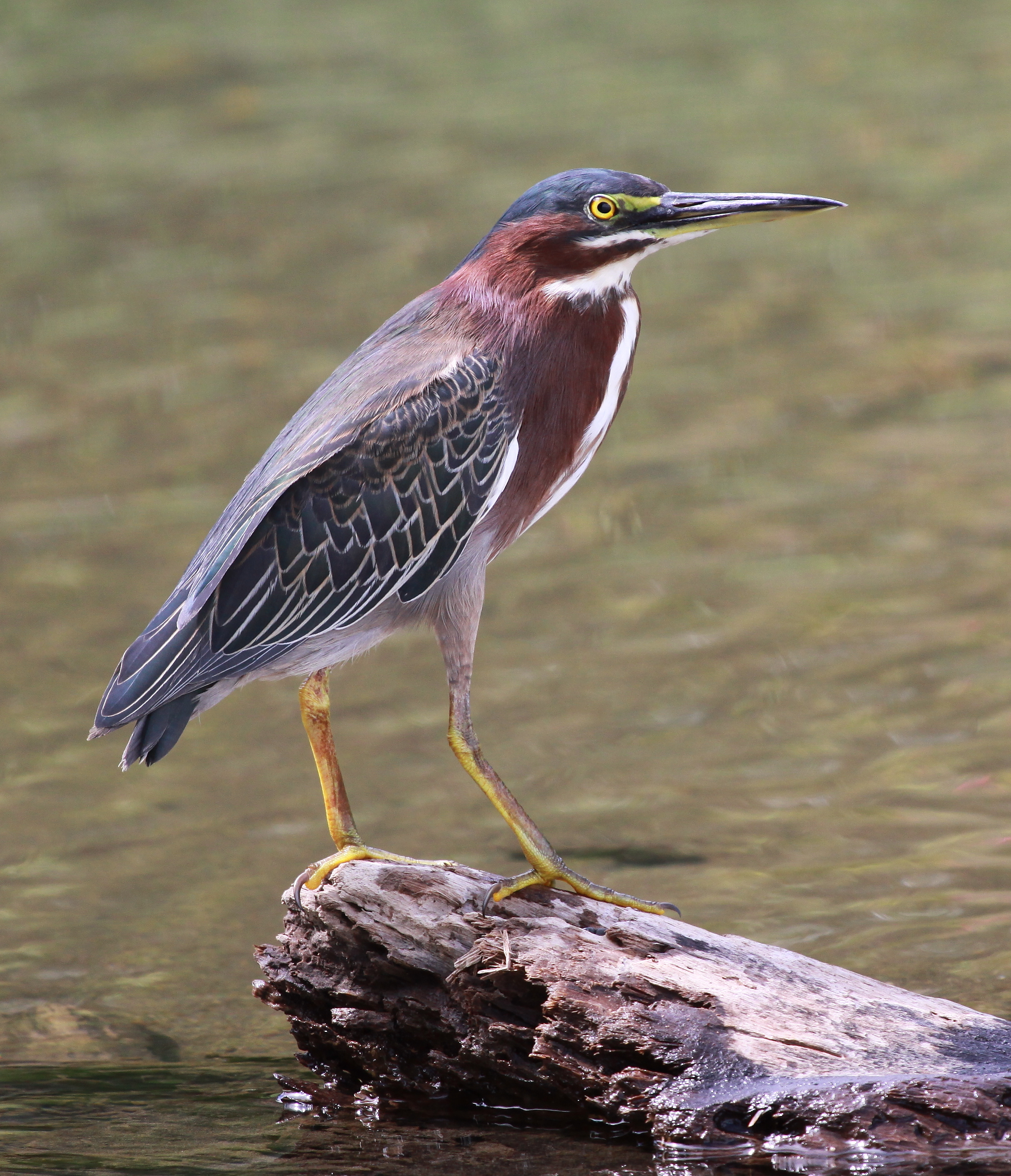
  - A living Butorides virescens, or green heron
    †Butorides virescens
- Cadulus
- Caecum
  - †Caecum cinctum
  - †Caecum circumvolutum
  - †Caecum cooperi
  - †Caecum cycloferum
  - Caecum floridanum
  - †Caecum imbricatum
  - †Caecum pulchellum
  - Caecum regulare
  - Caecum strigosum
- Calidris
  - †Calidris canutus – or unidentified comparable form
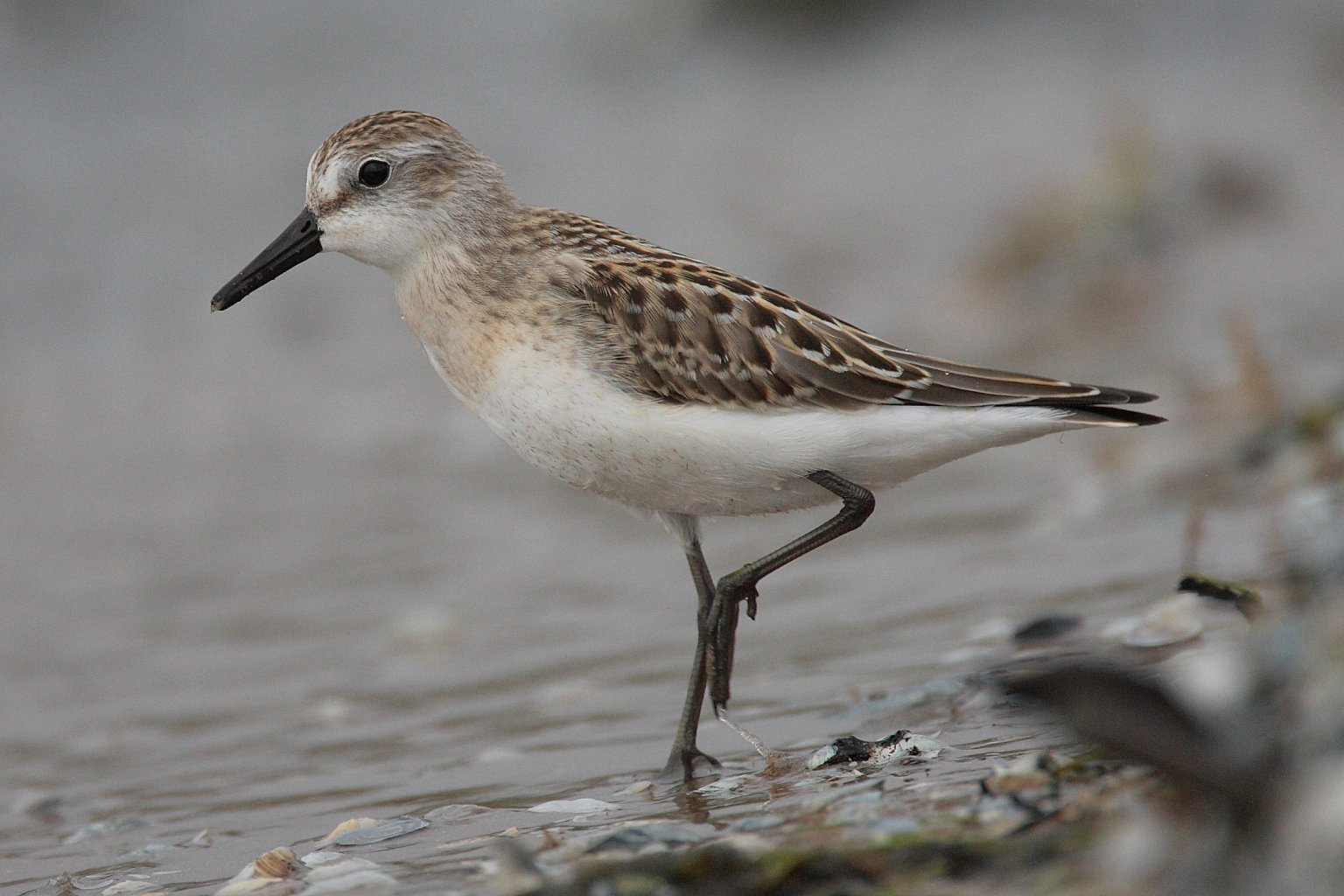
  - A living Calidris pusilla, or semipalmated sandpiper
    †Calidris pusilla – or unidentified comparable form
- †Calippus
- Callianassa
- Calliostoma
  - †Calliostoma euglyptum
  - †Calliostoma jujubinum
  - †Calliostoma pulchrum
  - †Calliostoma roseolum
  - †Calliostoma tampaense
  - †Calliostoma yucatecanum – or unidentified comparable form
- Callista
- †Callophoca
- Calotrophon
  - †Calotrophon ostrearum
- Calyptraea
  - †Calyptraea centralis
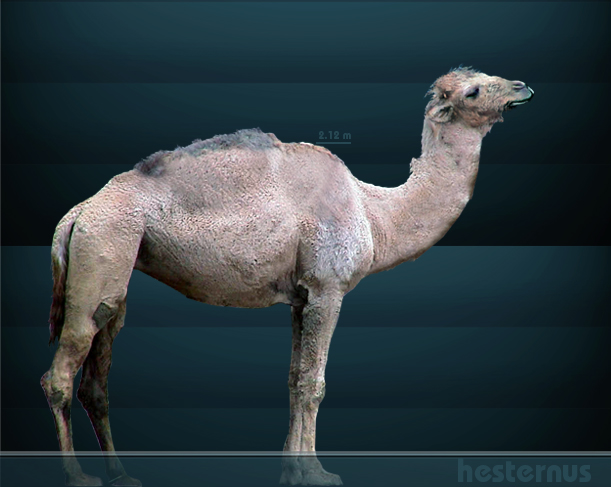
- Life restoration of the Pliocene-Holocene camel Camelops
  †Camelops
- Cancellaria
  - Cancellaria reticulata
- Cancilla
- Canis
  - †Canis armbrusteri
  - †Canis dirus – type locality for species
  - †Canis edwardii
  - Canis familiaris
  - Canis latrans - reintroduced
  - †Canis lepophagus
  - Canis lupus
  - Canis rufus
- Cantharus
- Capella
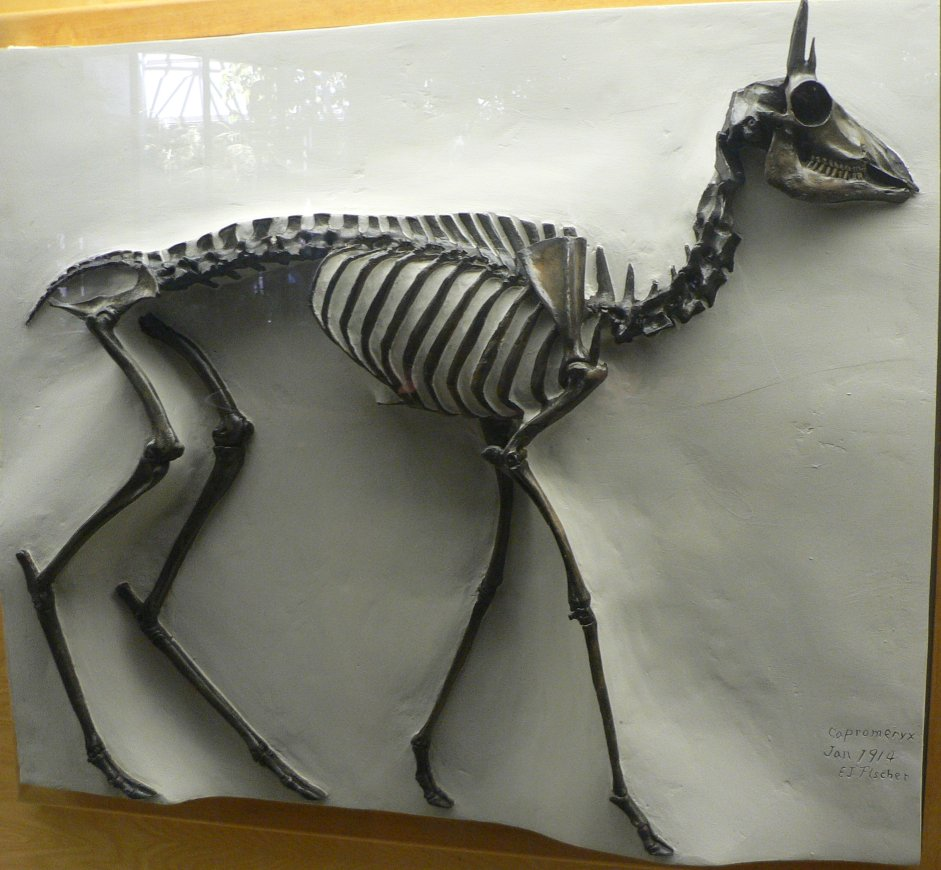
- Fossilized skeleton of the Pleistocene dwarf pronghorn Capromeryx
  †Capromeryx
- Capulus
- Caracara
  - †Caracara cheriway
  - †Caracara plancus
- Caranx
  - †Caranx hippos
- Carcharhinus
  - Carcharhinus brevipinna
  - Carcharhinus leucas
  - Carcharhinus limbatus
  - Carcharhinus plumbeus
  - Carcharhinus signatus
- Carcharias
  - Carcharias taurus
- Carcharodon
  - †Carcharodon carcharias
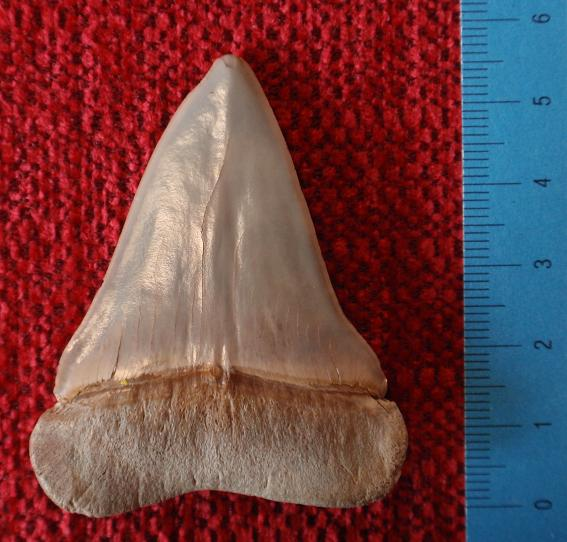
  - Fossilized tooth of the Miocene-Pliocene shark Cosmopolitodus hastalis, or broad-toothed mako
    †Carcharodon hastalis
- Cardinalis
  - Cardinalis cardinalis
- Cardita
- Carditamera
- Caretta
  - †Caretta caretta
- Carex
- Carinodrillia
- †Carpella
- Carphophis
  - †Carphophis amoenus
- †Carpocyon
- Carya
- Carychium
- †Casmerodius
  - Casmerodius albus
- Cassidulina
- Cassis
  - Cassis madagascariensis
- Castanea
- Castor
  - Castor californicus
  - Castor canadensis
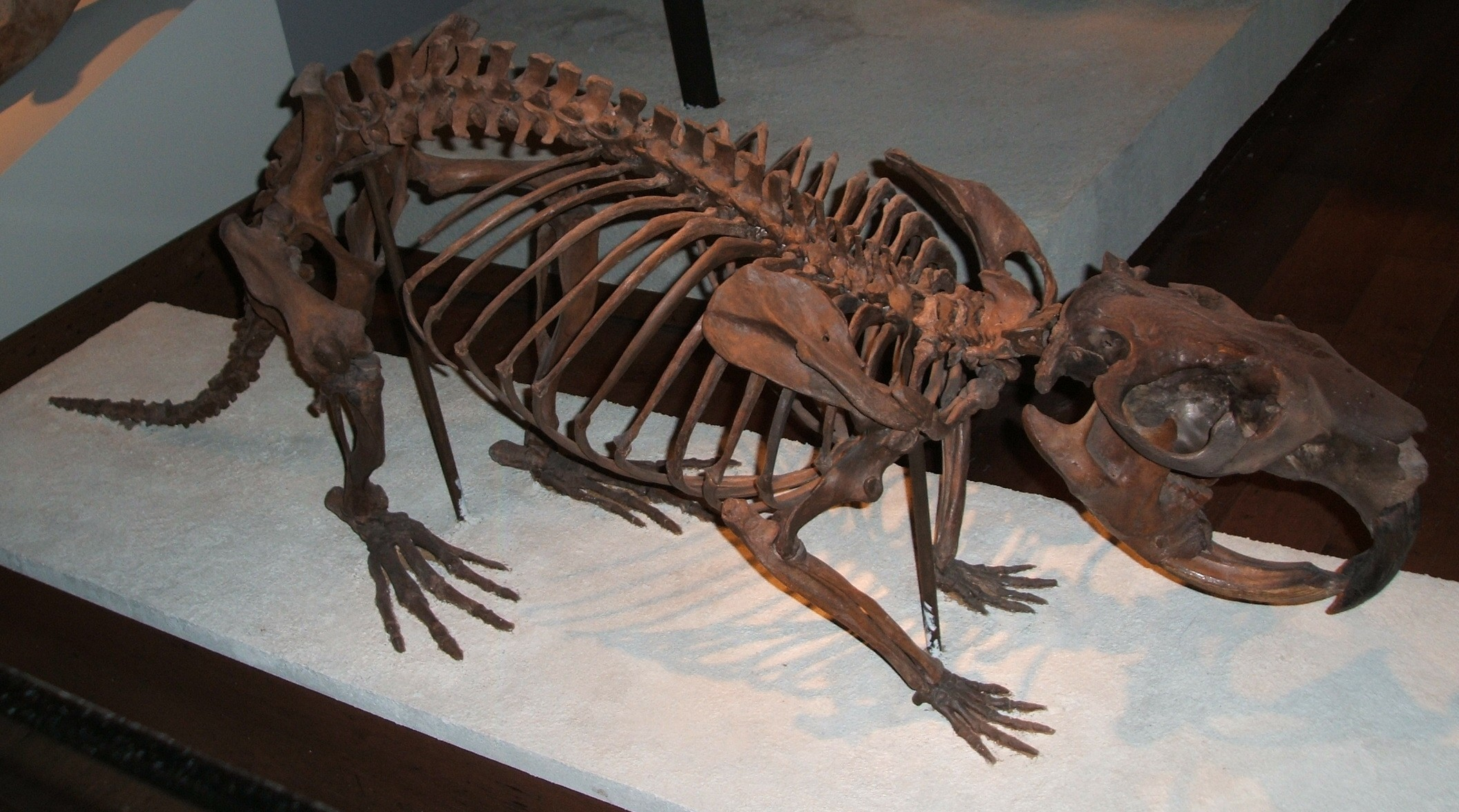
- Mounted fossilized skeleton of the Pliocene-Pleistocene giant beaver Castoroides
  †Castoroides
  - †Castoroides leiseyorum – type locality for species
  - †Castoroides ohioensis
- Cathartes
  - †Cathartes aura
- Catharus
- Centropomus
- Cerastoderma
- †Cerion
- Cerithidea
  - Cerithidea pliculosa
  - Cerithidea scalariformis
- Cerithioclava
- Cerithiopsis
  - †Cerithiopsis aralia
  - †Cerithiopsis greenii
  - †Cerithiopsis vinca
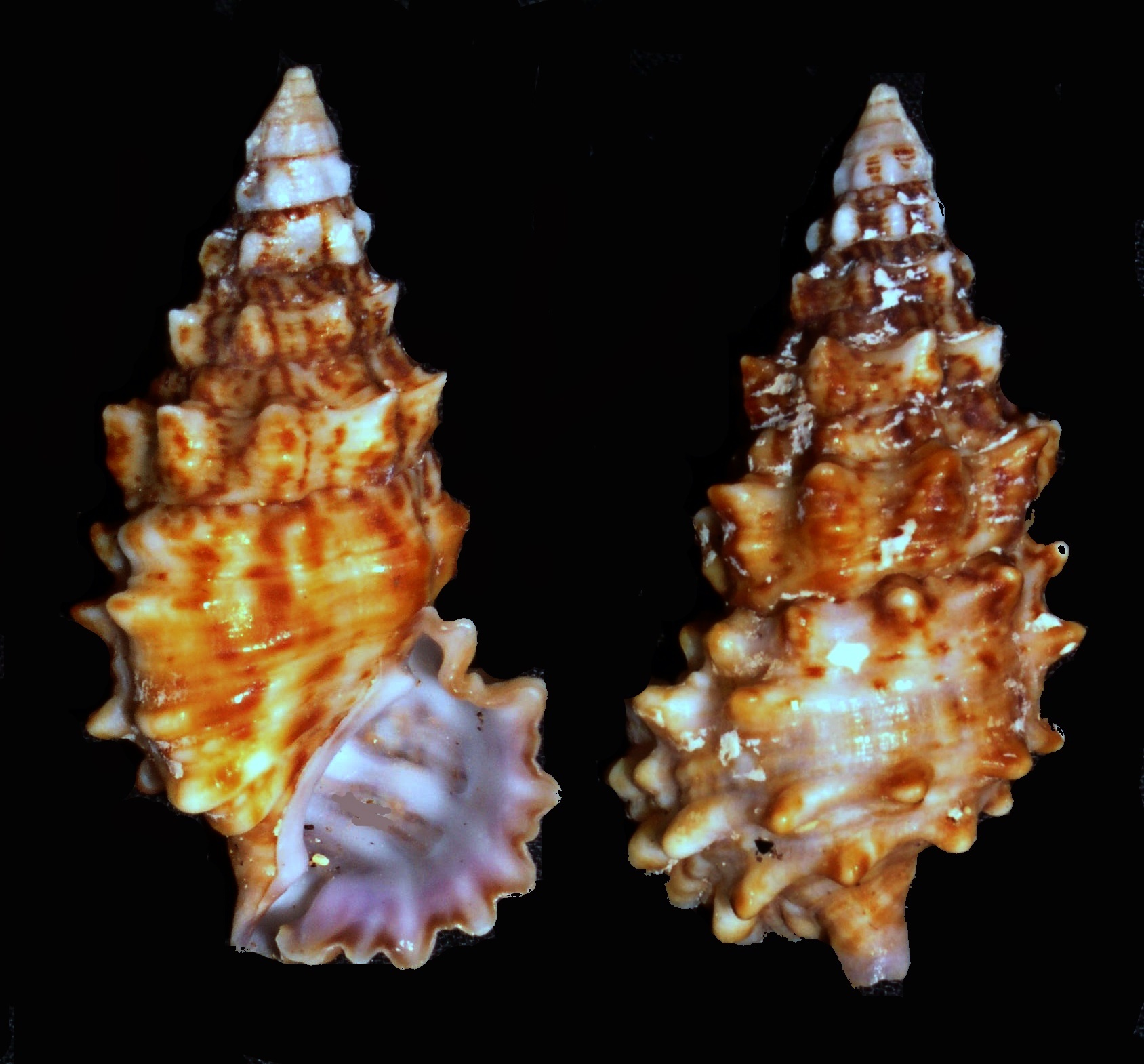
- Two views of a Cerithium cerith sea snail
  Cerithium
  - †Cerithium atratum
  - †Cerithium eburneum
  - †Cerithium georgianum – or unidentified related form
  - †Cerithium guinaicum
  - †Cerithium lutosum
  - †Cerithium muscarum
- Cerodrillia
  - †Cerodrillia simpsoni
- Ceryle
- Chaetopleura
  - †Chaetopleura apiculata
- Chama
  - †Chama congregata
  - †Chama macerophylla
- Chamelea
- Charadrius
  - †Charadrius vociferus
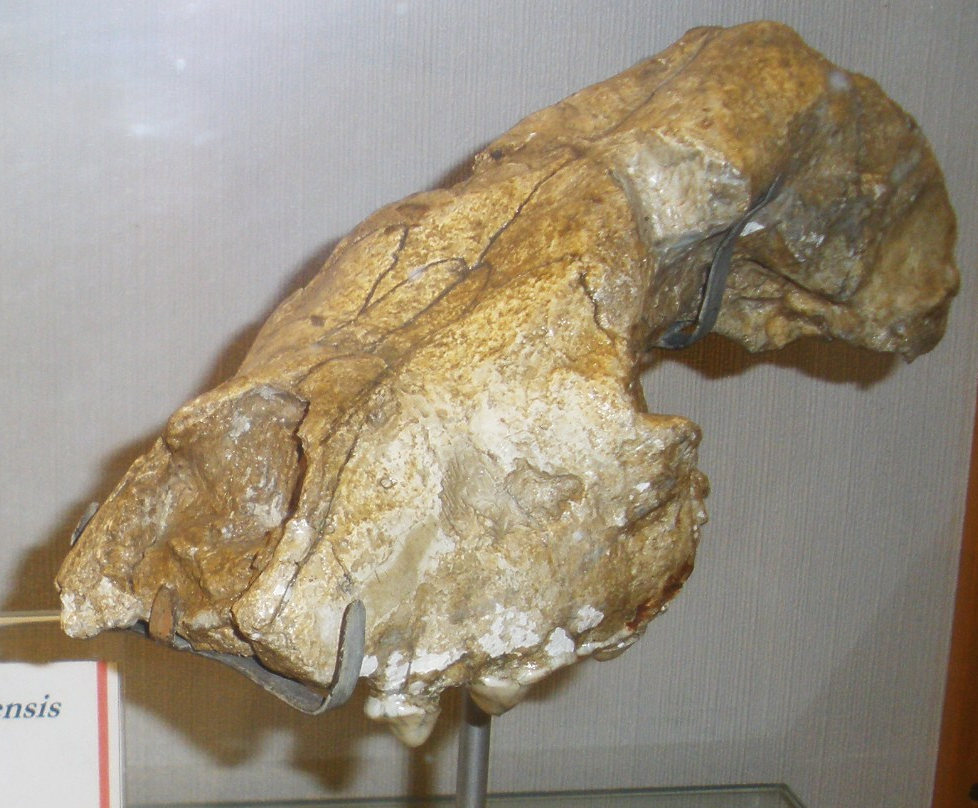
- Fossilized cranium of the Pliocene-Pleistocene hyena Chasmaporthetes
  †Chasmaporthetes
- Cheilea
- Chelonia
  - †Chelonia mydas
- Chelonibia
  - †Chelonibia testudinaria
- Chelydra
  - †Chelydra serpentina
- Chemnitzia
- †Chesapecten
  - †Chesapecten jeffersonius
- Chicoreus
  - †Chicoreus brevifrons
  - †Chicoreus dilectus
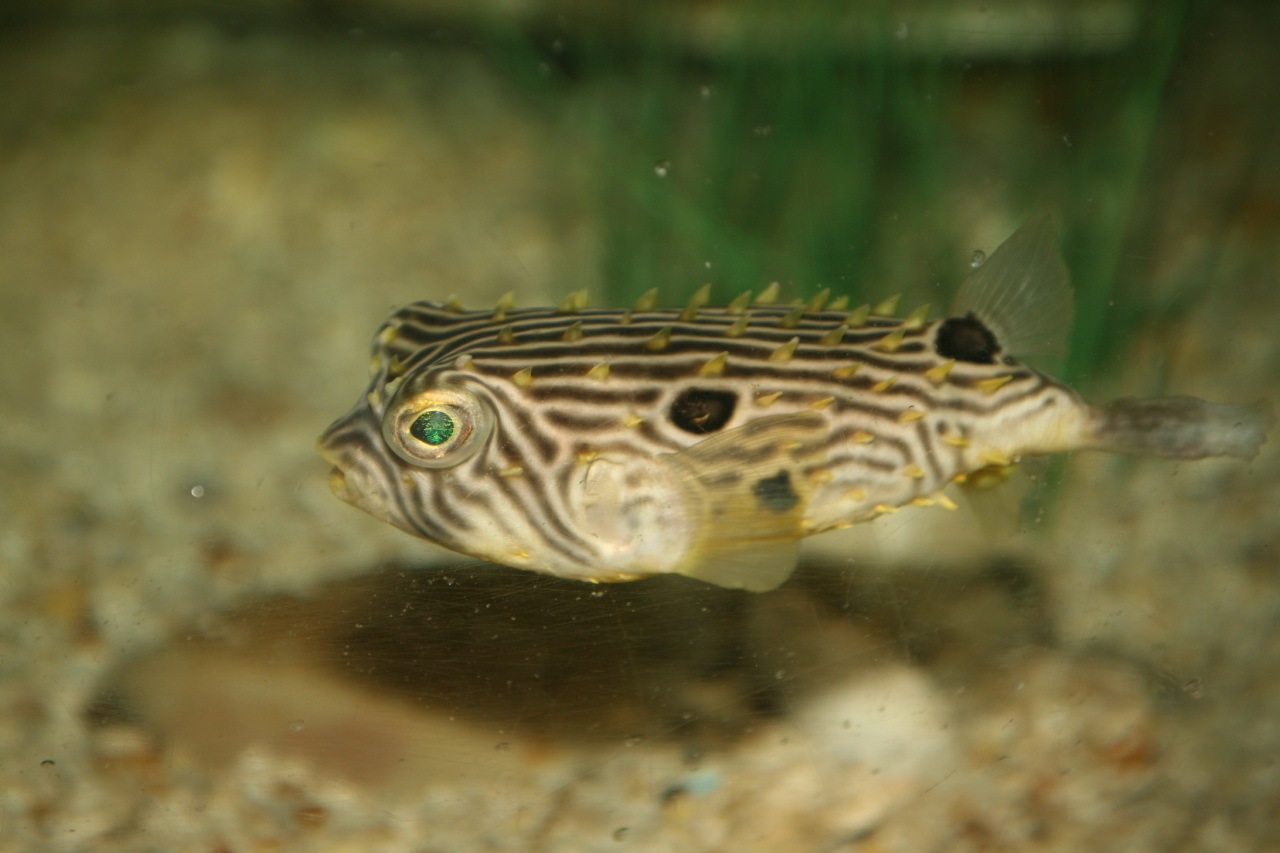
- A living Chilomycterus, or burrfish
  Chilomycterus
- Chione
  - †Chione bainbridgensis
  - †Chione craspedonia
  - Chione elevata
  - †Chione erosa
- Chlamys
- Chlorostoma
- Chondestes – or unidentified comparable form
  - †Chondestes grammacus
- Chrysallida
- Chrysemys
  - †Chrysemys floridana
- Cibicides
- Ciconia
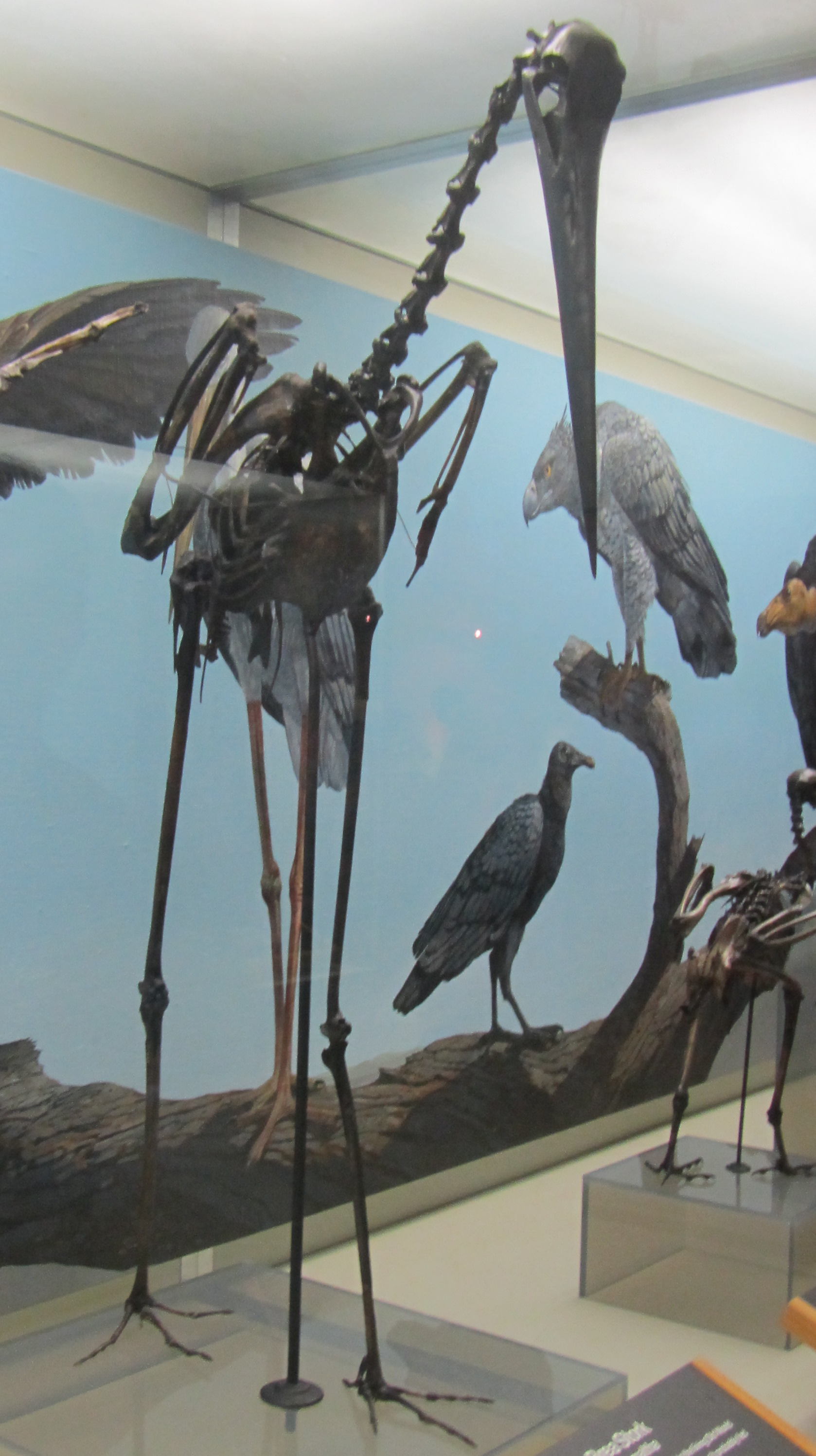
  - Mounted fossilized skeleton of the Pliocene-Pleistocene Ciconia maltha, also known as the asphalt stork or La Brea stork
    †Ciconia maltha
- Cidaris
- Cinctura
  - †Cinctura hunteria
  - †Cinctura lilium
- Circulus
- Circus
  - †Circus cyaneus – or unidentified comparable form
- Cirsotrema
- Cistothorus
  - †Cistothorus platensis
- Cladocora
- Clangula
  - †Clangula hyemalis
- Clathrodrillia
- Clathrus
- Clava
- Clavatula
- Clavus
- Clementia
- Closia
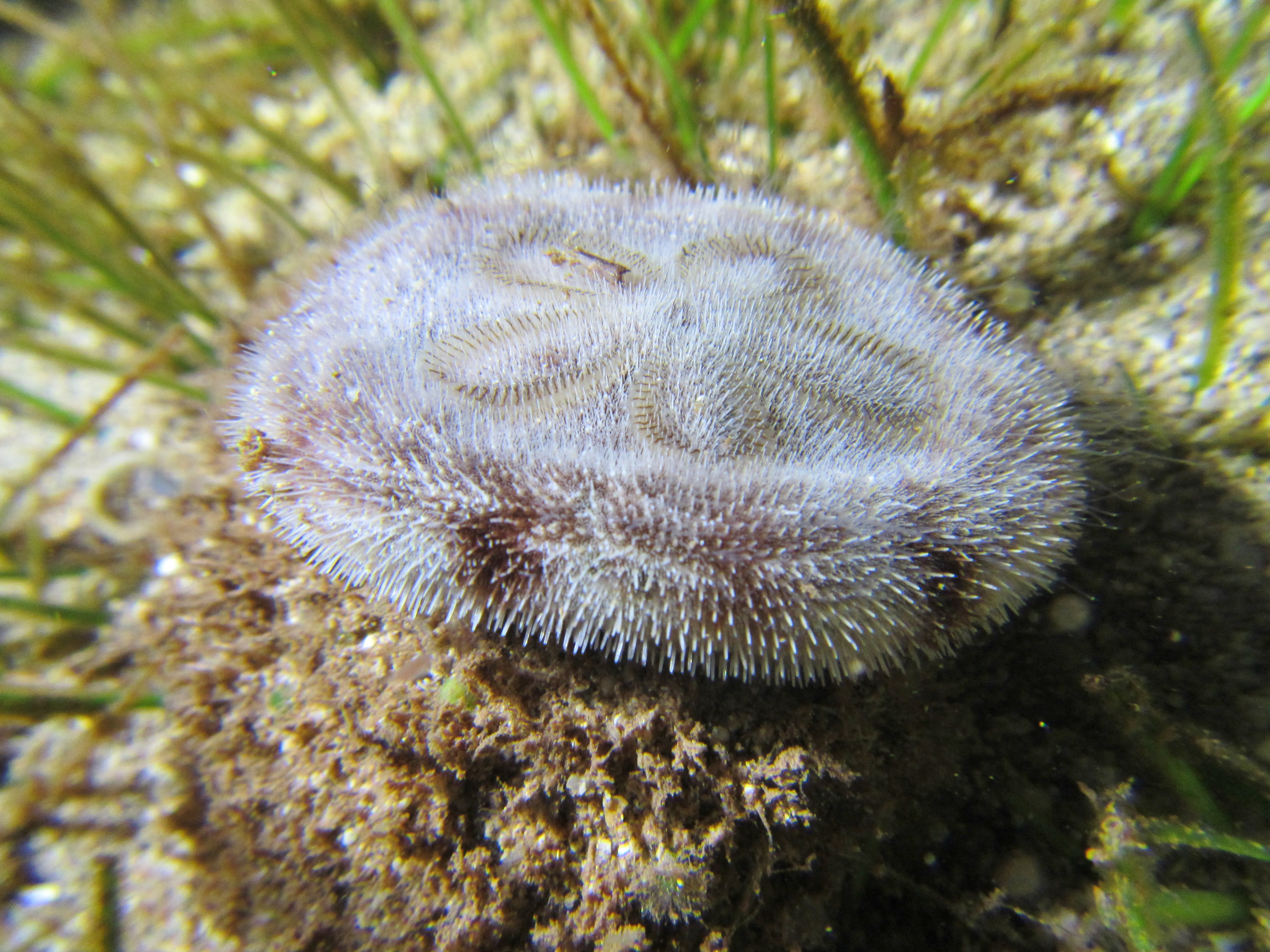
- A living Clypeaster, or sea biscuit
  Clypeaster
- Cnemidophorus
  - †Cnemidophorus sexlineatus
- Coccyzus
  - †Coccyzus americanus
- Cochlespira
- Cochliolepis
- Codakia
  - †Codakia orbicularis
- Colaptes
  - †Colaptes auratus
- Colinus
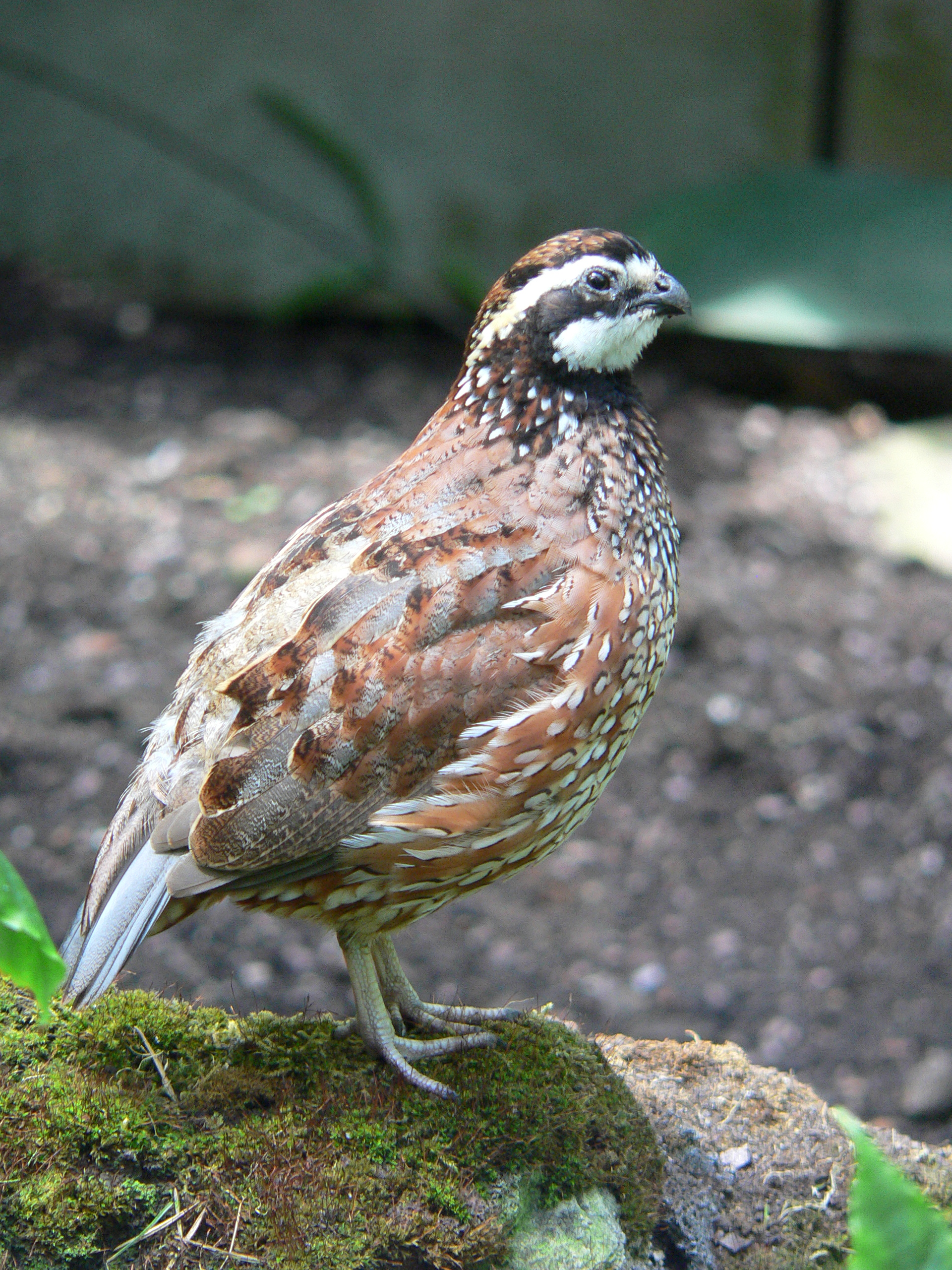
  - A living Colinus virginianus, or northern bobwhite
    †Colinus virginianus
- Colpophyllia
  - †Colpophyllia natans
- Coluber
  - †Coluber constrictor
- Columba
  - †Columba fasciata
- Columbella
  - †Columbella mercatoria
  - †Columbella rusticoides
- Columbellopsis
  - †Columbellopsis nycteis – or unidentified comparable form
- Compsodrillia
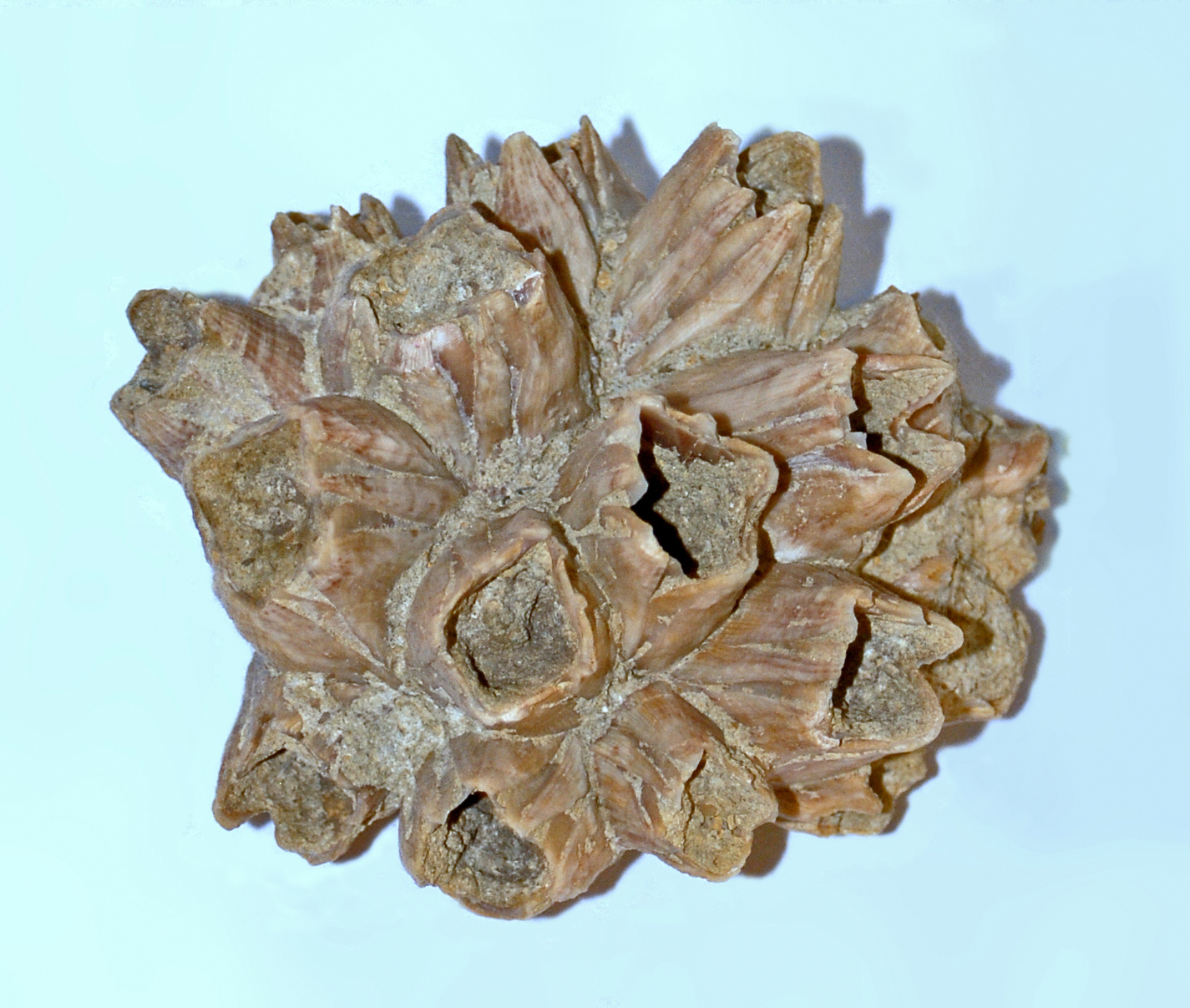
- Fossil of the Miocene-Pleistocene barnacle Concavus
  Concavus
- †Concholepas
- Conepatus
  - †Conepatus leuconotus
- Conomitra
- †Conorbis
- Conus
  - †Conus anabathrum
  - †Conus daucus
  - †Conus delessertii
  - †Conus eversoni – or unidentified comparable form
  - †Conus jaspideus – type locality for species
  - †Conus miamiensis
  - †Conus patglicksteinae
  - †Conus patricius
  - †Conus sennottorum
  - †Conus spurius
- Coragyps
  - †Coragyps atratus
  - †Coragyps occidentalis
- Coralliophila
- Corbula
- †Cormocyon
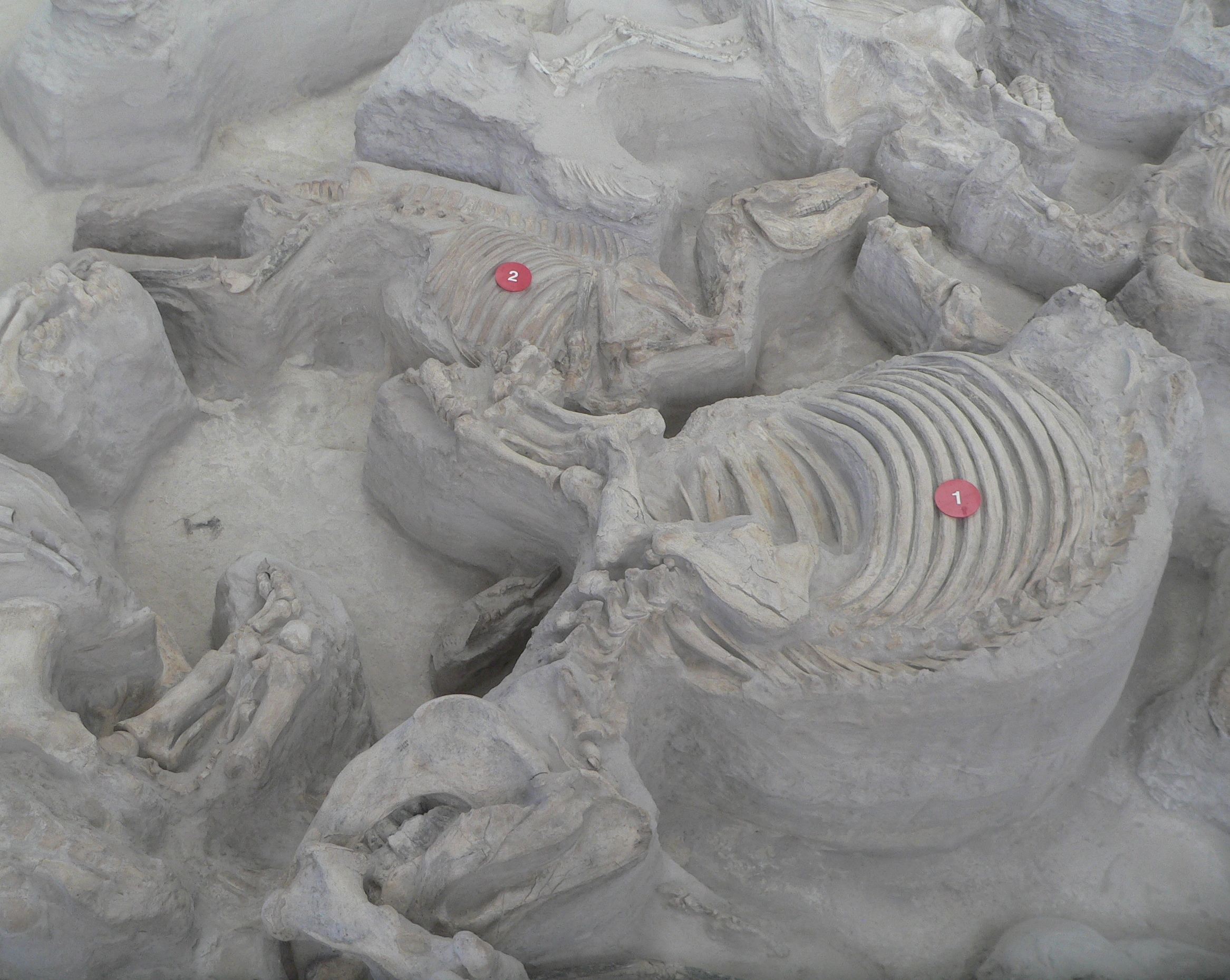
- Fossilized skeleton preserved in situ (upper left, 2) of the Miocene-Pliocene horse Cormohipparion
  †Cormohipparion
- Corvus
  - †Corvus brachyrhynchos
  - †Corvus ossifragus
- †Corylus
- Coturnicops
  - †Coturnicops noveboracensis
  - †Crassinella lunulata
- Crassispira
- Crassostrea
  - Crassostrea virginica
- †Cremaster – type locality for genus
- †Cremaster
- Crenella
- Crepidula
  - †Crepidula convexa
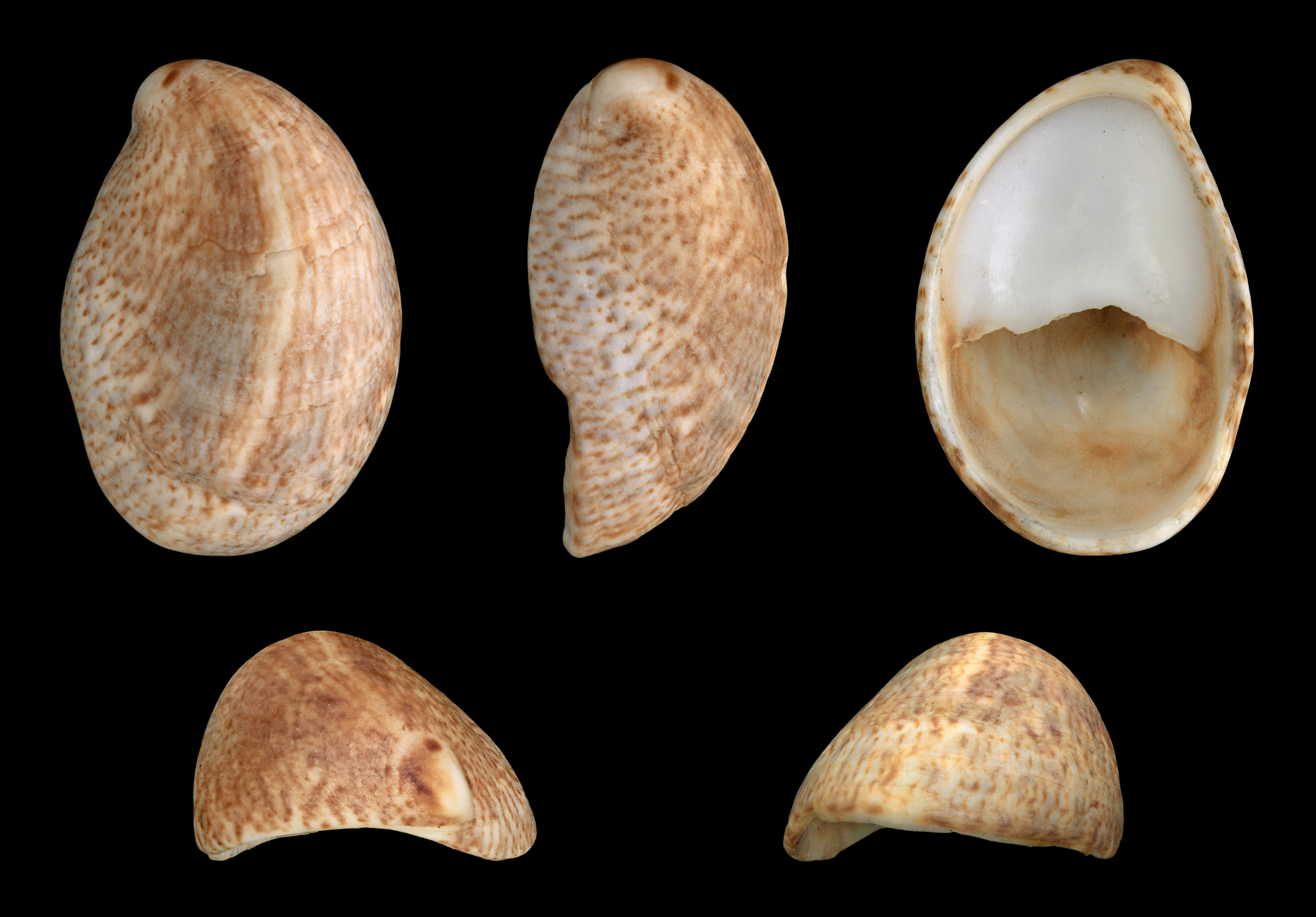
  - Shell in multiple views of a Crepidula fornicata, or common slipper shell sea snail
    ** Crepidula fornicata
  - †Crepidula maculosa
  - †Crepidula plana
- Crepipatella
- †Crommium
- Crotalus
  - †Crotalus adamanteus
  - †Crotalus giganteus
- Crucibulum
  - †Crucibulum auricula
  - †Crucibulum spinosum
  - †Crucibulum striatum
- Cryptotis
  - †Cryptotis parva
  - †Ctena orbiculata
- Cumingia
- Cupuladria
- Cupularia
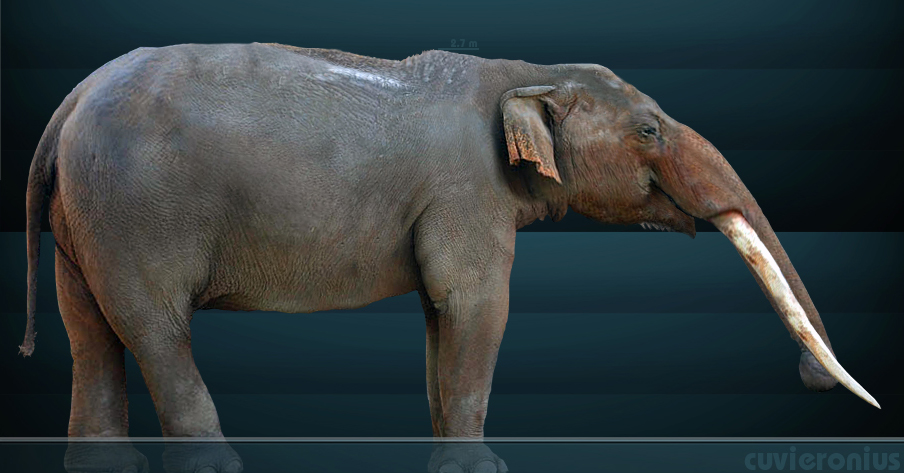
- Life restoration of the Pliocene-Holocene elephant relative Cuvieronius
  †Cuvieronius
  - †Cuvieronius tropicus
- Cyanocitta
  - †Cyanocitta cristata
- Cyclocardia
- Cygnus
  - †Cygnus buccinator
  - †Cygnus columbianus
- Cylichna
- †Cymakra
  - †Cymakra poncei
- Cymatium
- Cymatosyrinx
- Cymbovula
  - †Cymbovula acicularis
- Cymodocea
- †Cynarctoides
  - †Cynarctoides lemur
- †Cynelos
- Cynoscion
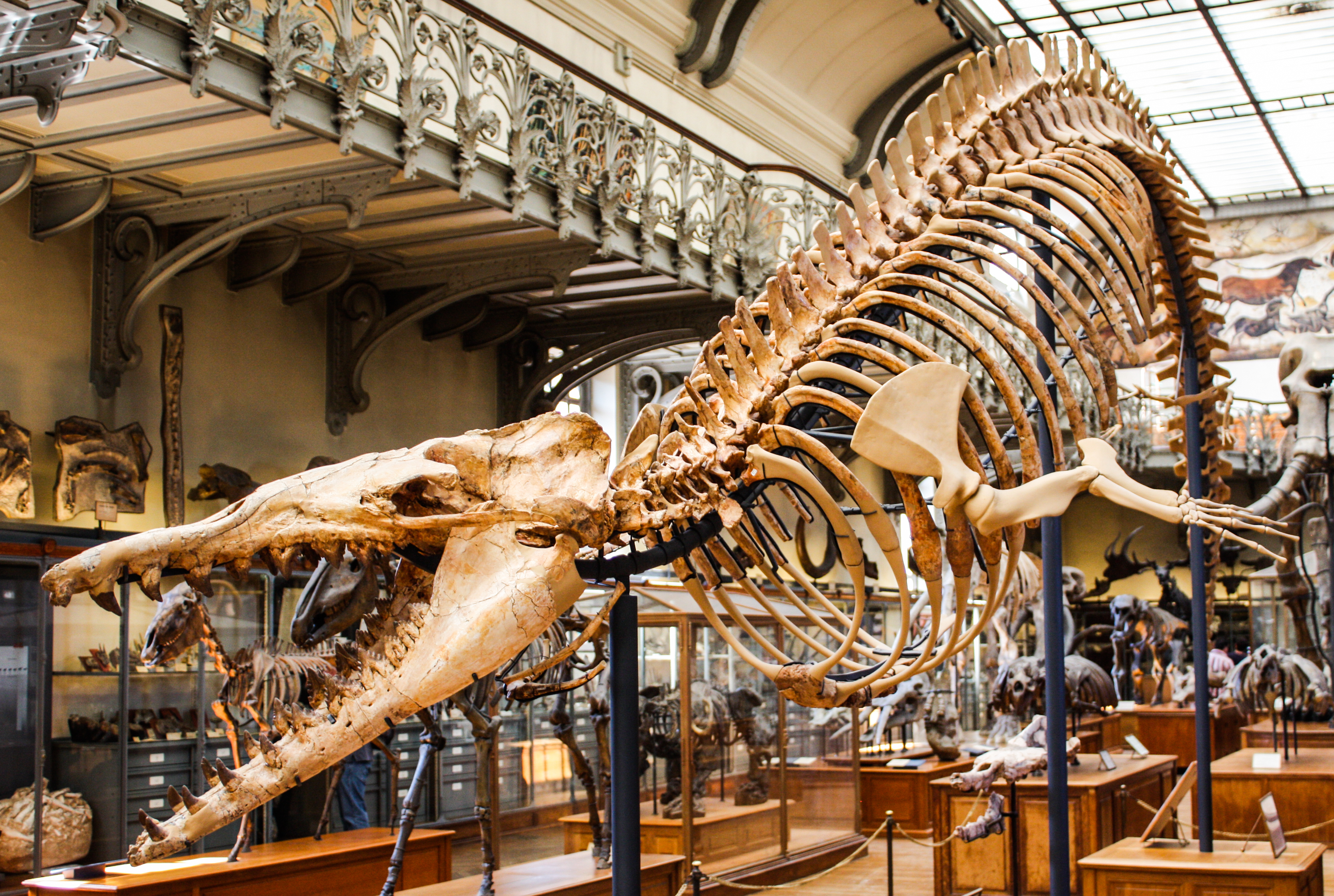
- Mounted fossilized skeleton of the Eocene whale Cynthiacetus
  †Cynthiacetus
- Cyphoma
  - †Cyphoma gibbosum
  - †Cyphoma intermedium
- Cypraea
- Cypraecassis
- Cypraedia
  - †Cyrenoida floridana
  - †Cyrtopleura costata
- Cythara
  - †Cythara anthera
- Daedalochila
  - †Daedalochila uvulifera
- Daphnella
  - †Daphnella elata
- †Daphoenodon
- †Daphoenus – tentative report
- Dasyatis
- Dasypus
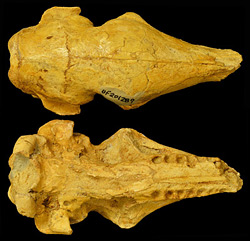
  - Fossilized cranium seen from above and below of the Pleistocene Dasypus bellus, or beautiful armadillo
    †Dasypus bellus – type locality for species
- Dauciconus
- Deirochelys
  - †Deirochelys reticularia
- Dendraster
- Dendrocopos
- Dendrocygna
- †Dendrogyra
  - †Dendrogyra cylindrus
- Dendropoma
  - †Dendropoma irregulare
- Dentalium
- Dentimargo
  - †Dentimargo aureocinctus
  - †Dentimargo eburneolus
- Dermomurex
  - †Dermomurex antecessor
  - †Dermomurex elizabethae
- †Desmatippus
- †Desmocyon
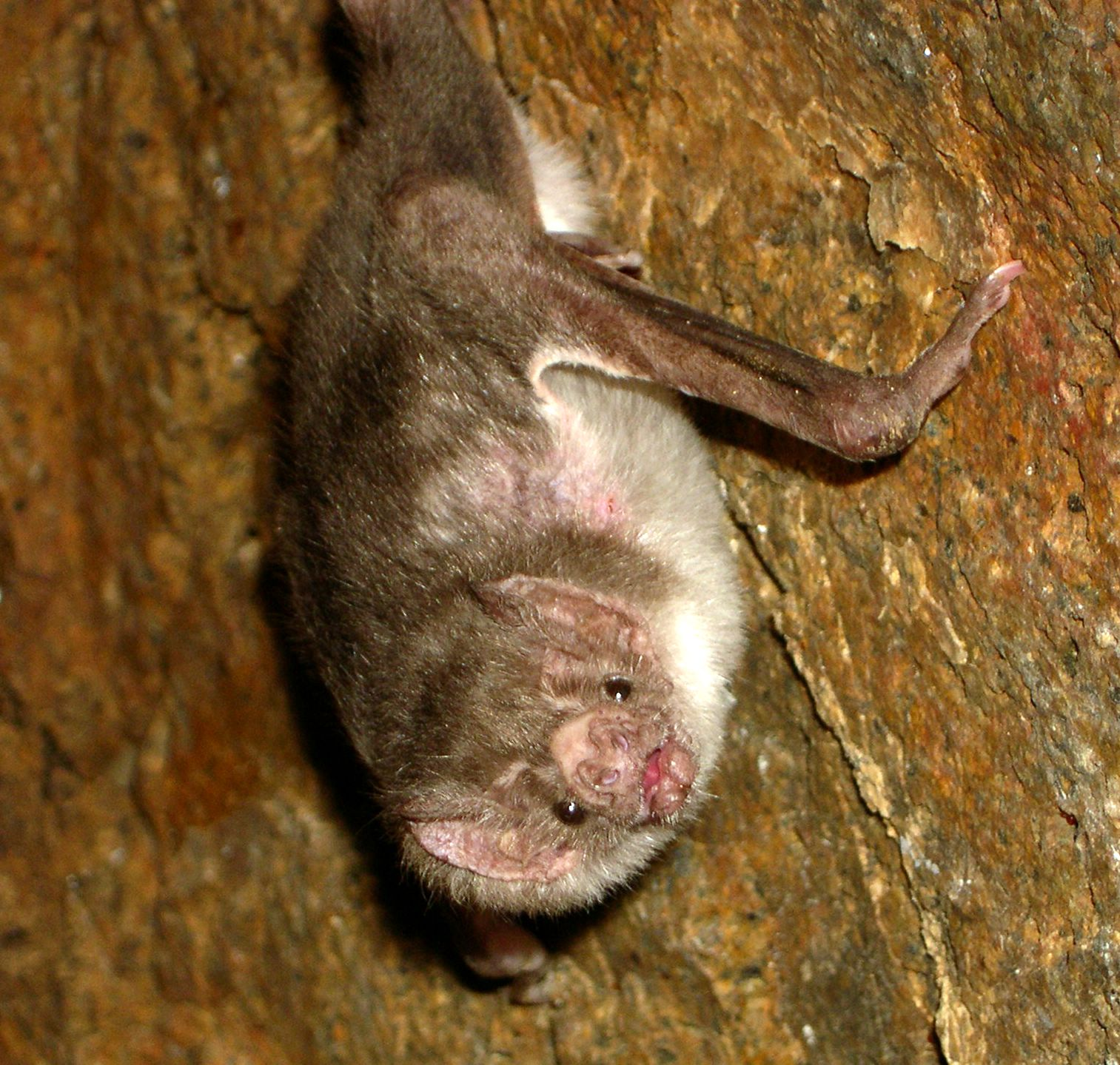
- A living Desmodus, or vampire bat
  Desmodus
  - †Desmodus stocki
- Diadophis
  - †Diadophis punctatus
- Diastoma
- Dicathais
- †Diceratherium – or unidentified comparable form
- Dichocoenia
  - †Dichocoenia stokesi
- Didelphis
  - †Didelphis marsupialis
  - †Didelphis virginiana
- †Didianema
  - †Didianema pauli
- Dinocardium
  - †Dinocardium robustum
- †Dinohippus
- †Dinohyus
- Diodon
- Diodora
  - †Diodora cayenensis
  - †Diodora meta
  - †Diodora sayi
  - †Diplodonta punctata
  - †Diplodonta semiaspera
- Diploria
  - †Diploria labyrinthiformis
- †Dipoides
- Discinisca
- †Discohelix
- Discorbis
- Distorsio
  - †Distorsio mcgintyi – type locality for species
  - †Divaricella dentata
- Dolabella
- †Dolicholatirus
- Donax
  - Donax fossor
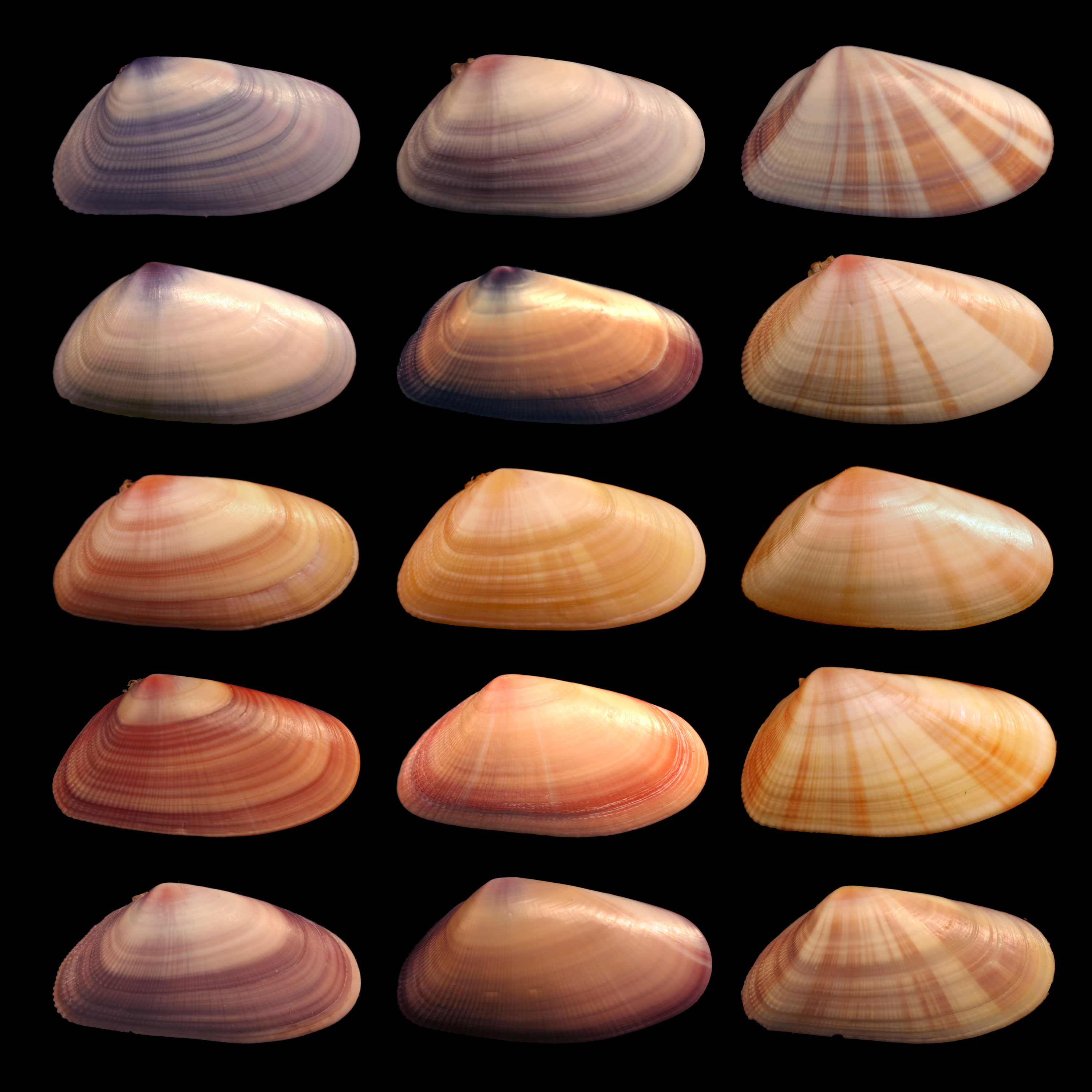
  - Shells of Donax variabilis, or coquina
    Donax variabilis
- †Dorypaltus – type locality for genus
  - †Dorypaltus prosphatus – type locality for species
- Dosinia
  - Dosinia discus
- Drymarchon
  - †Drymarchon corais
- Dryocopus
- Dumetella
  - †Dumetella carolinensis
- Echinocardium
- Echinometra
  - †Echinometra lucunter
- †Ecphora
- †Ectopistes
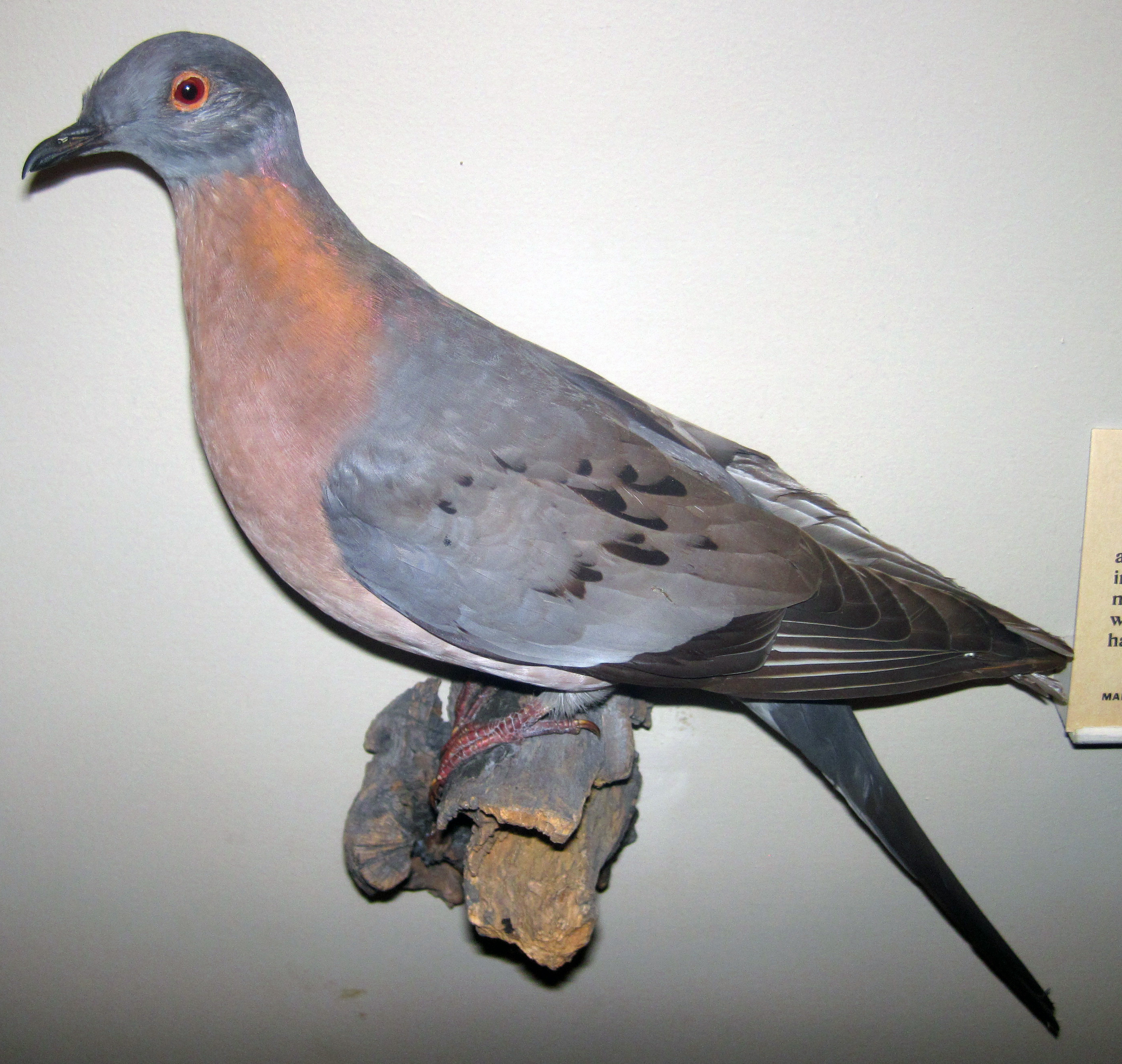
  - Taxidermied male Ectopistes migratorius, or passenger pigeon
    †Ectopistes migratorius
- Egretta
  - †Egretta thula
  - †Egretta tricolor – or unidentified comparable form
- Elaphe
  - †Elaphe guttata
  - †Elaphe obsoleta
- Eleutherodactylus – or unidentified comparable form
- †Elliptoideus
- Elphidium
- Emarginula
- Enaeta
- Engina
- †Engoniophos
  - †Enhydritherium terraenovae – type locality for species
- †Enhydrocyon
- Ensis
  - Ensis directus
  - Ensis minor
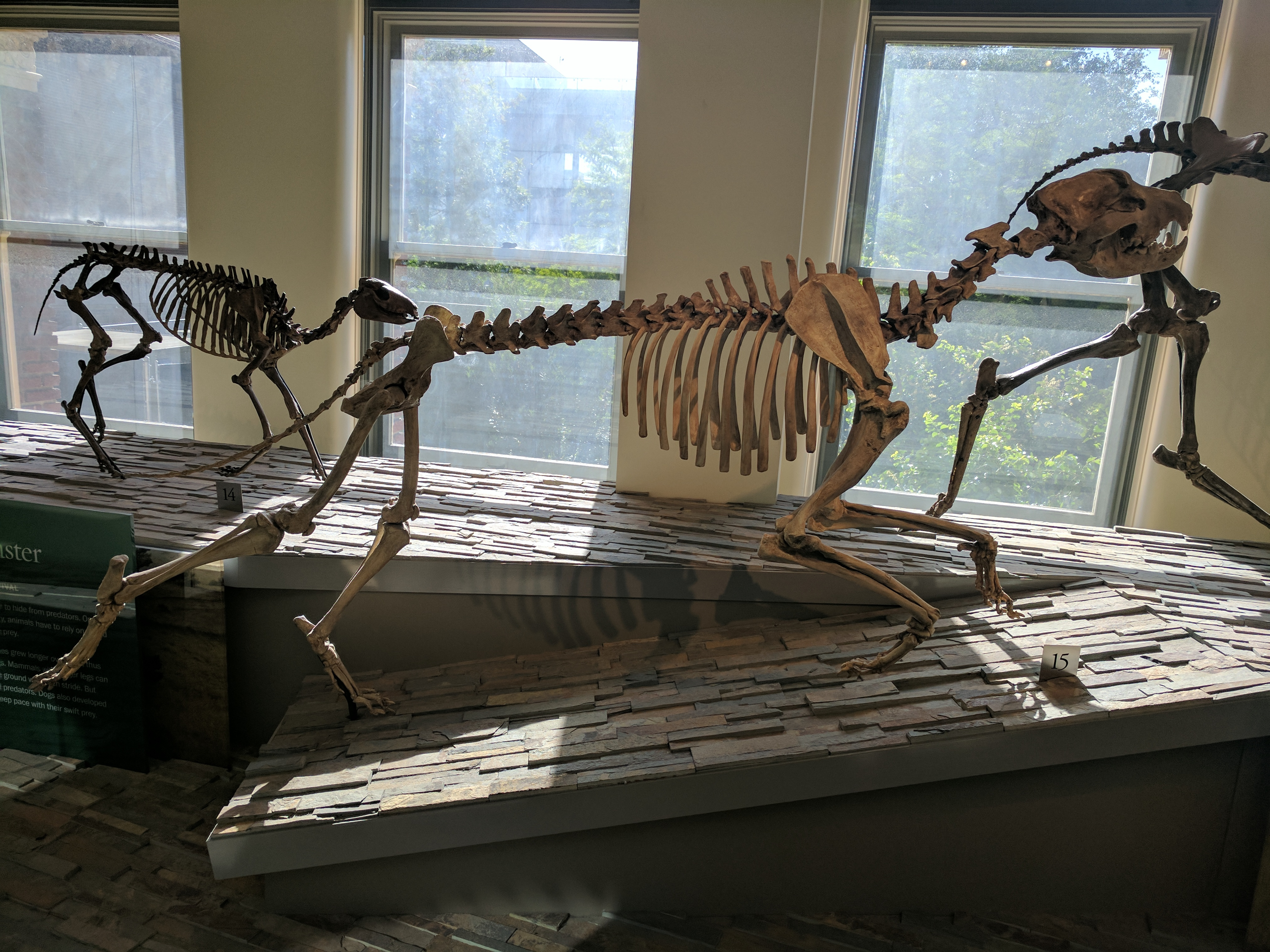
- Mounted fossilized skeleton of the Miocene bone-crushing dog Epicyon
  †Epicyon
  - †Epicyon haydeni
- Epitonium
  - †Epitonium humphreysii
  - †Epitonium novangliae
- Eptesicus
  - †Eptesicus fuscus
- Equetus
- Equus
  - †Equus fraternus
  - †Equus giganteus
- Eratoidea
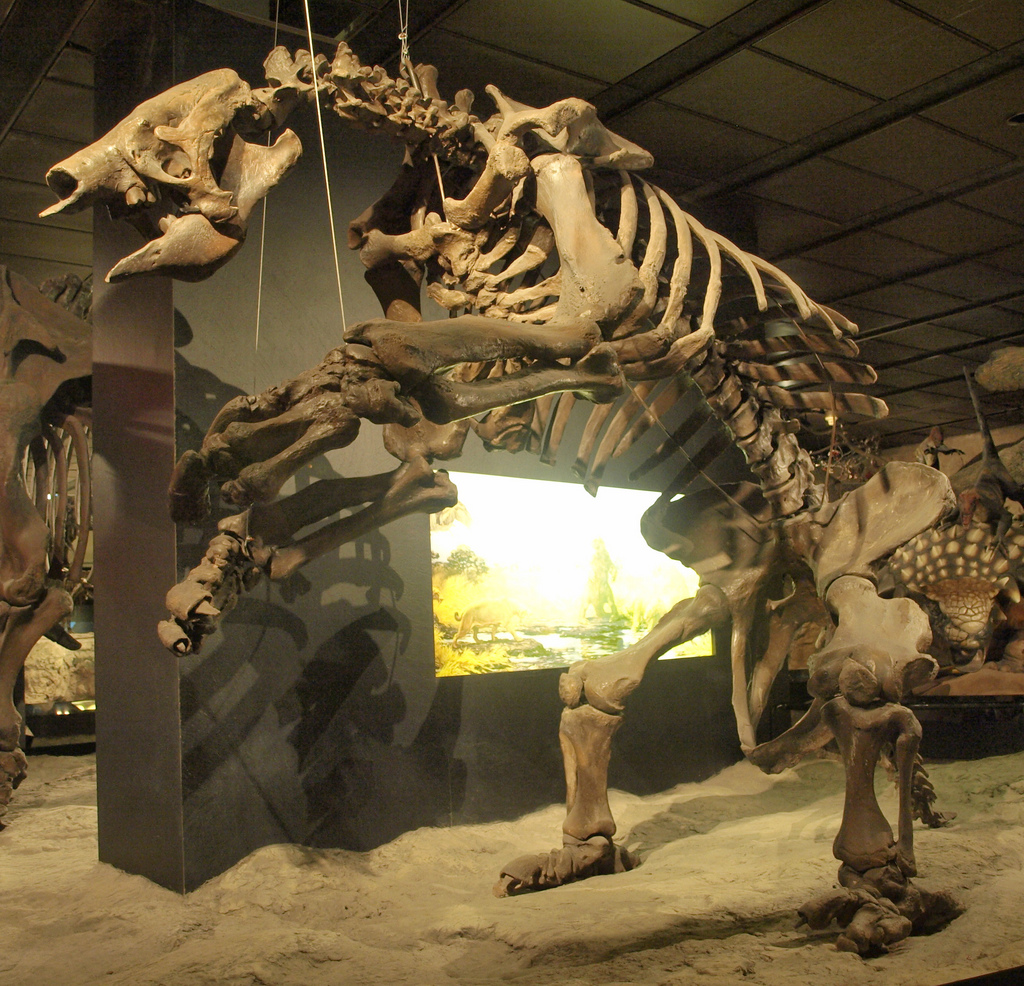
- Mounted fossilized skeleton of the Pliocene-Pleistocene ground sloth Eremotherium
  †Eremotherium
  - †Eremotherium laurillardi
- Erethizon
  - †Erethizon dorsatum
- Eretmochelys
- †Ereunetes
- Erolia
- Ervilia
- Erycina – tentative report
- Erycina
- Eubalaena
- Eucidaris
  - †Eucidaris tribuloides
  - †Eucrassatella speciosa
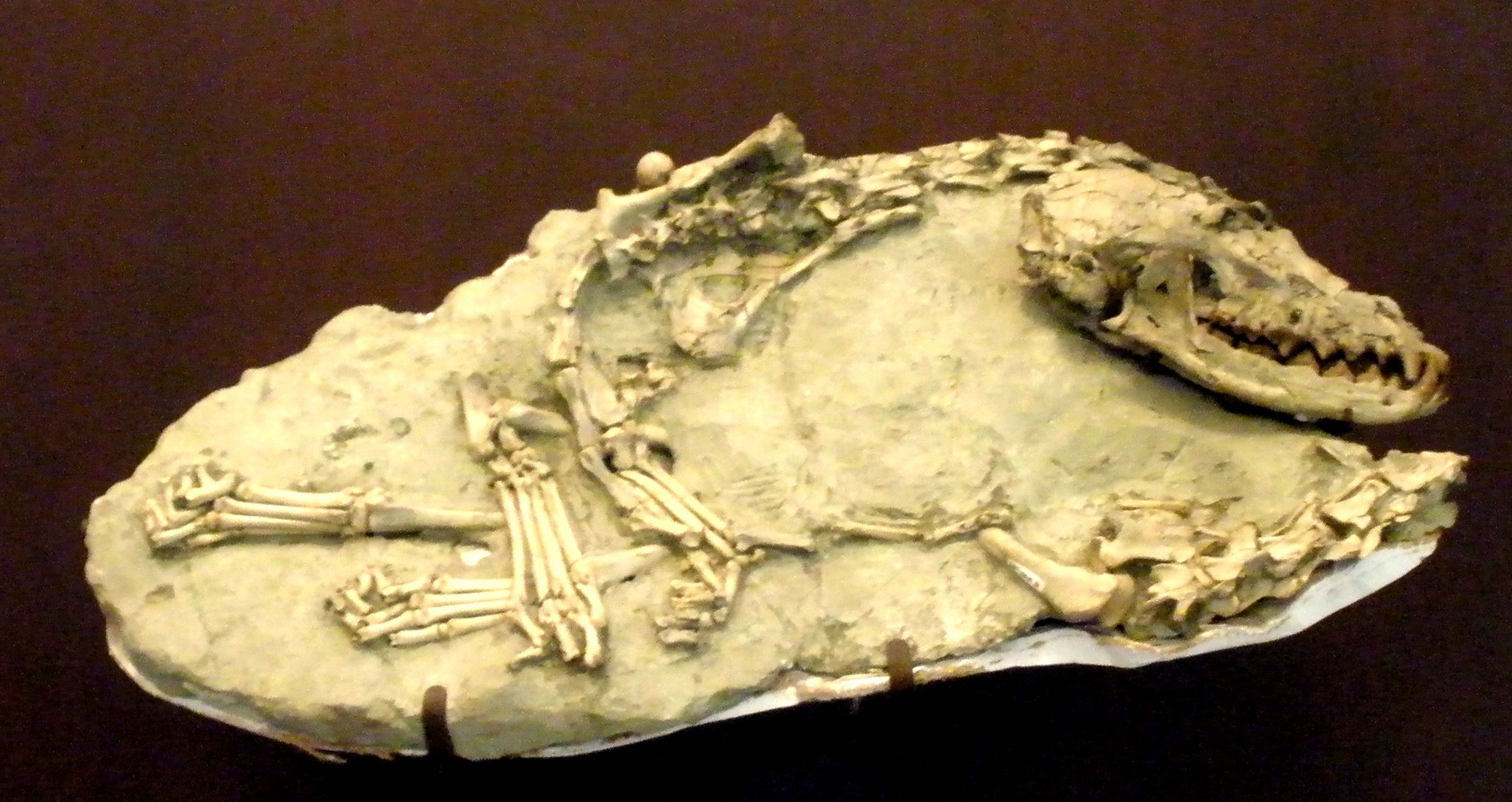
- Fossilized skeleton of the Miocene-Pliocene coyote-like canine Eucyon
  †Eucyon
  - †Eucyon davisi
- Eudocimus
  - †Eudocimus albus
- †Eudolium
- Eugeniconus
- Euglandina
  - †Euglandina rosea
- Eulima
  - †Eulima bifasciata
- Eulithidium
  - †Eulithidium thalassicola
- Eumeces
  - †Eumeces fasciatus
  - †Eumeces inexpectatus
- Eumops – type locality for genus
  - †Eumops glaucinus – type locality for species
- †Euoplocyon
- Euphagus
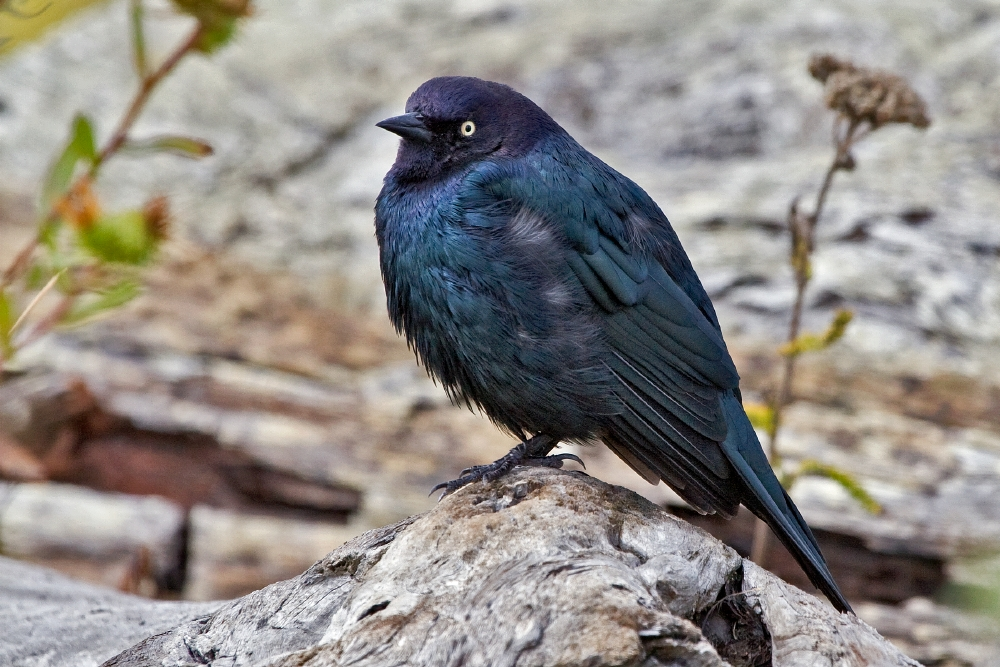
  - A living Euphagus cyanocephalus, or Brewer's blackbird
    †Euphagus cyanocephalus
- Eupleura
  - †Eupleura caudata
  - †Eupleura sulcidentata
  - †Eupleura tampaensis
- Eusmilia
  - †Eusmilia fastigiata
- Euspira
- Euvola
  - †Euvola raveneli
  - †Euvola ziczac
- Fabella
- Falco
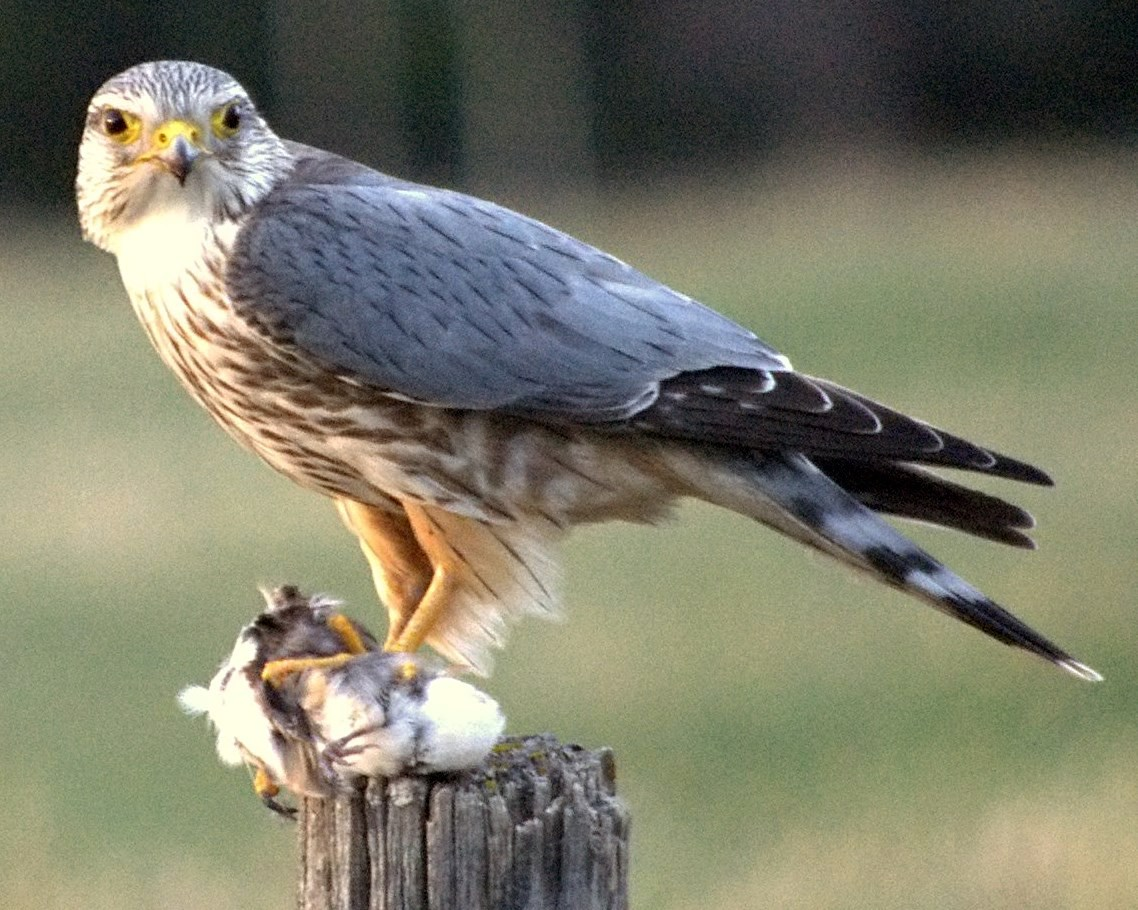
  - A living Falco columbarius, or merlin
    †Falco columbarius
  - †Falco peregrinus
  - †Falco sparverius
- Farancia
  - †Farancia abacura
- Fasciolaria
  - Fasciolaria tulipa
- Favartia
  - †Favartia cellulosa
- Favia
  - Favia fragum
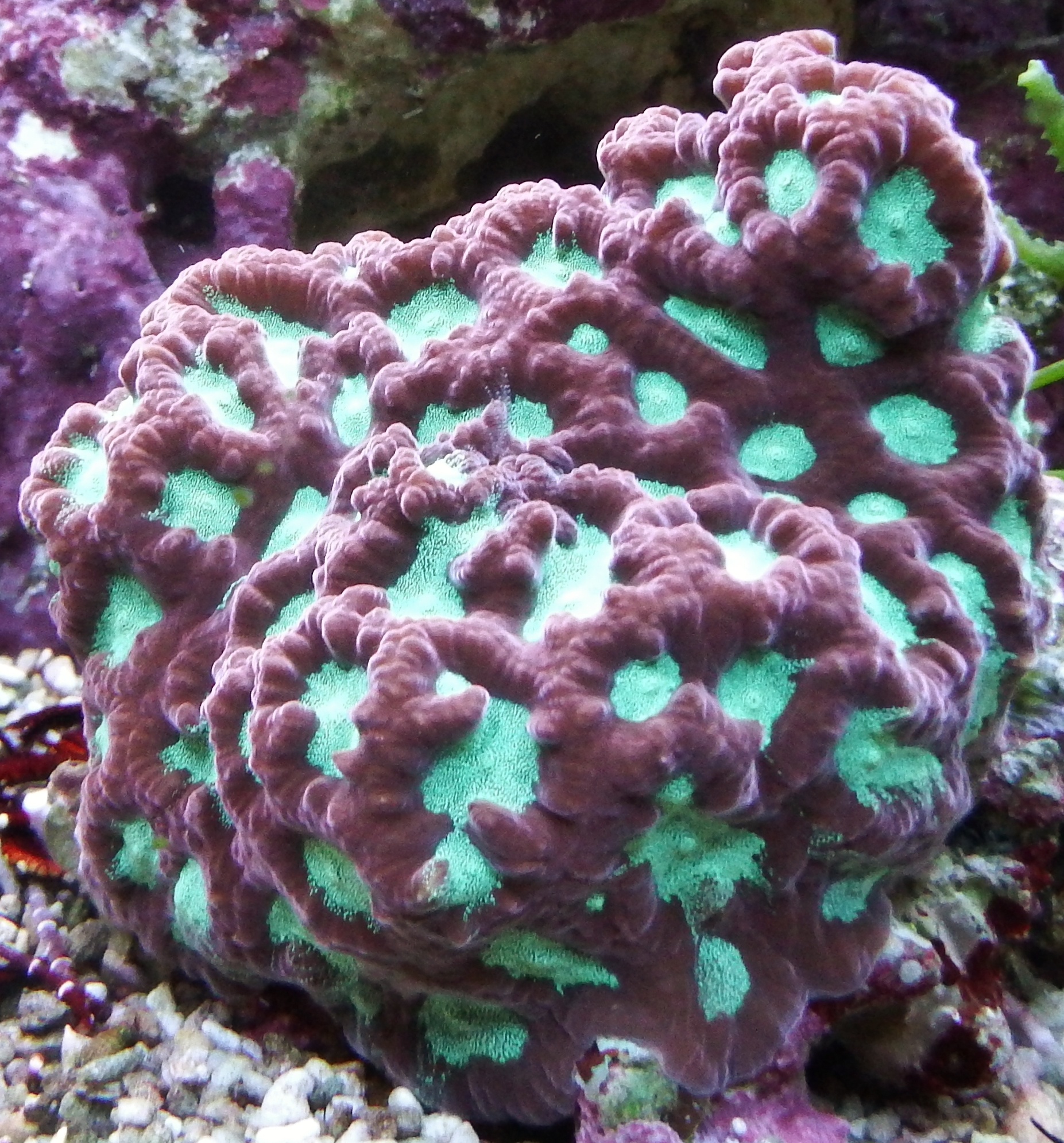
- Living Favites stony coral
  Favites
- Felis
- Fenimorea
  - †Fenimorea fucata
  - †Fenimorea moseri
  - †Fenimorea pagodula
- Ferrissia
- Ficus
  - Ficus communis
- Fimbria
- Finella
  - †Finella adamsi
  - †Finella dubia
- Fissurella
- Flabellum
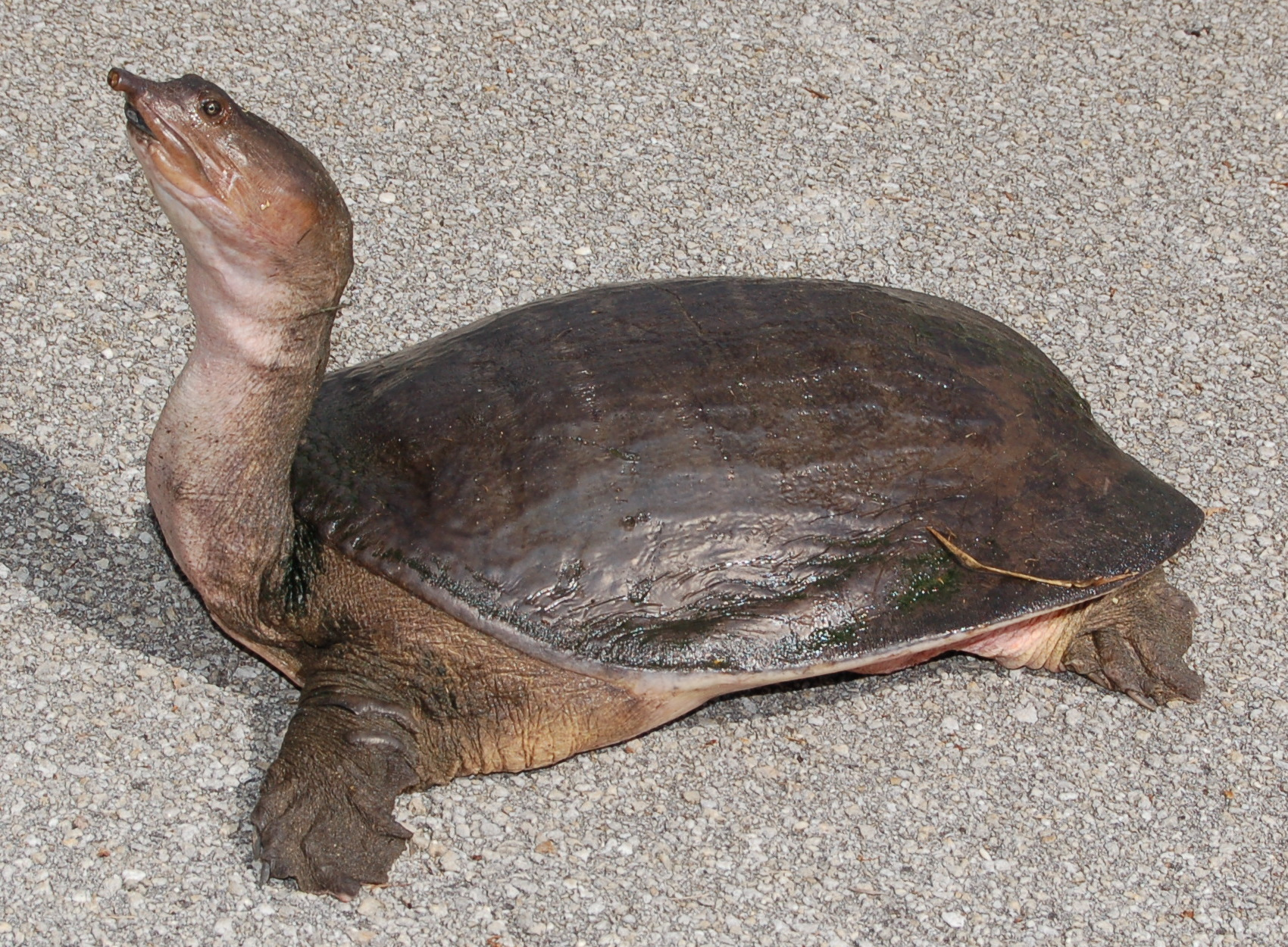
- A living Apalone ferox, or Florida softshell turtle
  †Florida
  - †Florida caerulea
- †Floridaceras
- †Floridachoerus
- †Floridatragulus
- Fontigens – report made of unidentified related form or using admittedly obsolete nomenclature
- Fossaria
  - †Fossaria cubensis
- Fossarus
- Fragum
- Fulgurofusus
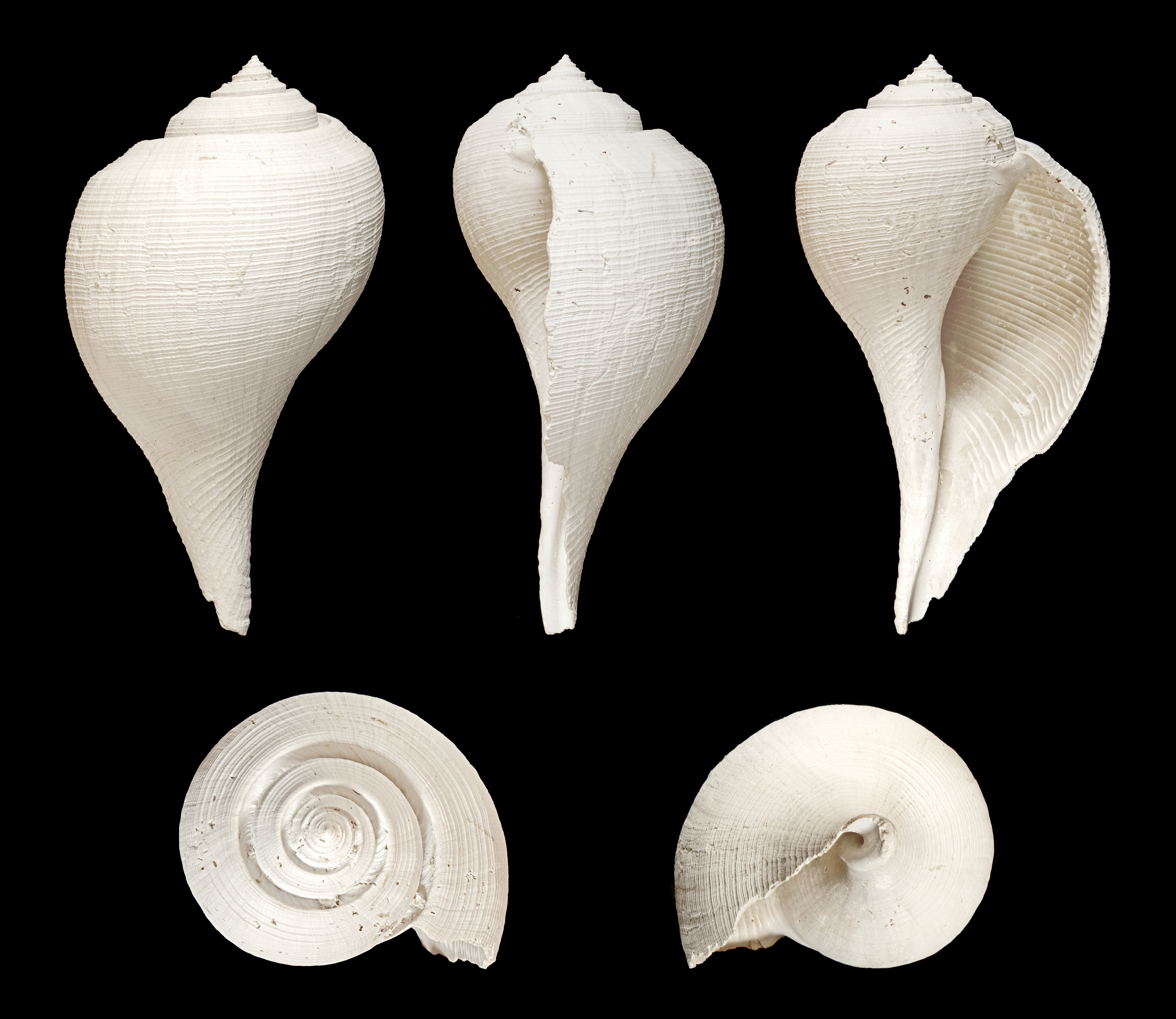
- Shell in multiple views of a Fulguropsis whelk
  Fulguropsis
  - †Fulguropsis feldmanni
- †Fulica
  - †Fulica americana
- †Fundulus
- Fusinus
- Fusiturricula
- Gadila
- †Galaxea
- Galeocerdo
  - †Galeocerdo aduncus
  - †Galeocerdo contortus
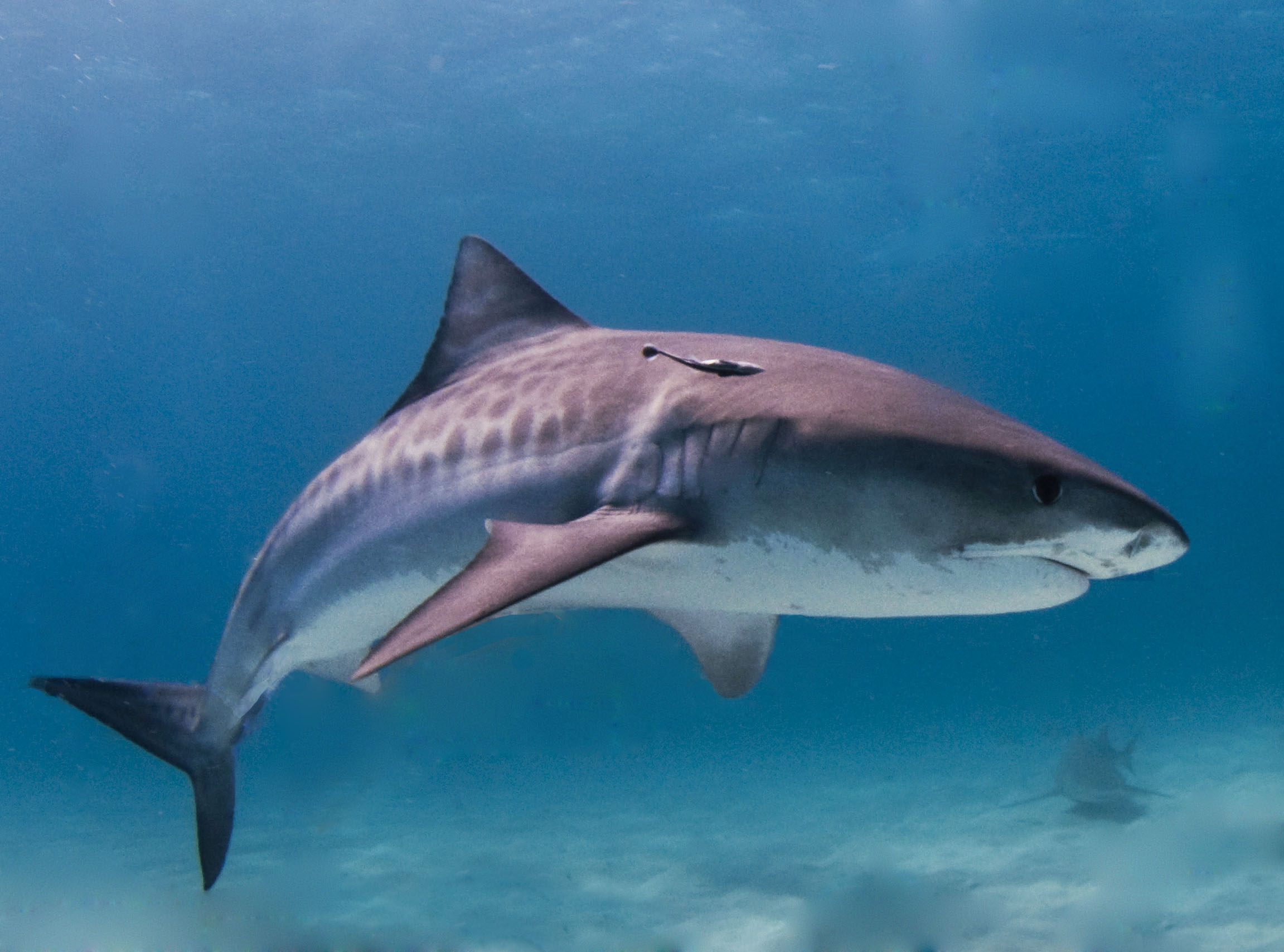
  - A living Galeocerdo cuvier, or tiger shark
    †Galeocerdo cuvier
- Gallinago
  - †Gallinago gallinago
- Gallinula
  - †Gallinula brodkorbi – type locality for species
  - †Gallinula chloropus
- †Gambusia
  - †Gambusia affinis
- Gari
- Gastrochaena
- Gastrocopta
  - †Gastrocopta contracta
  - †Gastrocopta pentodon
- Gastrophryne
  - †Gastrophryne carolinensis
- Gavia
  - †Gavia immer
  - †Gavia pacifica
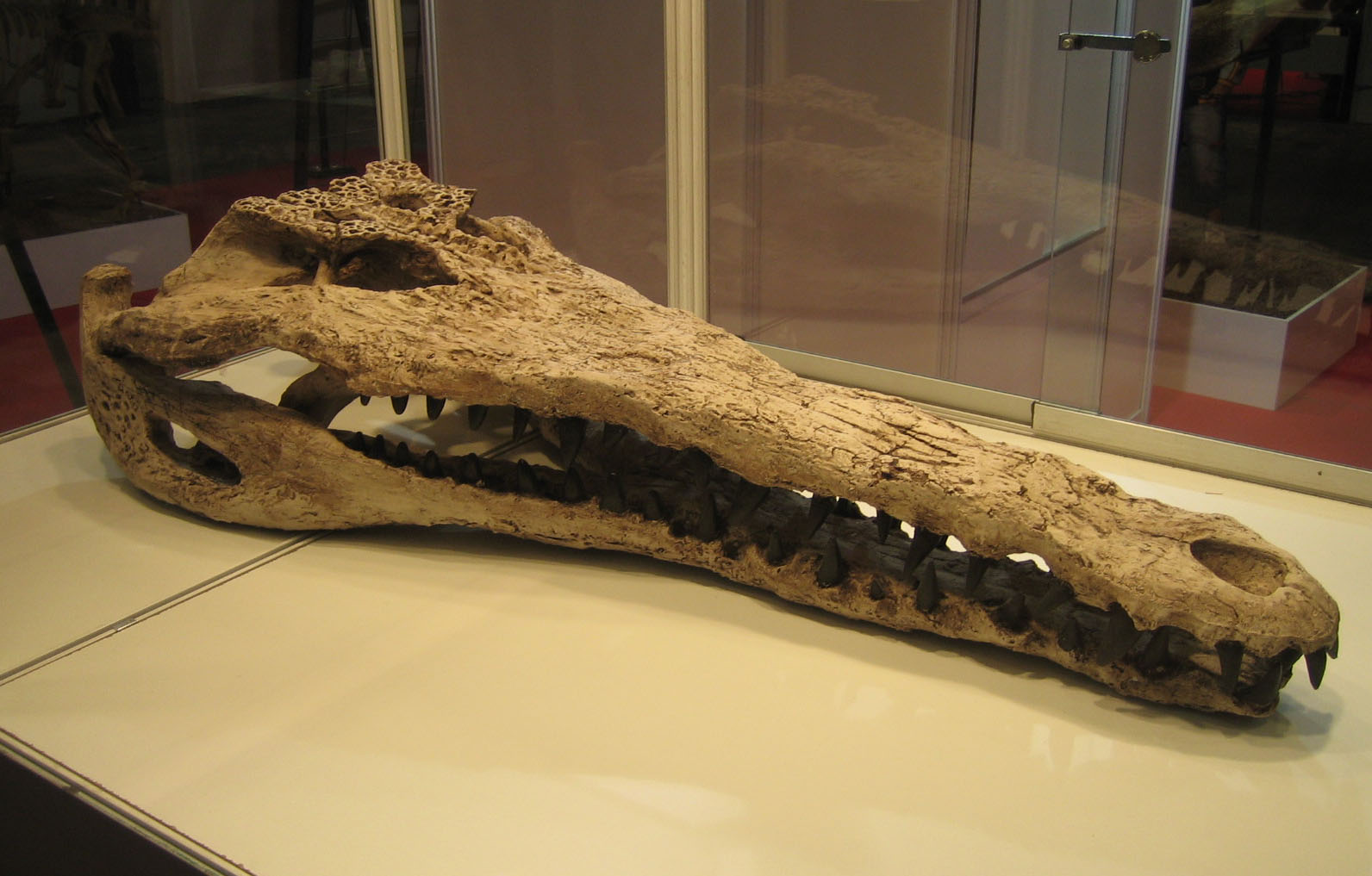
- Fossilized skull of the Miocene crocodile relative Gavialosuchus
  †Gavialosuchus – type locality for genus
  - †Gavialosuchus americanus
- Gegania
- Gemma
  - Gemma gemma
- Gemmula
- Gemophos
  - †Gemophos tinctus
- Genota
- †Gentilicamelus – or unidentified comparable form
- Geochelone
- Geomys
  - †Geomys pinetis
- †Geothlypis
  - †Geothlypis trichas
- Geranoaetus
- Gibberula
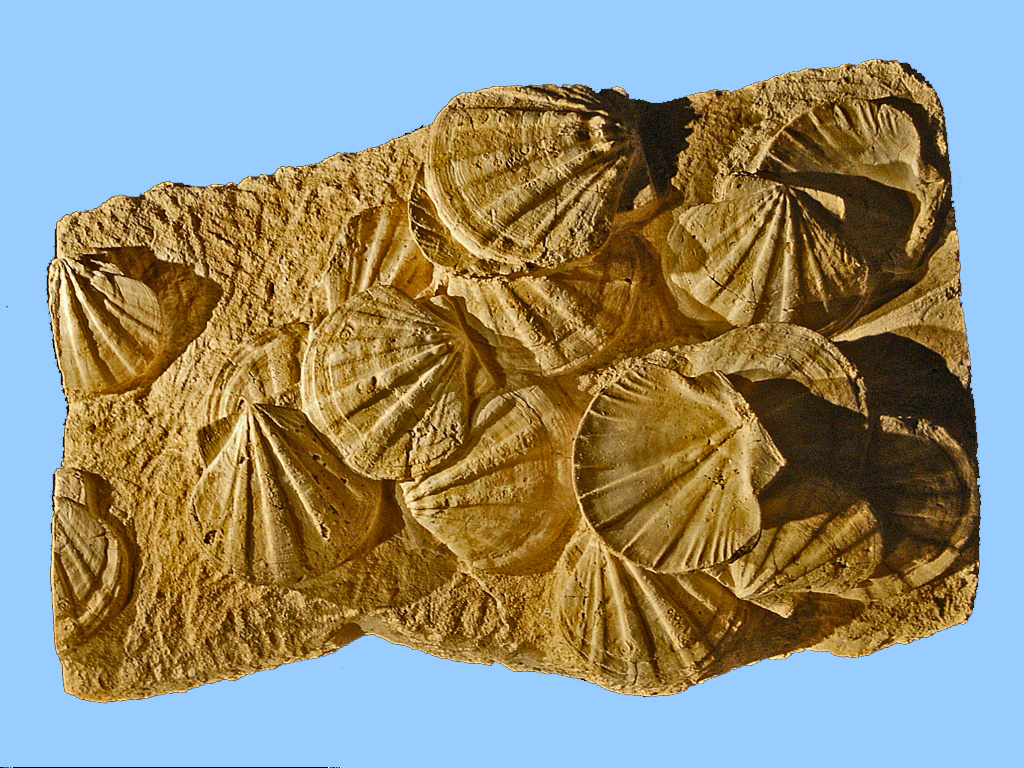
- Fossilized shells of the Oligocene-Pliocene scallop Gigantopecten
  †Gigantopecten
- †Gigantostrea
- Ginglymostoma
  - †Ginglymostoma cirratum
- Glans
- Glaucidium
- Glaucomys
- Globicephala
  - †Globicephala macrorhynchus – type locality for species
- Globigerina
- Globularia
- Globulina
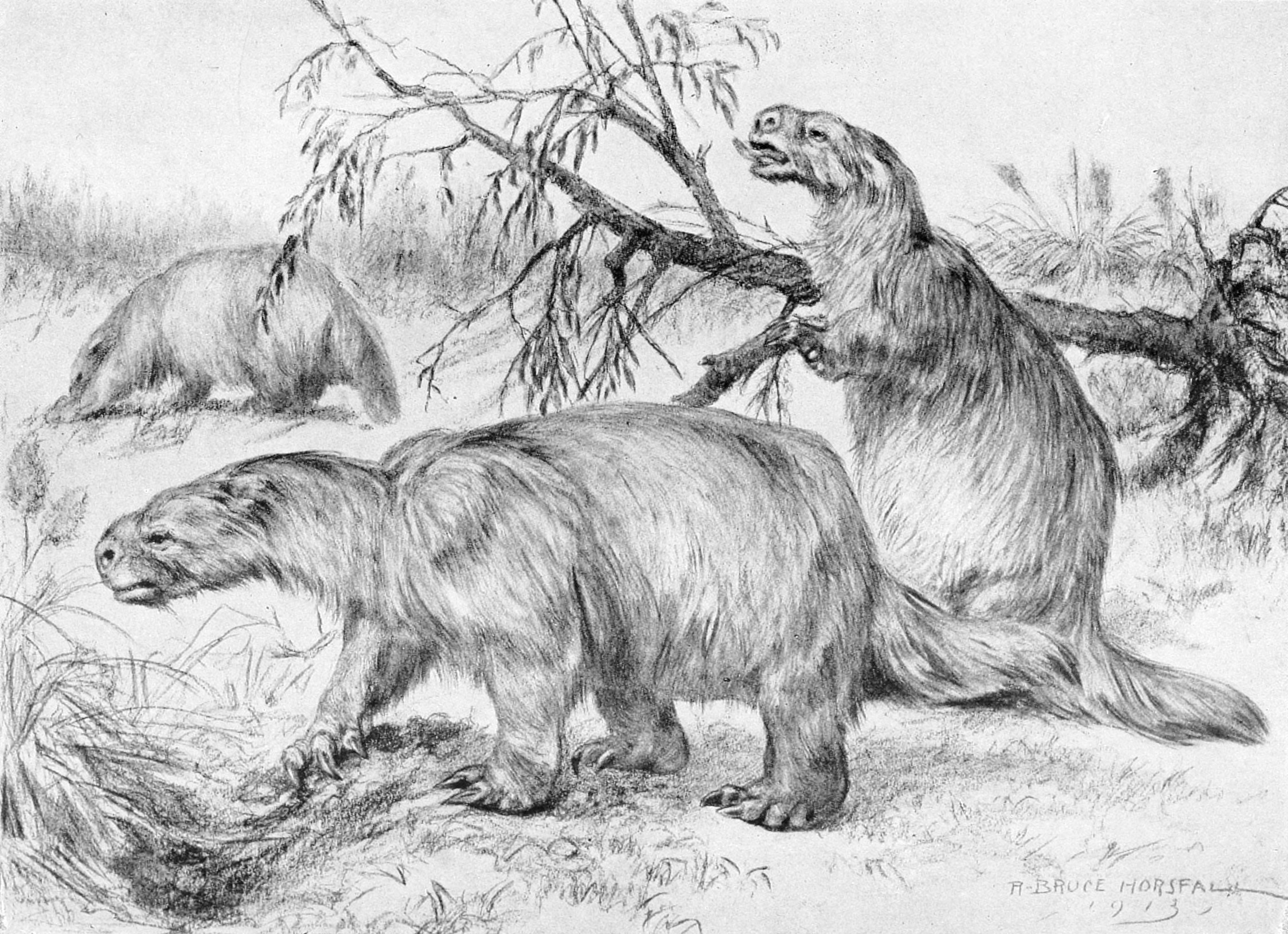
- Restoration of a herd of the Pliocene-Holocene ground sloth Glossotherium
  †Glossotherium
- Glycymeris
  - Glycymeris americana
  - †Glycymeris decussata
- Glyphostoma
- Glyphyalinia
- Glyptoactis
- †Glyptotherium
- †Gomphotherium
- †Goniodelphis – type locality for genus
- Goniopora
- Gopherus
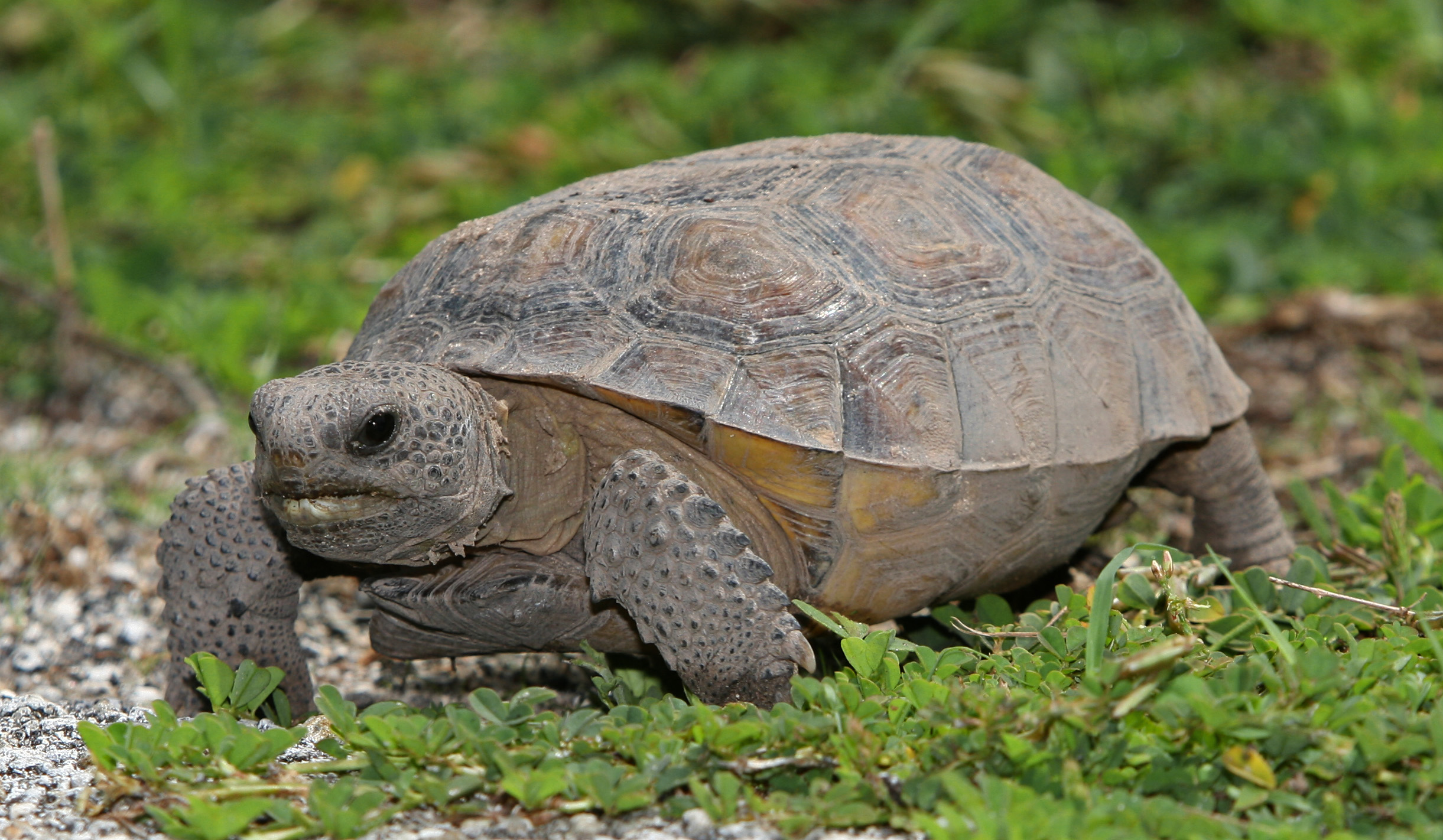
  - A living Gopherus polyphemus, or gopher tortoise
    †Gopherus polyphemus
- †Granoturris
  - †Granoturris padolina
- Granulina
- Graptemys
  - †Graptemys barbouri – or unidentified comparable form
- Gregariella
  - †Gregariella coralliophaga
- Grus
  - Grus americana
- †Guara
- Guttulina
- Gymnogyps
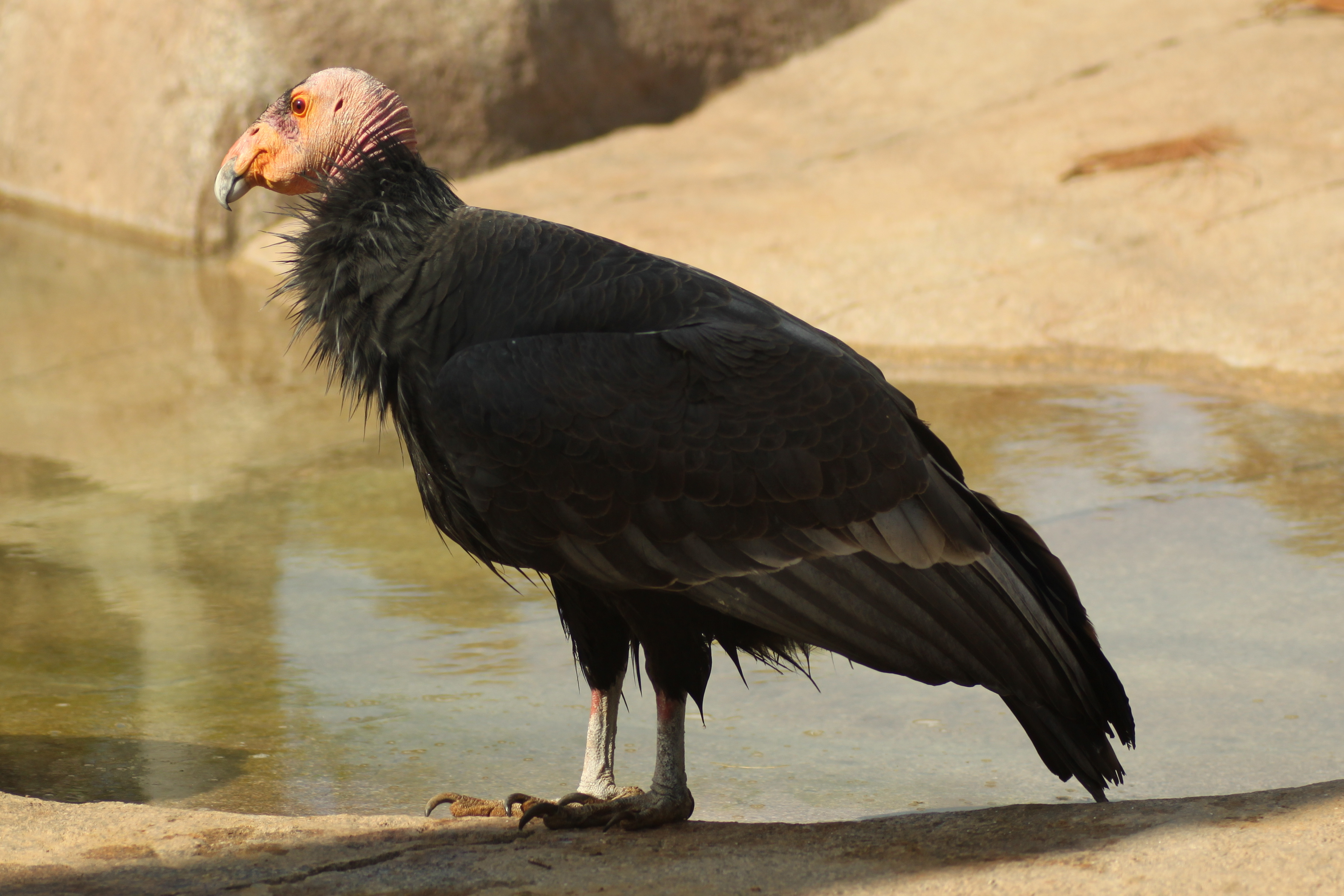
  - A living Gymnogyps californianus, or California condor
    †Gymnogyps californianus
- Gyraulus
  - †Gyraulus parvus
- †Hadrodelphis
- Haematopus – type locality for genus
  - †Haematopus palliatus – type locality for species
- Haemulon
- Haliaeetus
  - †Haliaeetus leucocephalus
- †Haliaetus
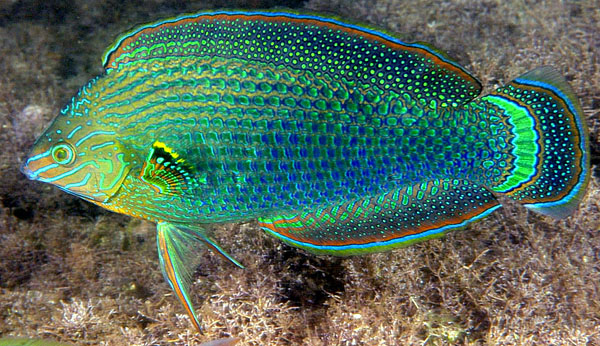
- A living Halichoeres wrasse
  †Halichoeres
- †Halimeda
- Halodule
- Haminoea
- Harengula
- Hastula
- Haustellum
- Hawaiia
- Heilprinia
- Heliaster
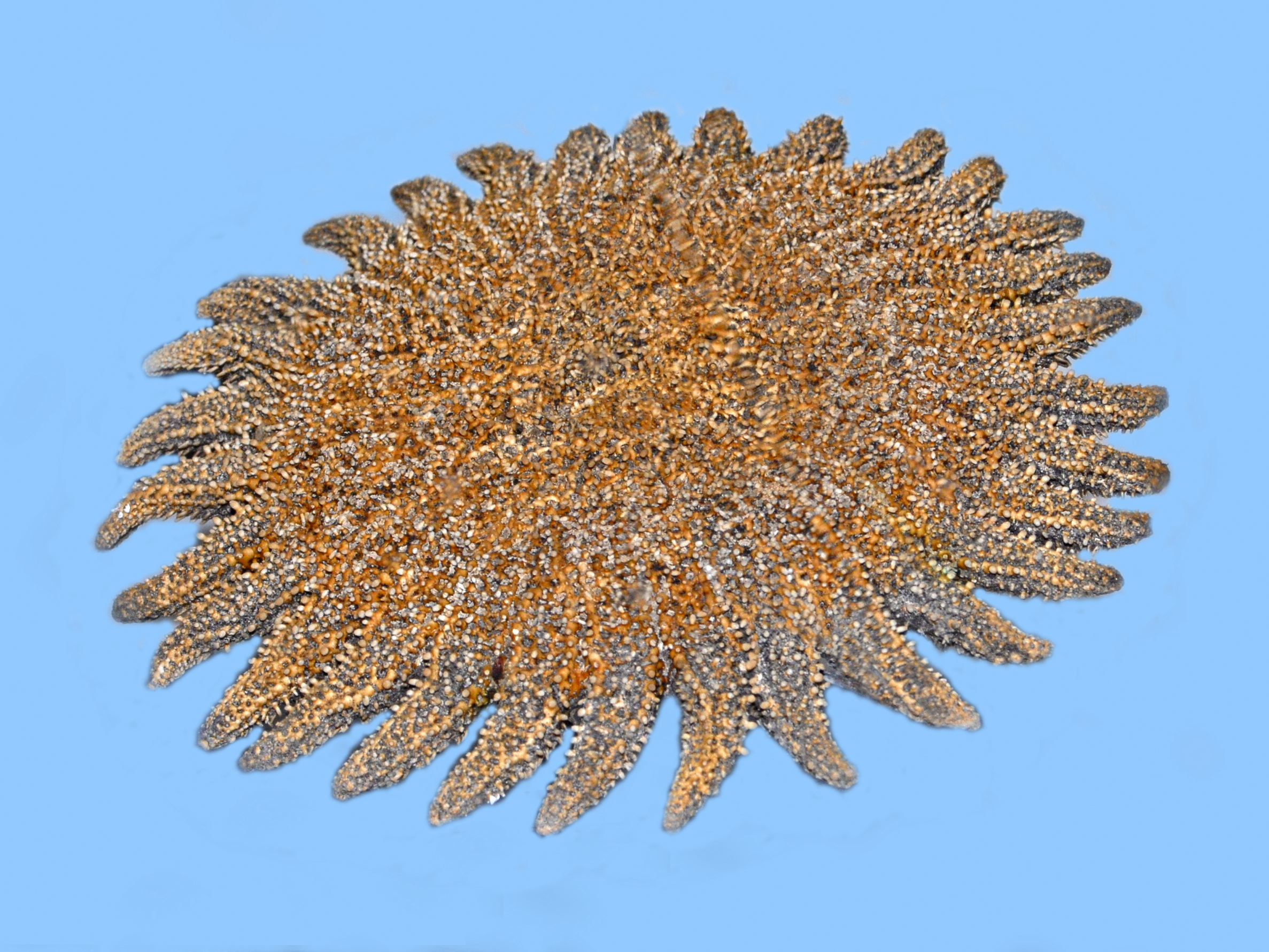
  - A preserved Heliaster microbrachius sea star
    †Heliaster microbrachius
- Helicina
- Helisoma
- Heloderma – tentative report
- †Hemiauchenia
  - †Hemiauchenia macrocephala
- Hemipristis
  - †Hemipristis serra
- Here
- †Herodias
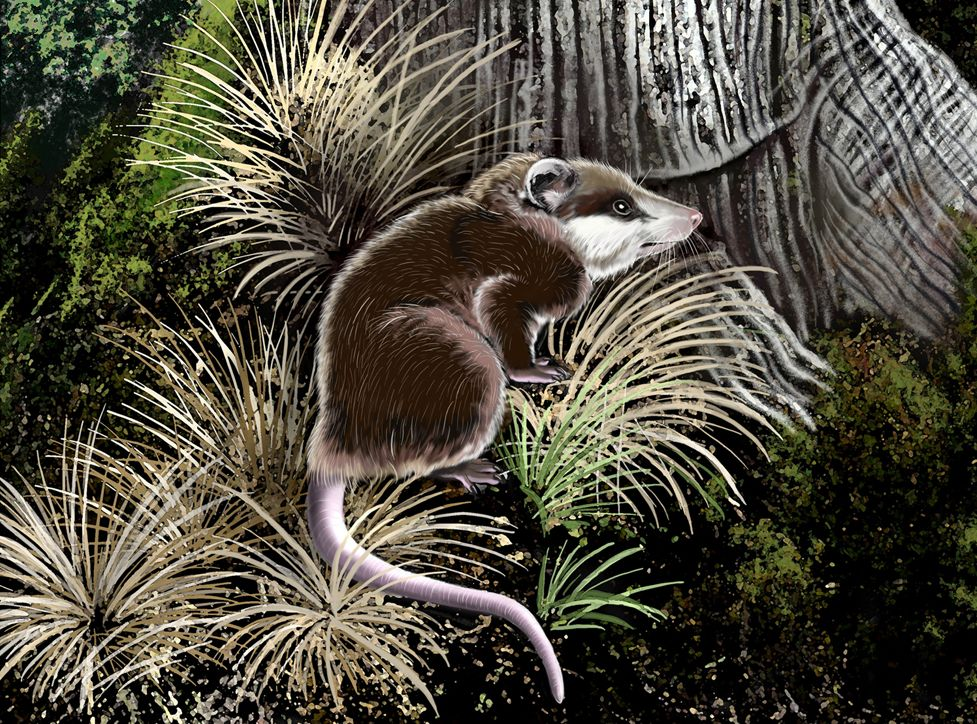
- Life restoration of the Eocene-Miocene mammal Herpetotherium
  †Herpetotherium
- Hespererato
  - †Hespererato maugeriae
- Hesperisternia
  - †Hesperisternia multangulus
- †Hesperotestudo
- Heterodon
  - †Heterodon platyrhinos
  - †Heterodon simus
- †Hexameryx – type locality for genus
- Hexaplex
  - †Hexaplex fulvescens
- Hiatella
  - †Hiatella arctica
- Himantopus
- Himerometra
- Hindsia
- Hindsiclava
- †Hipparion
- Hipponix
- †Hippotherium
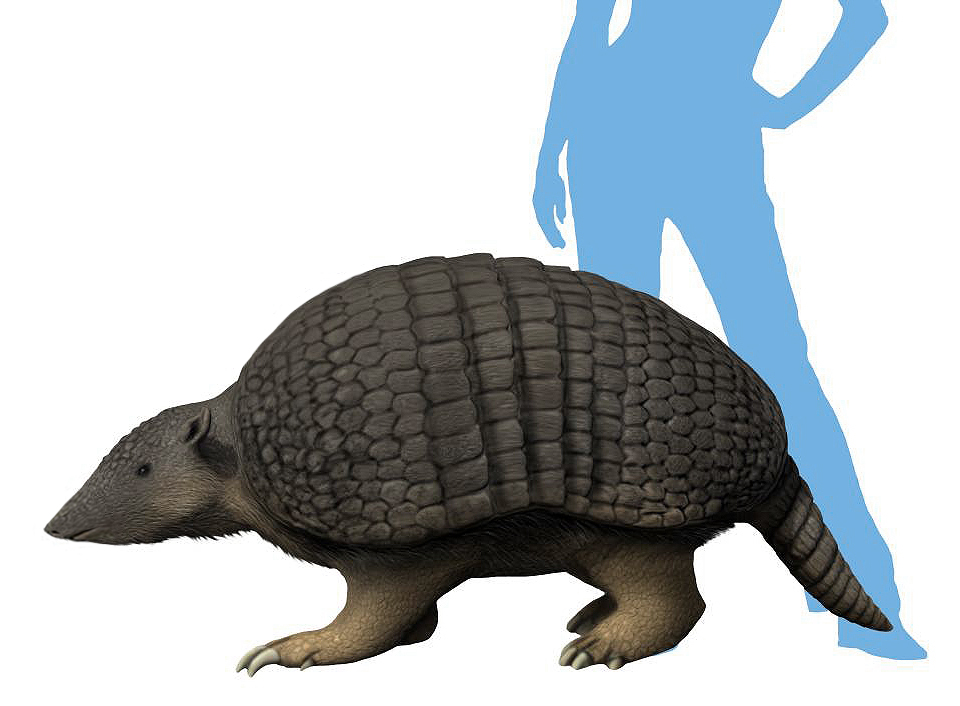
- Life restoration of the Pleistocene armadillo relative Holmesina with a human to scale
  †Holmesina
- †Homiphoca
- Homo
  - †Homo sapiens
- †Homotherium
  - †Homotherium serum
- †Humboldtiana – tentative report
- Hyalina
- Hydrobia – report made of unidentified related form or using admittedly obsolete nomenclature
- Hydrochoerus
- Hyla
  - †Hyla cinerea
  - †Hyla femoralis
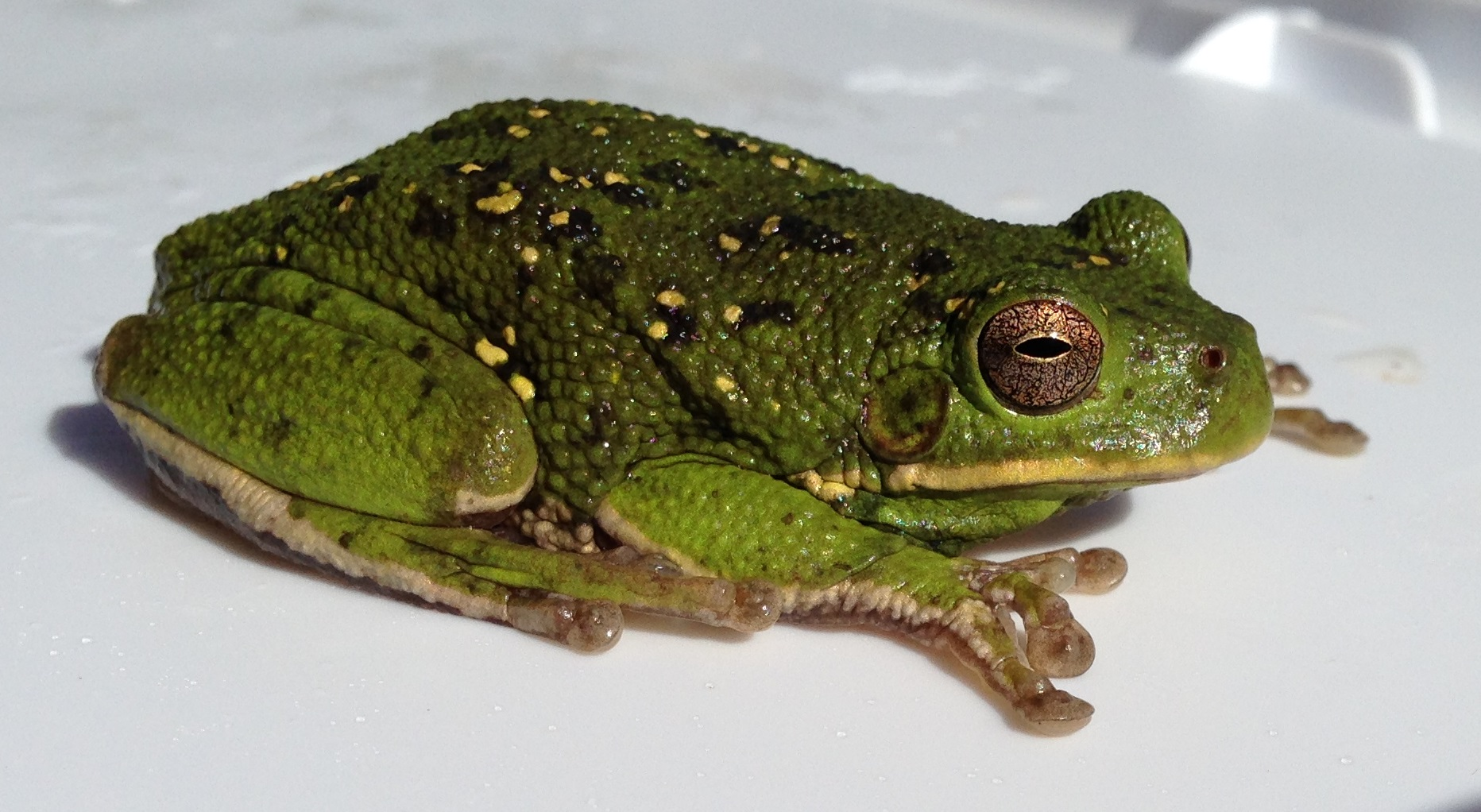
  - A living Hyla gratiosa, or barking tree frog
    †Hyla gratiosa
- Hylocichla – or unidentified comparable form
  - †Hylocichla mustelina
- Hyotissa
- †Hypohippus
- †Hypolagus
- Ictalurus
  - †Ictalurus catus – or unidentified comparable form
- Ilex
  - Ilex glabra
- Ilyanassa
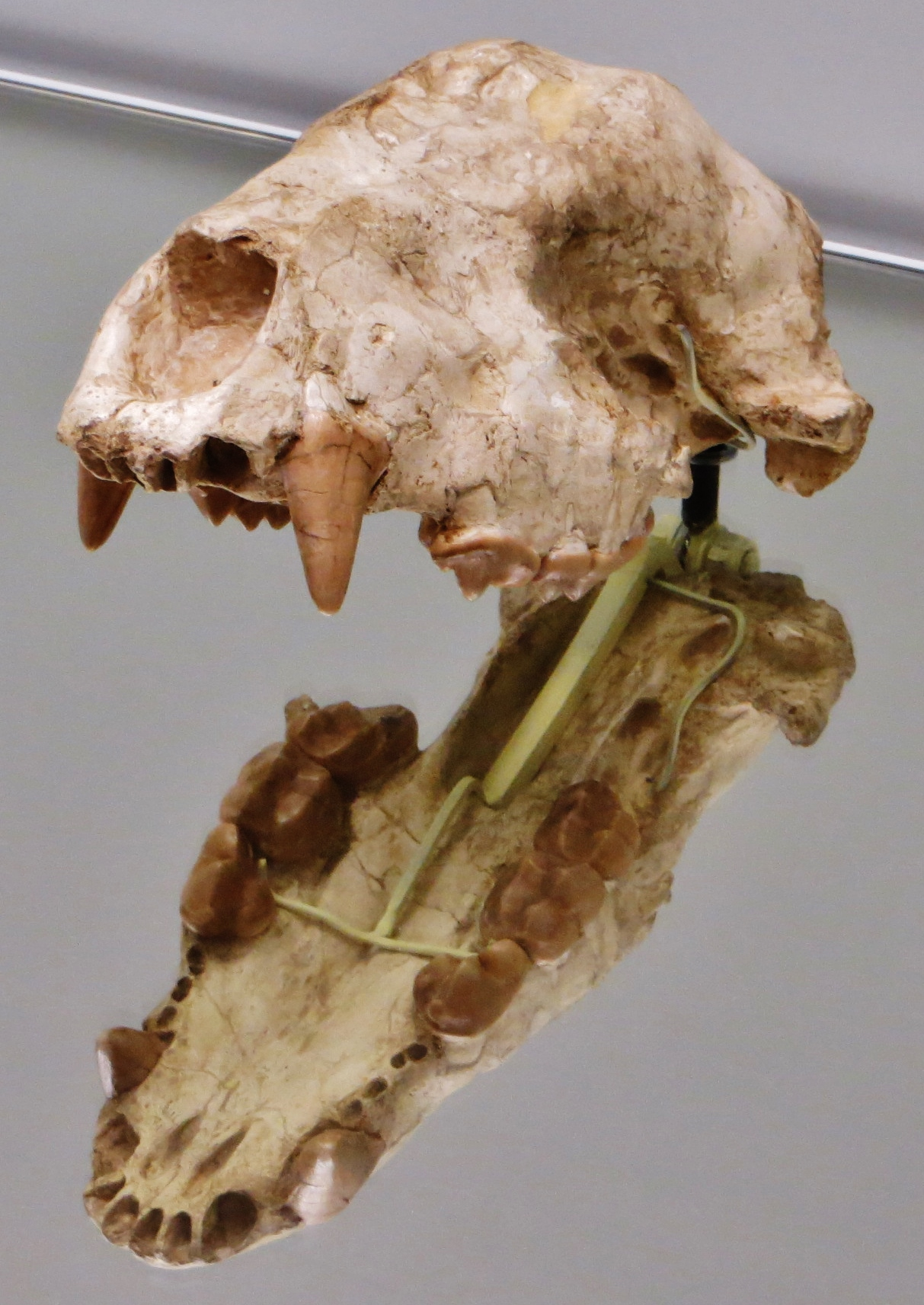
- Fossilized skull of the Miocene bear Indarctos
  †Indarctos
- †Inodrillia
  - †Inodrillia aepynota
- Ischnochiton
- Isognomon
  - †Isognomon alatus
  - †Isognomon radiatus – tentative report
- Isophyllia
  - †Isophyllia sinuosa
- Isurus
  - †Isurus oxyrinchus
- Ithycythara
  - †Ithycythara lanceolata
  - †Ithycythara psila
- Ixobrychus
  - †Ixobrychus exilis
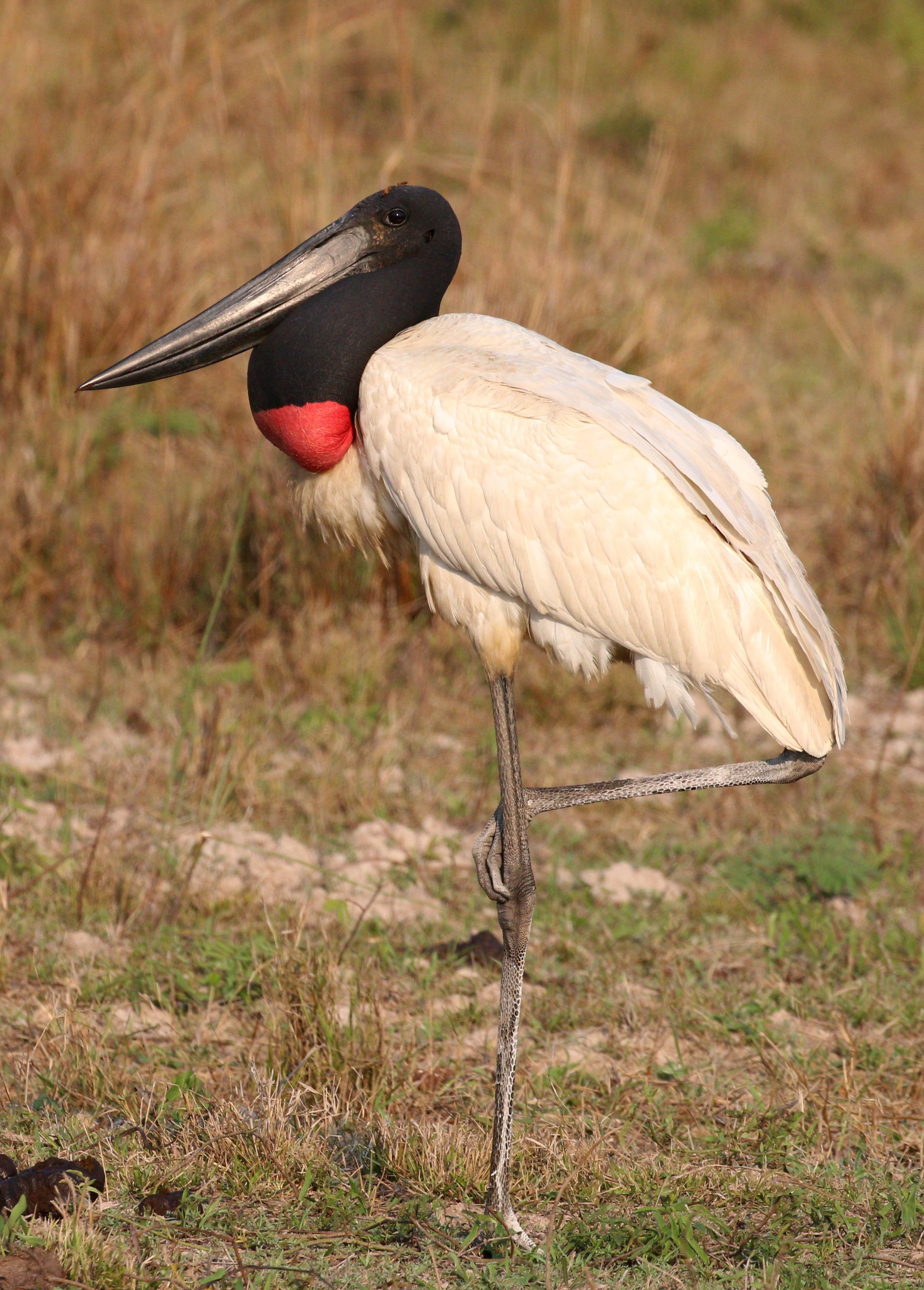
- A living Jabiru mycteria stork
  Jabiru
  - †Jabiru mycteria – type locality for species
- Jacana
  - †Jacana spinosa
- Japonactaeon
  - †Japonactaeon punctostriatus
- Jaspidella
  - †Jaspidella jaspidea – tentative report
- †Jenkinsia – or unidentified comparable form
- Jenneria
- †Jordanella
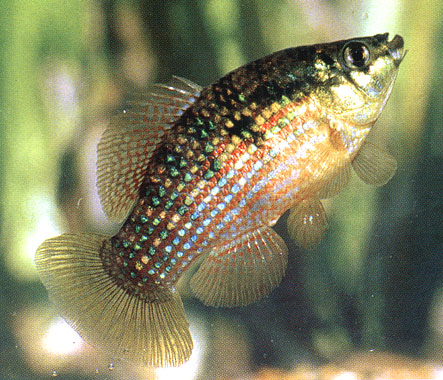
  - A living Jordanella floridae, or American flagfish
    †Jordanella floridae
- Julia
- Junco
  - †Junco hyemalis
- Kinosternon
  - †Kinosternon subrubrum
- Knefastia
- †Kogiopsis – type locality for genus
  - †Kogiopsis floridana – type locality for species
- Kuphus
- Kurtziella
  - †Kurtziella cerina
  - †Kurtziella limonitella
  - †Kurtziella serta
- †Kyptoceras
- †Lachnolaimus
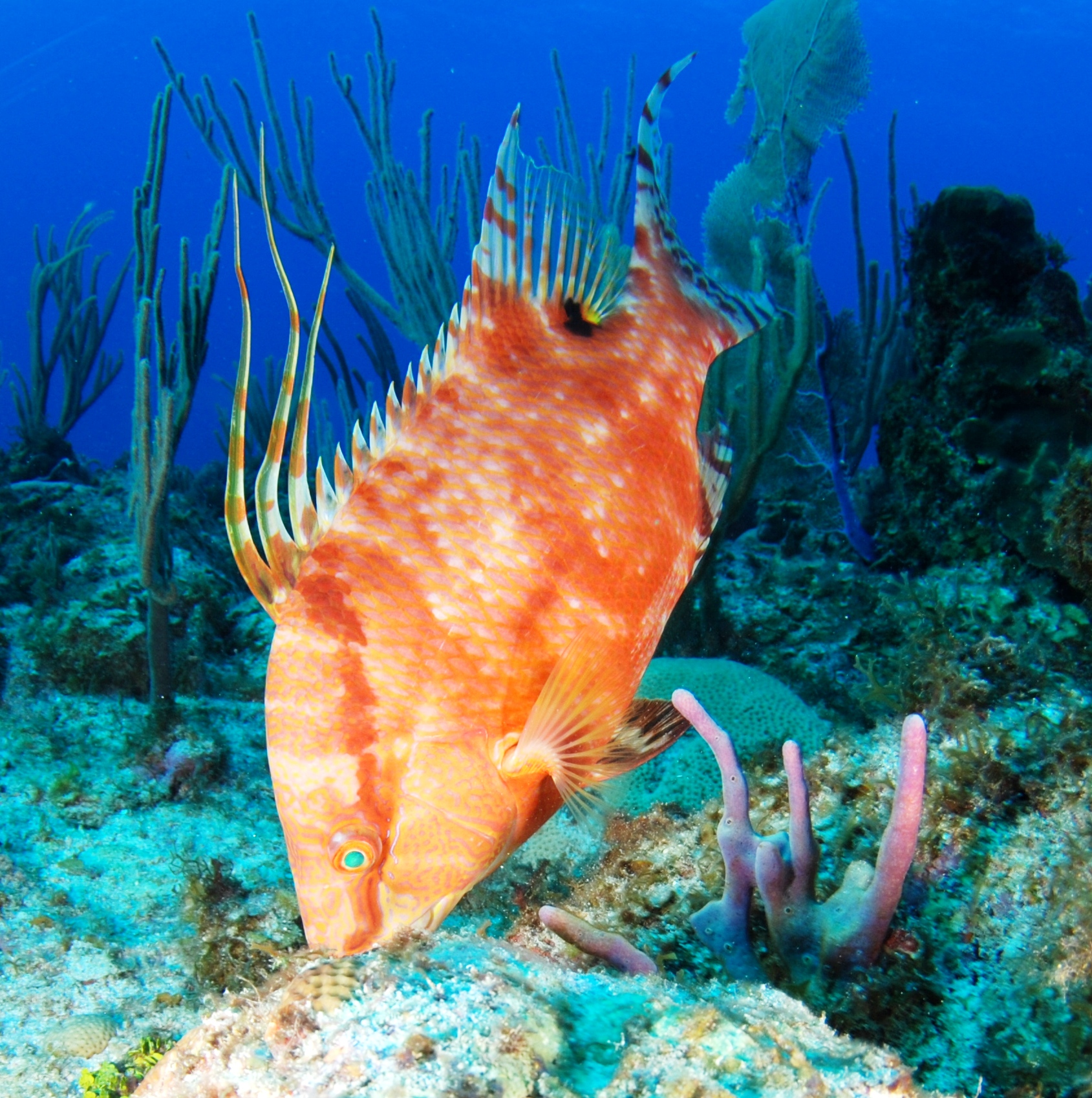
  - A living Lachnolaimus maximus, or hogfish
    †Lachnolaimus maximus
- †Lactophrys
- Laevapex
- Laevicardium
  - †Laevicardium mortoni
- Lagena
- †Lagodon
  - †Lagodon rhomboides
- †Laguna
- Lampropeltis
  - †Lampropeltis getulus
- Lanius
  - †Lanius ludovicianus
- Larus
- Lasiurus
  - †Lasiurus borealis
  - †Lasiurus intermedius
- Laterallus
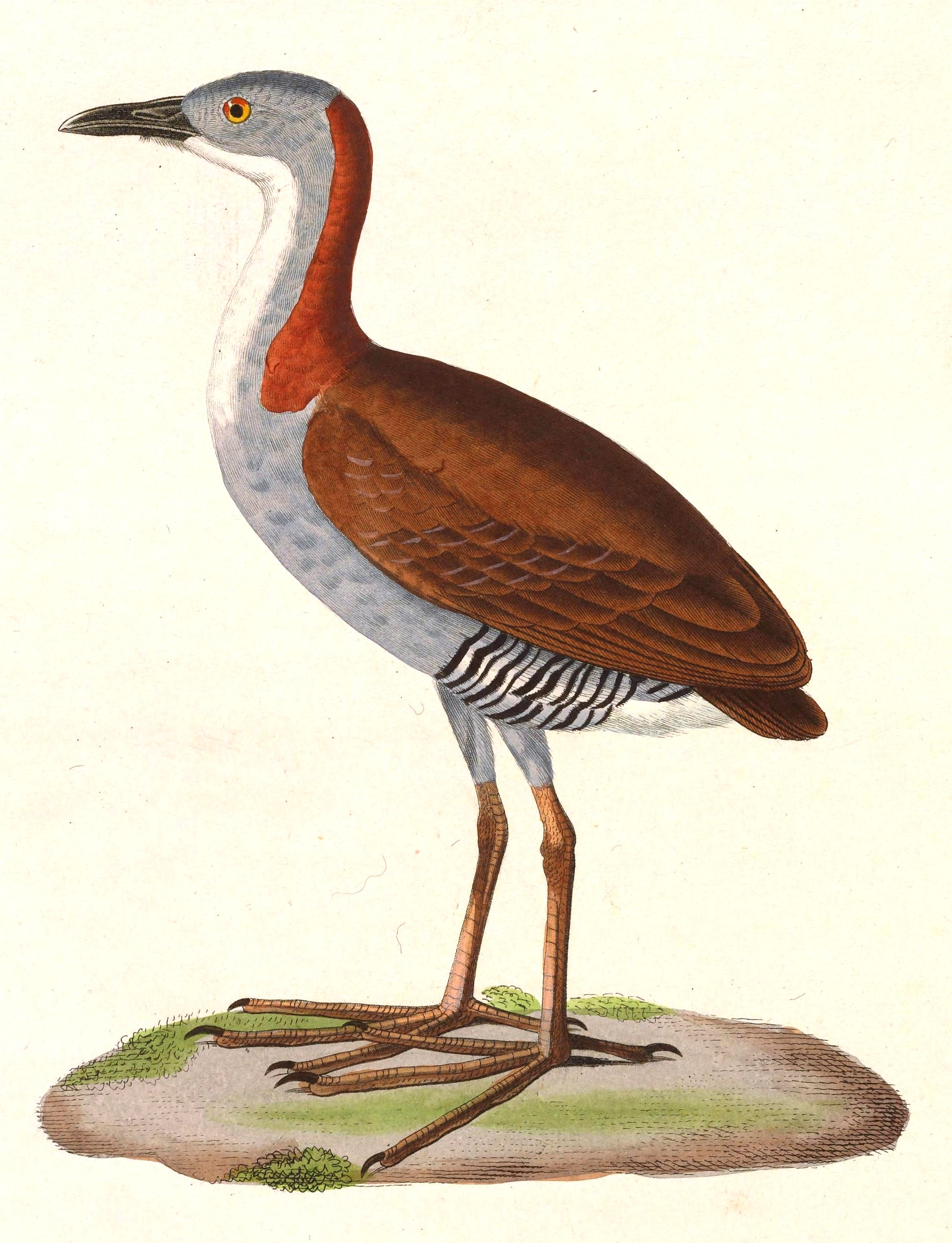
  - Illustration of a living Laterallus exilis, or grey-breasted crake
    †Laterallus exilis – or unidentified comparable form
- Latirus
  - †Latirus jucundus
  - †Latirus maxwelli
- Leiocephalus – tentative report
- Leiostomus
  - †Leiostomus xanthurus
- †Leitneria
  - †Leitneria floridana
- Leopardus
  - †Leopardus pardalis
  - †Leopardus wiedii
- Lepidochelys
- Lepisosteus
- Lepomis
  - †Lepomis gulosus – or unidentified comparable form
  - †Lepomis microlophus
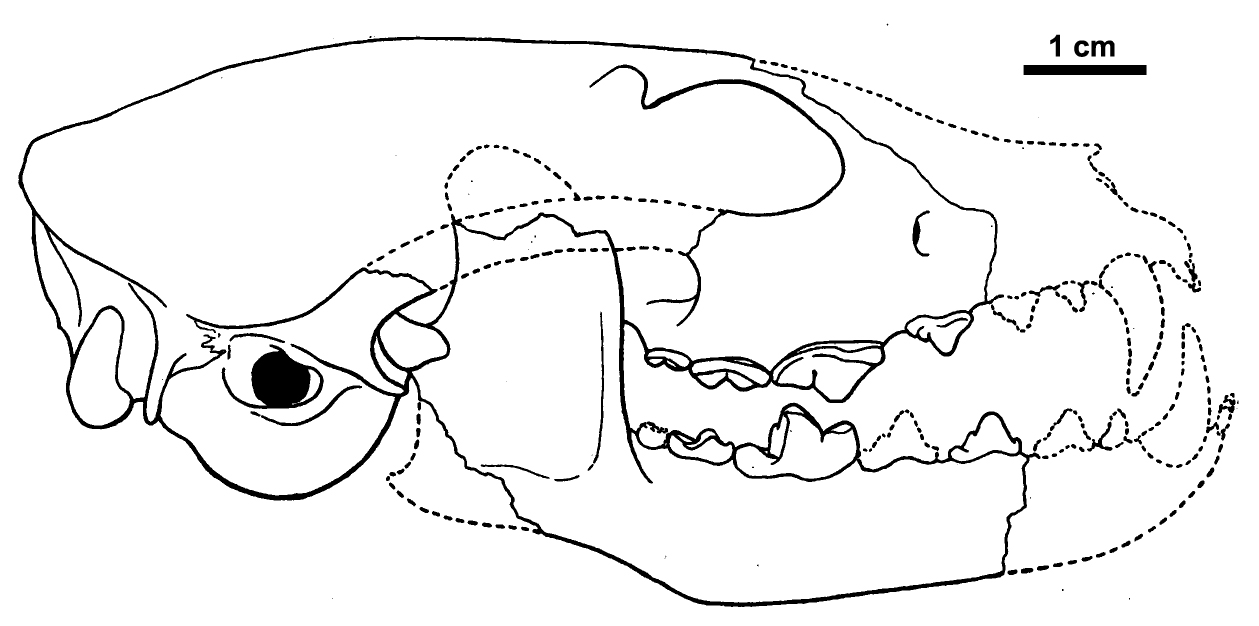
- Illustration of a fossilized skull of the Oligocene-Miocene dog Leptocyon
  †Leptocyon – tentative report
- Lepus
  - †Lepus townsendii – or unidentified comparable form
  - †Leucophoyx thula
- Lima
- Limaria
- Limatula
  - Limatula subauriculata
- Limnodromus
  - †Limnodromus scolopaceus
- †Limosa
- Linatella
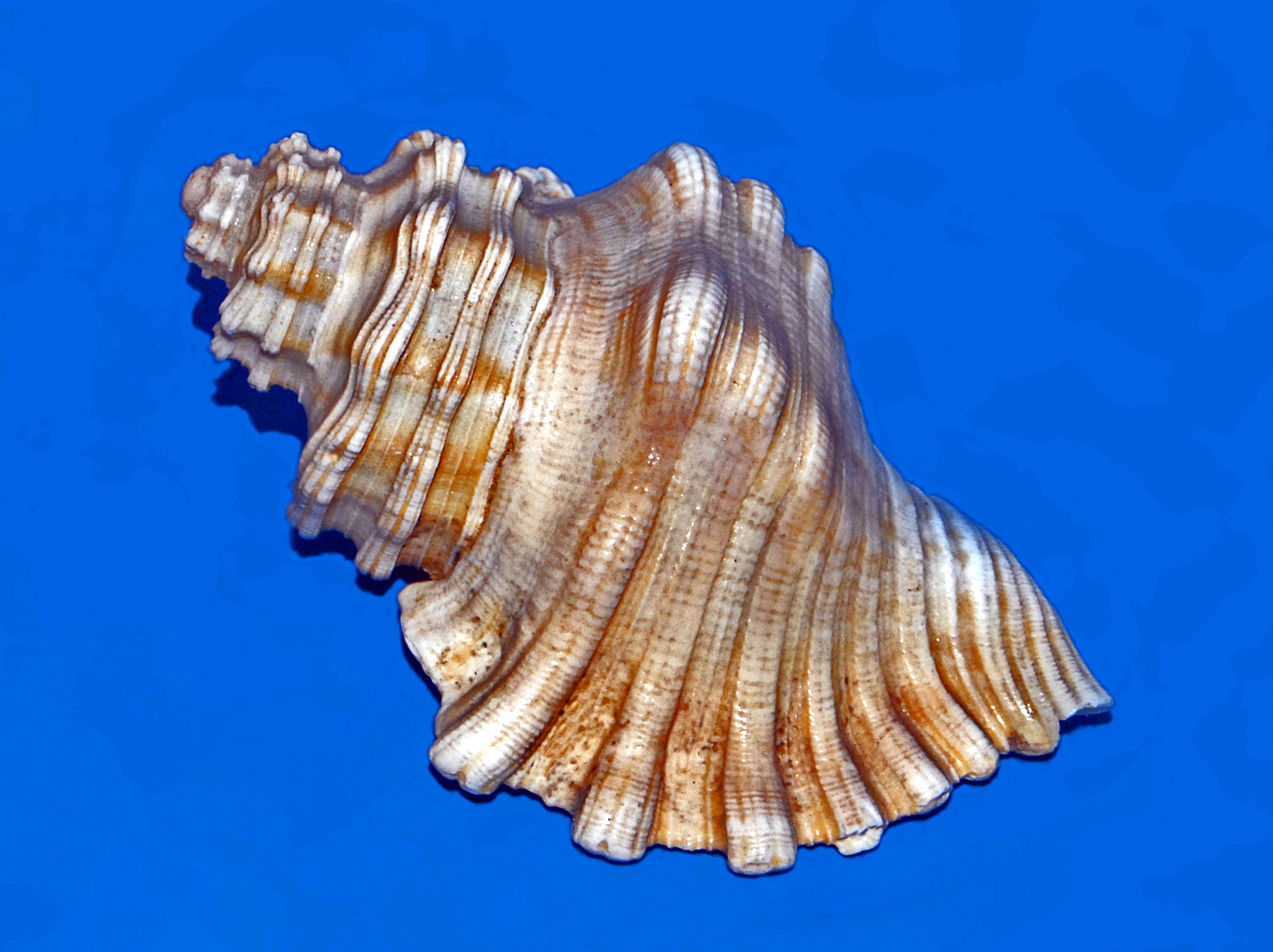
  - Shell of a Linatella triton sea snail
    †Linatella caudata
- Linga
- Lioglyphostoma
- Liotia
- †Liquidambar
- Lithophaga
  - †Lithophaga antillarum
  - †Lithophaga aristata – tentative report
  - †Lithophaga bisulcata
  - †Lithophaga nigra
- Lithophyllum
- Lithopoma
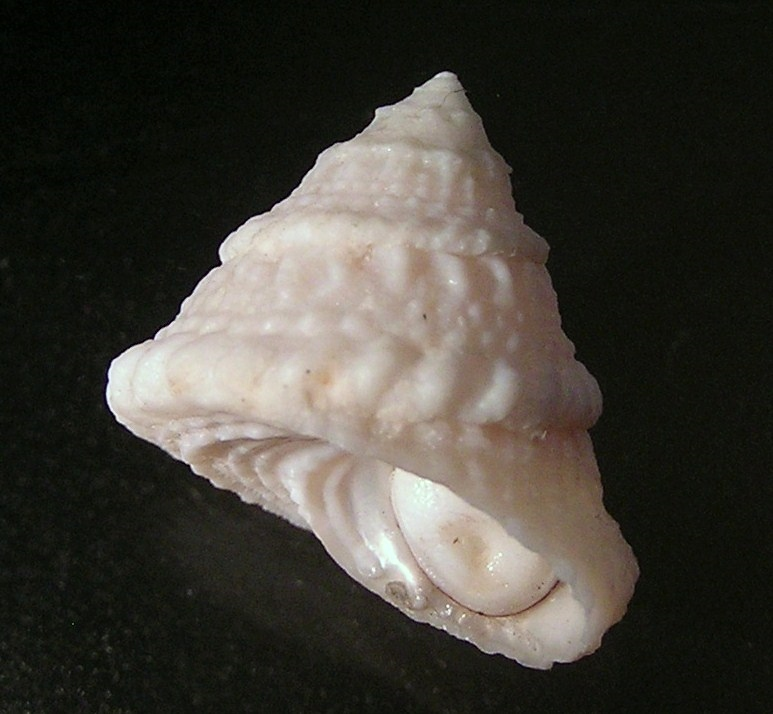
  - Shell of a Lithopoma americanum turban sea snail
    †Lithopoma americanum
- Lithothamnion
- Litiopa
- Littoraria
  - †Littoraria angulifera
  - †Littoraria irrorata
- Littorina
- Lobatus
  - †Lobatus costatus
  - Lobatus gigas
  - †Lobatus raninus
- Longchaeus
  - †Longchaeus suturalis
- Lontra
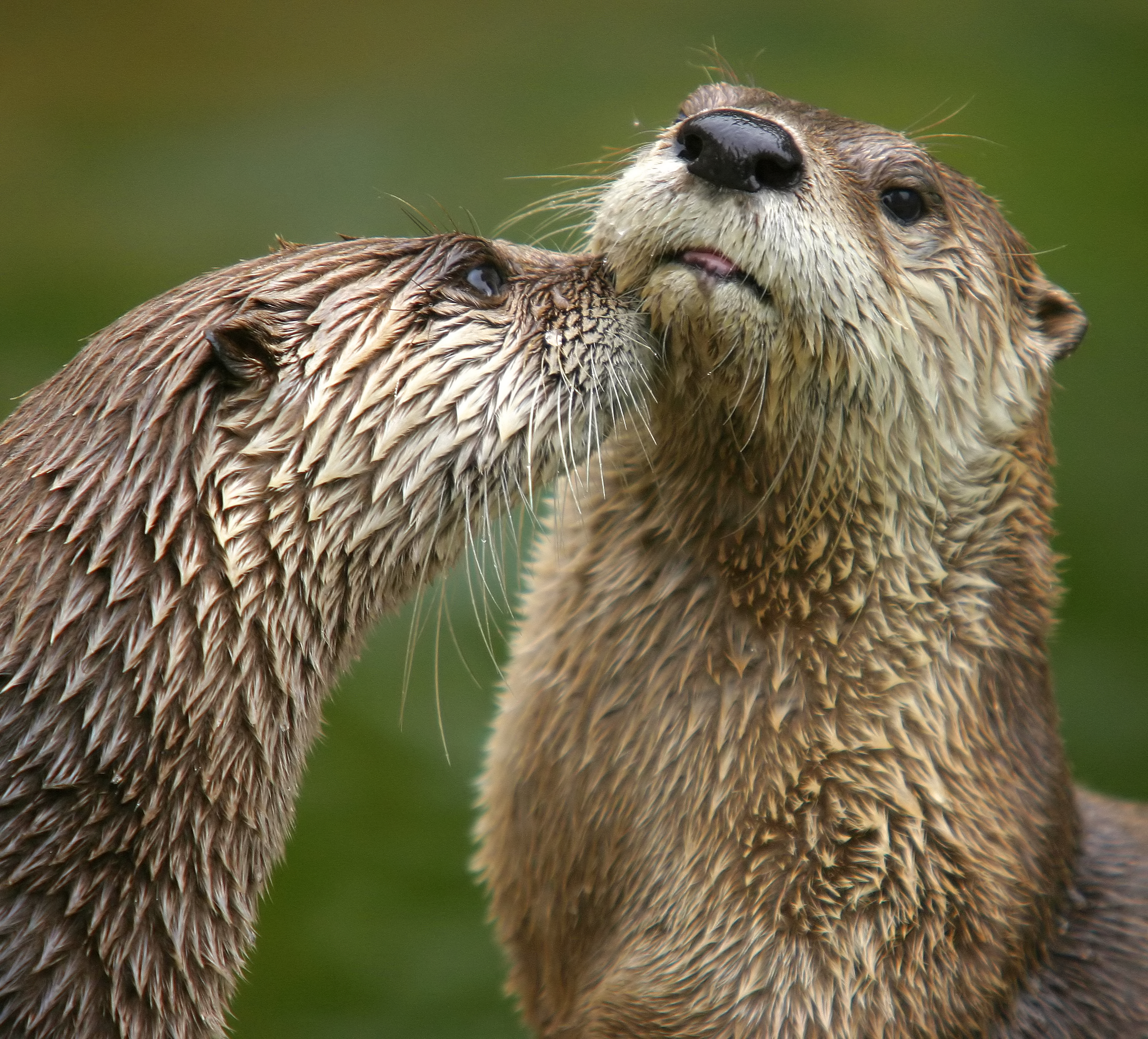
  - Pair of living Lontra canadensis, or North American river otter
    †Lontra canadensis
- Lophelia
  - †Lophelia prolifera
- †Lophocetus – or unidentified related form
- Lophodytes
  - †Lophodytes cucullatus
- Lottia
- Lovenia
- Lucapina
  - †Lucapina sowerbii
  - †Lucapina suffusa
- Lucapinella
  - †Lucapinella limatula
- Lucina
  - Lucina pensylvanica
- Luidia
- Luria
- †Lutjanus
- Lynx
  - Lynx rufus
- Lyria
- Lytechinus
  - †Lytechinus variegatus
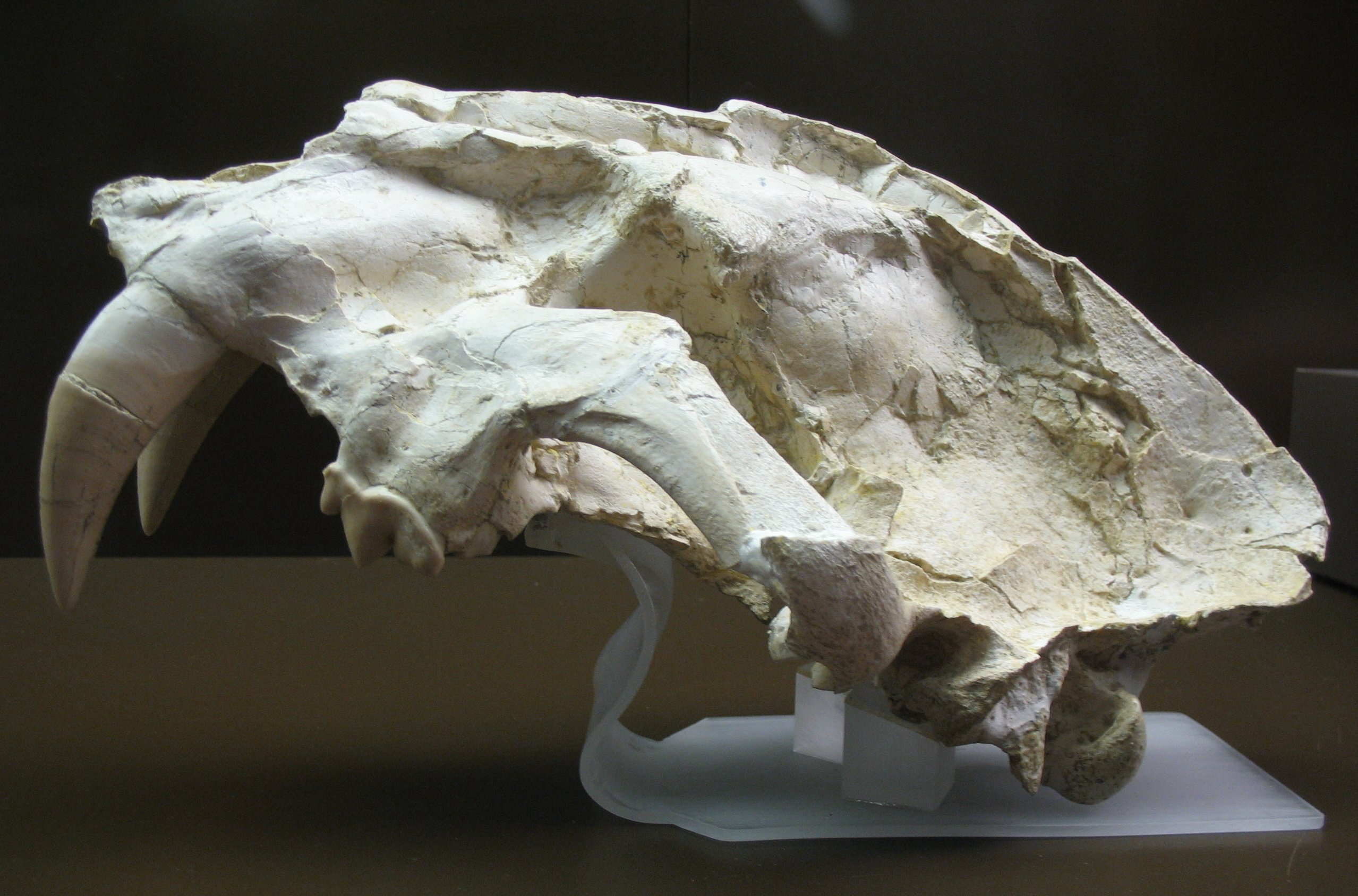
- Fossilized cranium of the Miocene-Pleistocene saber-toothed cat Machairodus
  †Machairodus
- Macoma
  - †Macoma tenta
- Macrocallista
  - Macrocallista maculata
  - Macrocallista nimbosa
- Macrochelys
  - †Macrochelys temminckii
- Macrocypraea
  - †Macrocypraea cervus
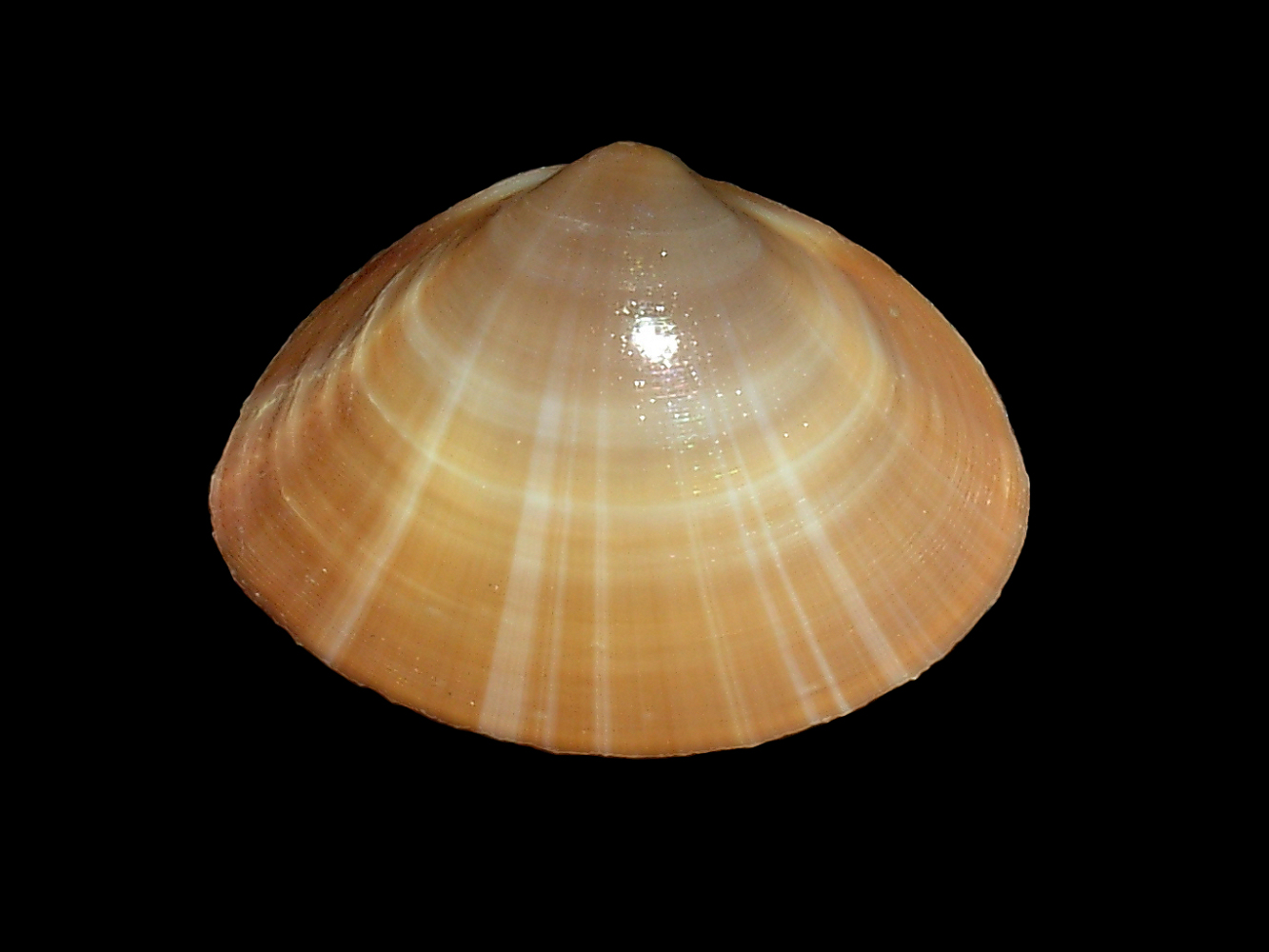
- Shell of a Mactra marine bivalve, also known as trough shells or duck clams
  Mactra
- Madrepora
  - †Madrepora oculata
- Magilus
- Magnolia
  - †Magnolia virginiana
- Malaclemys
  - †Malaclemys terrapin
- Malea
- †Mammacyon
- †Mammut
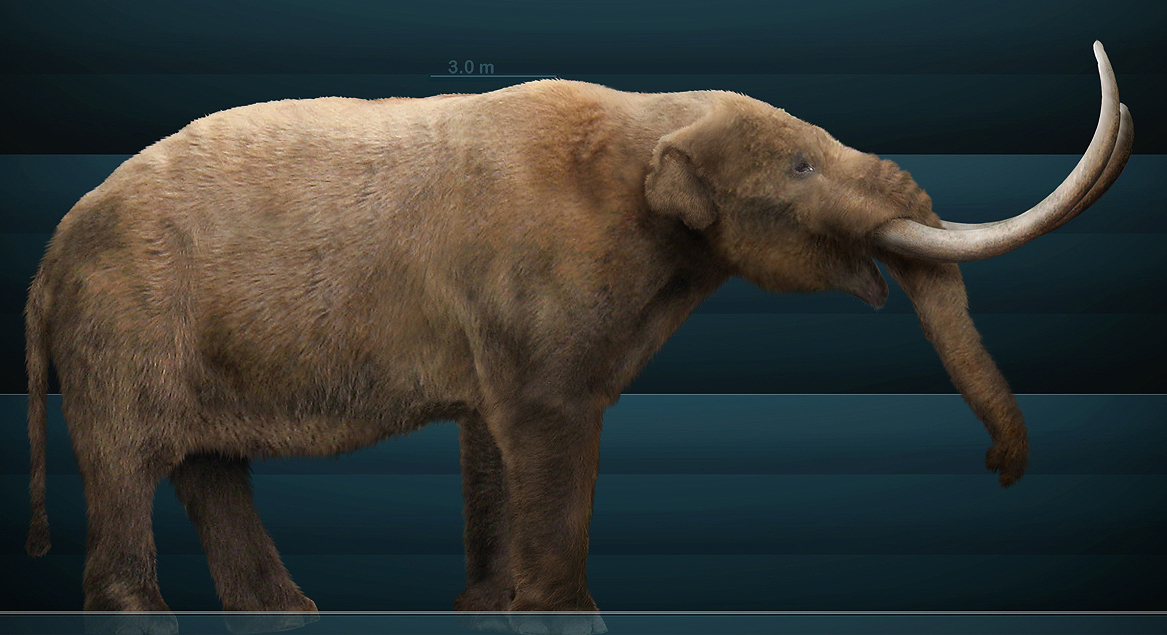
  - Restoration of a Mammut americanum, or American mastodon
    †Mammut americanum
  - †Mammut matthewi
- †Mammuthus
  - †Mammuthus columbi – type locality for species
- Manicina
  - †Manicina areolata
- Maoricrypta
  - †Maoricrypta costata
- Margaretta
- †Margaritaria
- Margarites
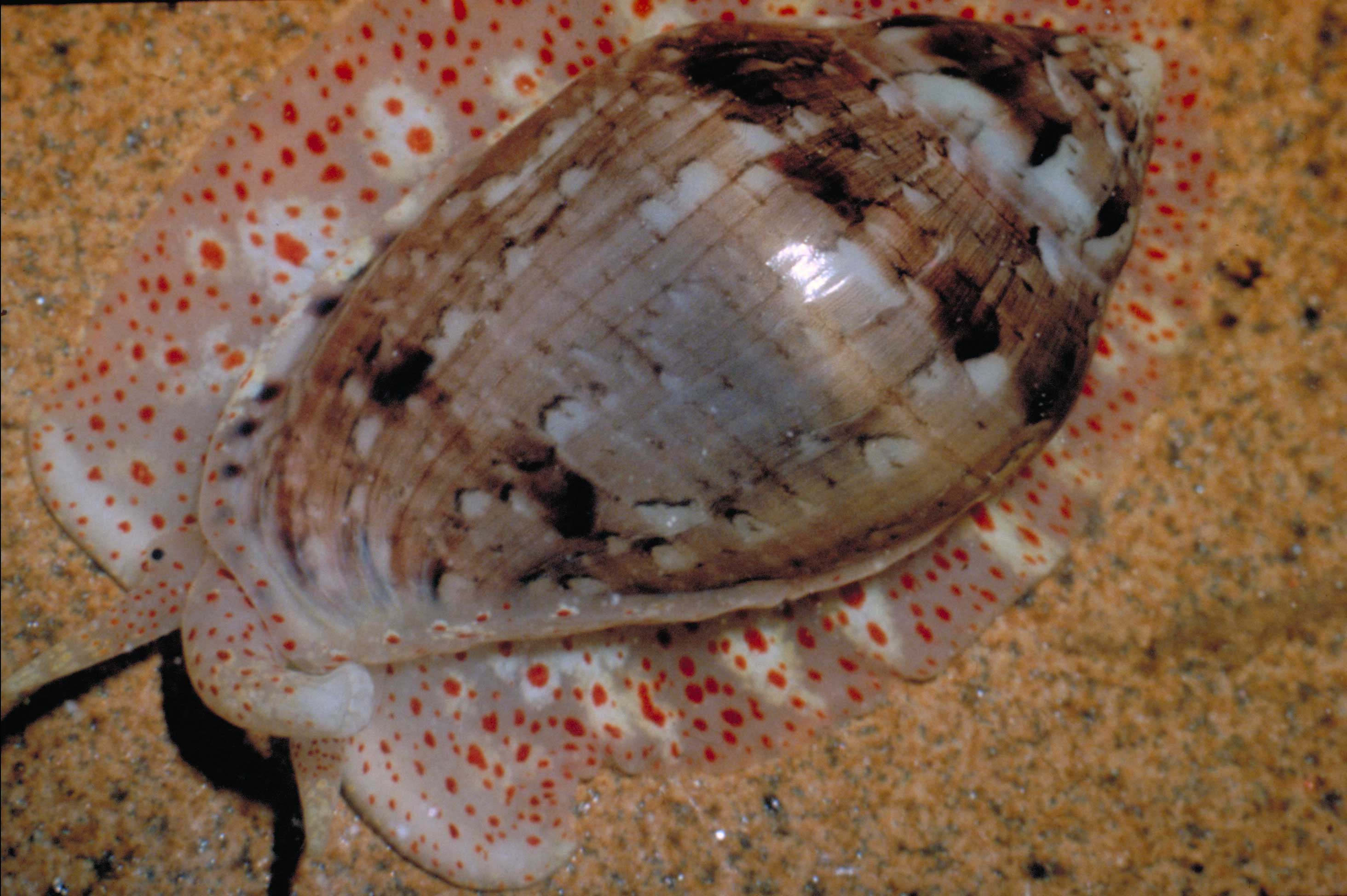
- A living Marginella margin sea snail
  Marginella
- Marsupina
  - †Marsupina bufo
- Martesia
- Massyla
- Masticophis
  - †Masticophis flagellum
- Meandrina
  - †Meandrina meandrites
- Megabalanus
  - †Megabalanus tintinnabulum
- Megaceryle
  - †Megaceryle alcyon
- †Megahippus
- †Megalictis
- †Megalonyx
  - †Megalonyx jeffersonii
  - †Megalonyx leptostomus
  - †Megalonyx wheatleyi
- Megalops
  - †Megalops atlanticus
- †Megantereon
- Megaptera
- Meioceras
  - †Meioceras nitidum
- Melampus
  - †Melampus bidentatus
  - †Melampus coffea
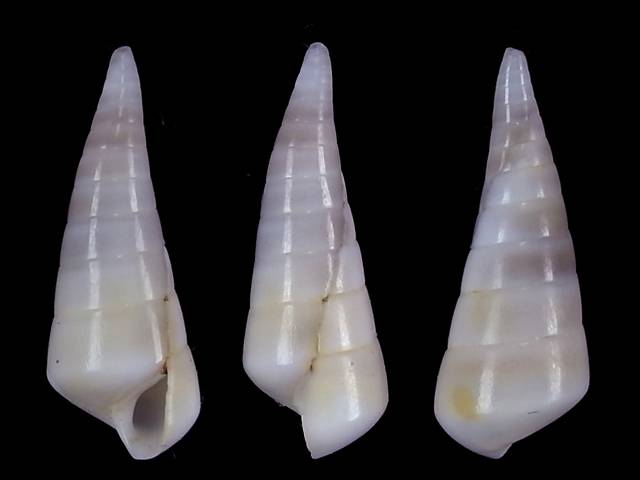
- Shells in differing orientations of the parasitic sea snail Melanella
  Melanella
  - †Melanella conoidea
- Melanerpes
  - †Melanerpes carolinus
  - †Melanerpes erythrocephalus
- Meleagris
  - †Meleagris gallopavo – type locality for species
  - †Mellita quinquiesperforata
- Melongena
  - †Melongena bispinosa - locally extinct
  - Melongena corona
  - †Melongena melongena - locally extinct
- Melospiza
  - †Melospiza georgiana
  - †Melospiza melodia
- Membranipora – or unidentified comparable form
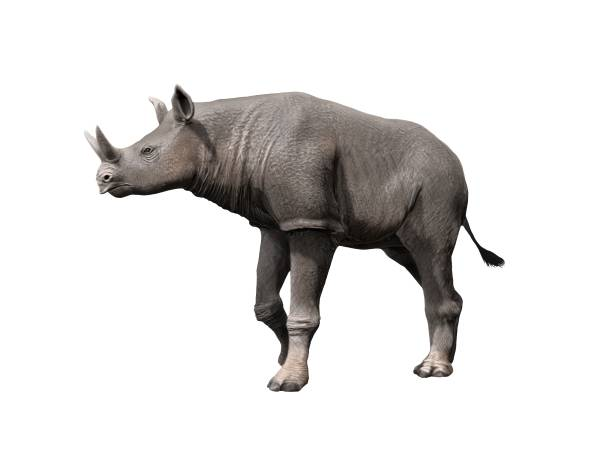
- Life restoration of the Miocene rhinoceros Menoceras
  †Menoceras
- Menticirrhus
- Mephitis
  - †Mephitis mephitis
- Mercenaria
  - Mercenaria campechiensis
  - †Mercenaria langdoni
  - Mercenaria mercenaria
  - †Mercenaria permagna
- Meretrix
- Mergus
  - †Mergus merganser
  - †Mergus serrator
- †Merychippus
- †Merycoidodon
- Mesoplodon
- †Mesoreodon
- †Metatomarctus
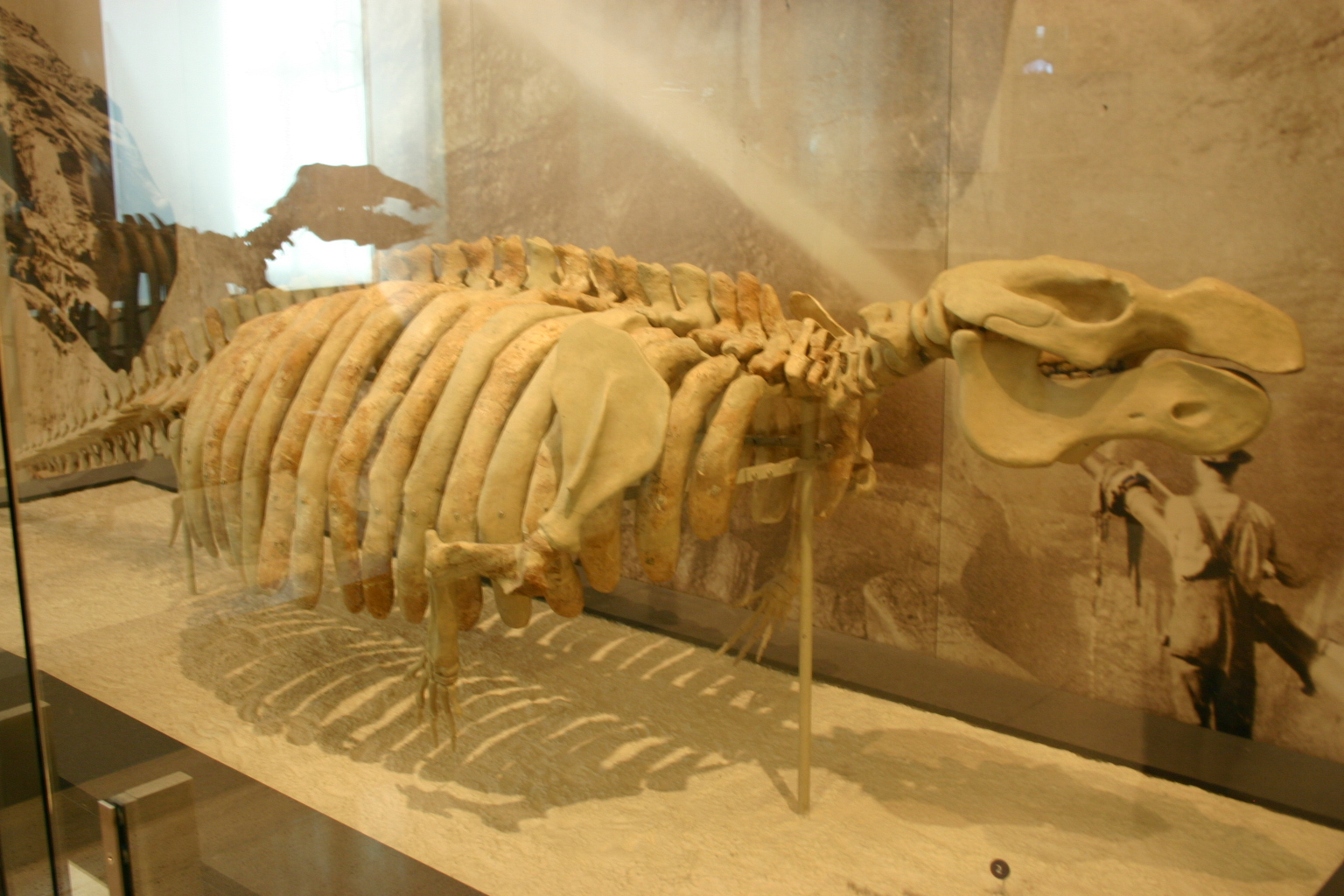
- Mounted fossilized skeleton of the Miocene-Pleistocene manatee relative Metaxytherium
  †Metaxytherium – type locality for genus
- Metula
- Microdrillia
- Microhyla
- Micropogonias
- Micropora
- Micropterus
  - †Micropterus salmoides
- Microtus
  - †Microtus pennsylvanicus
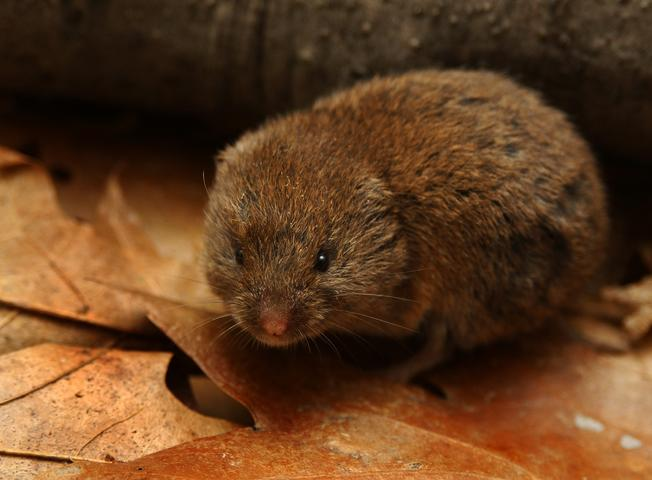
  - A living Microtus pinetorum, or woodland vole
    Microtus pinetorum
- Micrurus
  - †Micrurus fulvius
- Millepora
  - †Millepora alcicornis
- Milvago
  - †Milvago chimachima
- †Mimus
  - †Mimus polyglottos
- †Miohippus
- †Miopetaurista
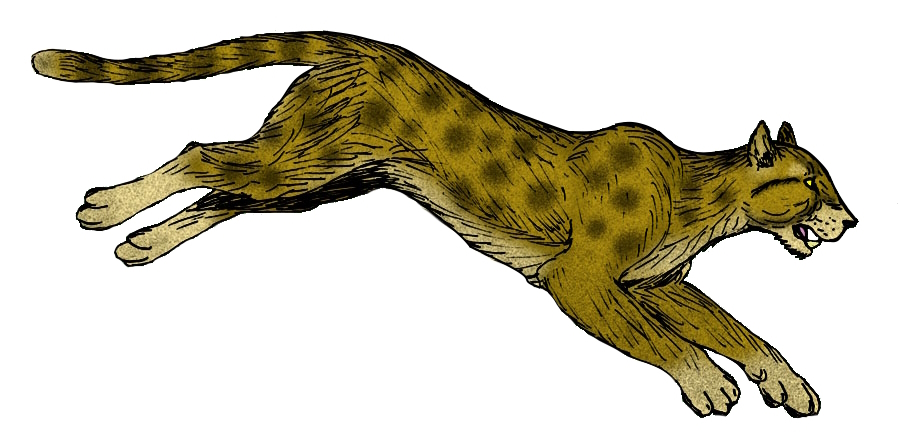
- Restoration of the Pliocene-Pleistocene Miracinonyx, or American cheetah
  †Miracinonyx
  - †Miracinonyx inexpectatus
- Mitra
  - †Mitra semiferruginea
- Mitrella
- Mitromorpha
  - †Mitromorpha dormitor
- Modiolus
  - †Modiolus americanus
- Modulus
  - †Modulus calusa
  - †Modulus carchedonius
  - †Modulus modulus
- Molothrus
  - †Molothrus ater
- Monilispira
- Monoplex
  - †Monoplex krebsii
  - †Monoplex parthenopeus
- †Monostiolum
- Mormoops
  - †Mormoops megalophylla
- †Moropus
  - †Morum oniscus
- Morus
- Mugil
- †Mulina
- Mulinia
  - †Mulinia lateralis
- Murex
- Murexiella
  - †Murexiella glypta
  - †Murexiella macgintyi – type locality for species
- Murexsul
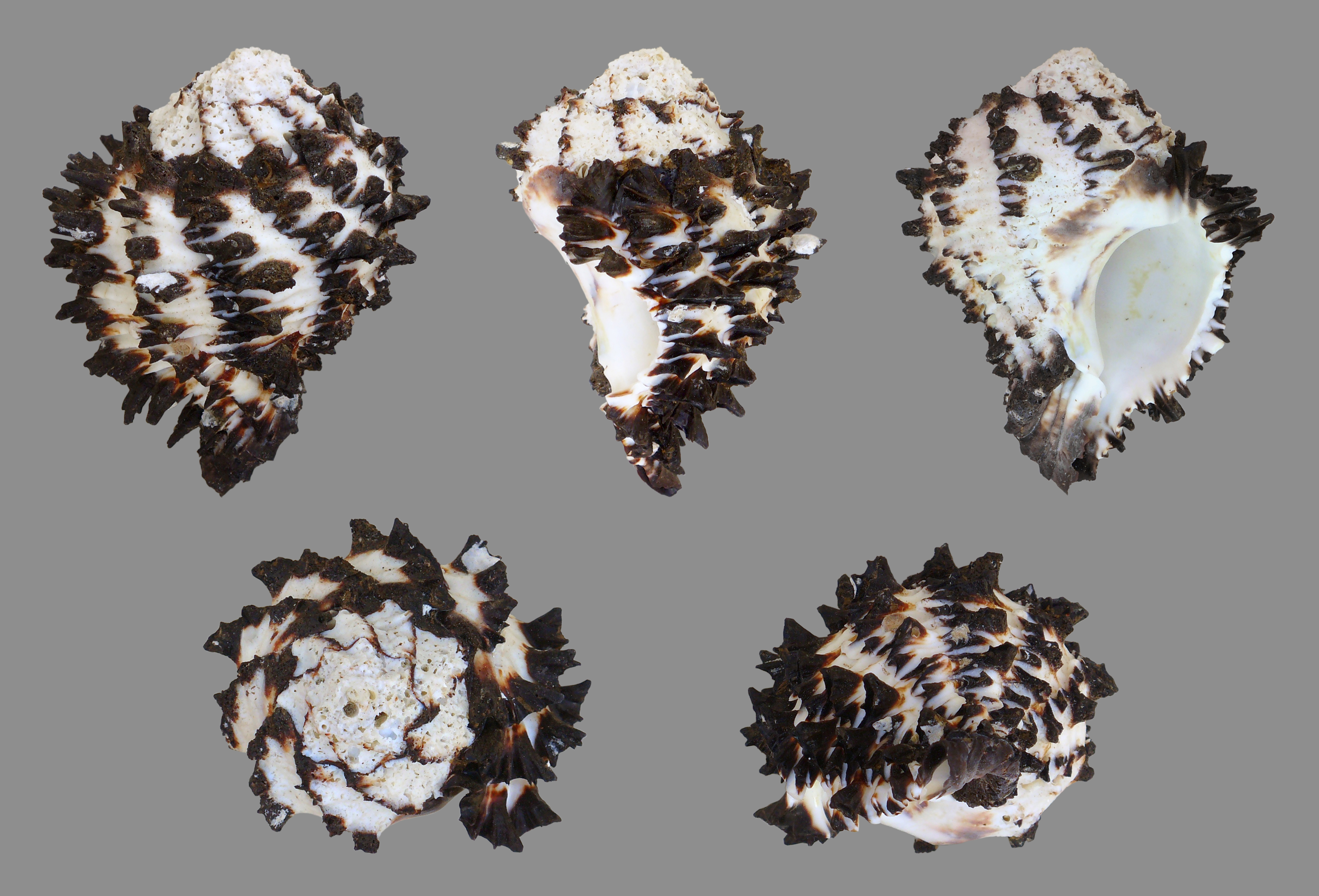
- Shell in multiple views of a Muricanthus murex sea snail
  Muricanthus
- Muricopsis
- Musculium
- Musculus
  - †Musculus lateralis
- Mussa
  - †Mussa angulosa
- Mussismilia
- Mustela
  - †Mustela frenata
- †Mya
  - †Mya arenaria
- Mycetophyllia
- Mycteria
  - †Mycteria americana
- †Mylagaulus
- Myliobatis
- †Mylodon
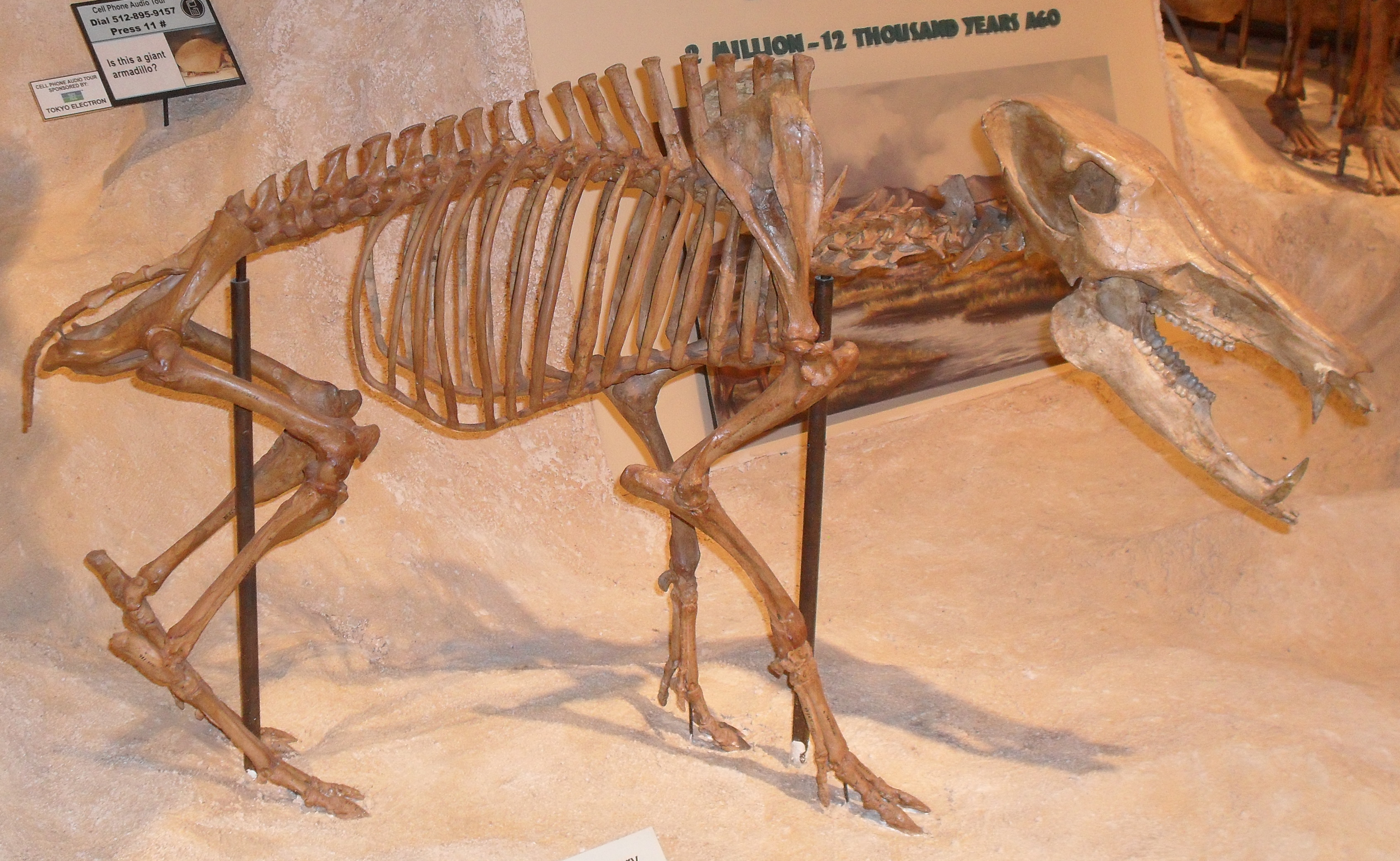
- Fossilized skeleton of the Pliocene-Holocene peccary Mylohyus
  †Mylohyus
  - †Mylohyus elmorei
  - †Mylohyus floridanus – type locality for species
  - †Mylohyus fossilis – type locality for species
- Myotis
  - †Myotis austroriparius
  - †Myotis grisescens
- Myrica
  - Myrica cerifera
- Mytilopsis
  - †Mytilopsis leucophaeata
- Mytilus
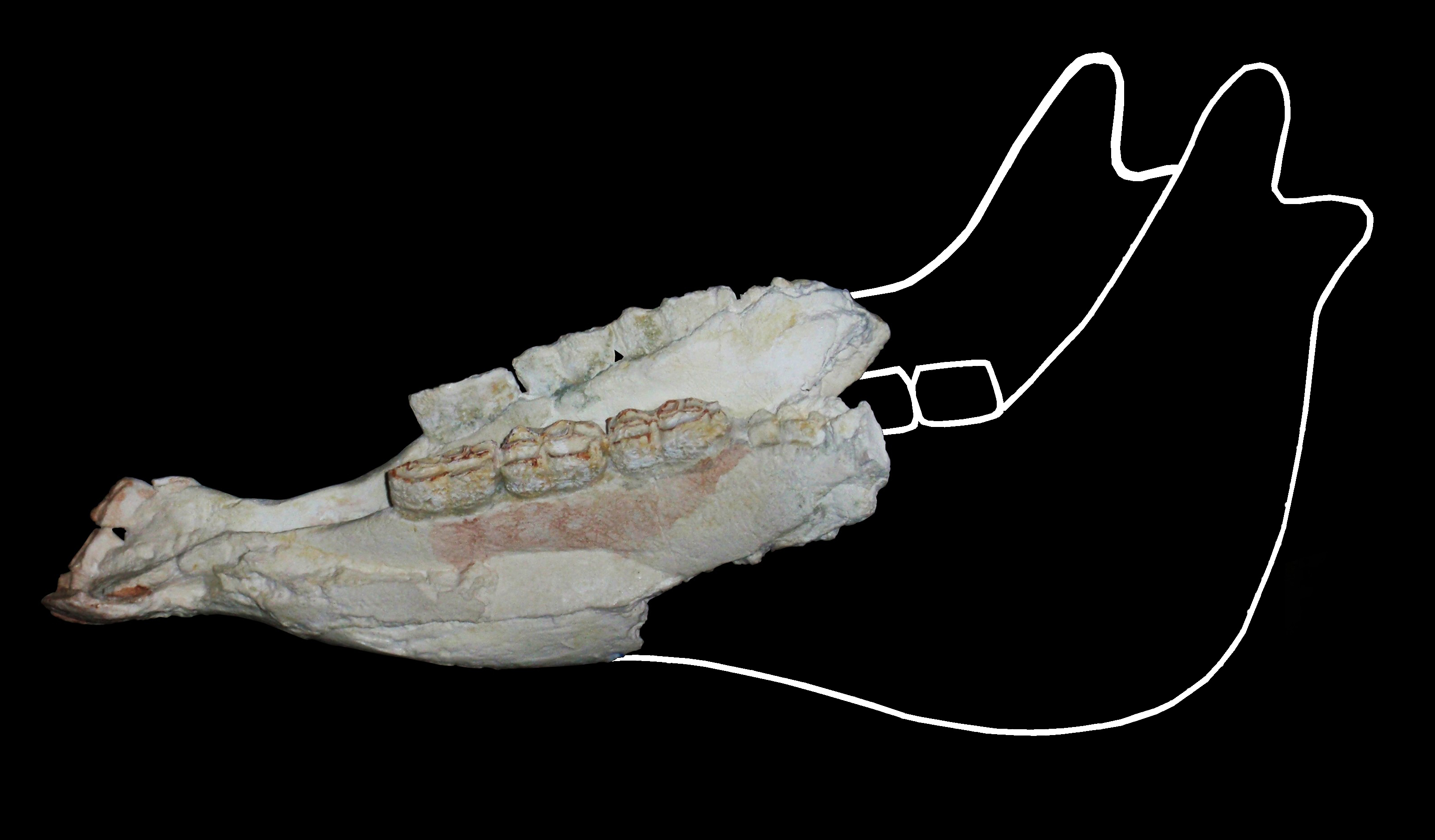
- Partial fossilized mandible of the Miocene-Pliocene horse Nannippus
  †Nannippus
- Nannodiella
- †Nanosiren – type locality for genus
  - †Nanosiren garciae – type locality for species
- †Nanotragulus
- Narona
- Nassa – report made of unidentified related form or using admittedly obsolete nomenclature
- Nassarina
  - Nassarina glypta
- Nassarius
  - †Nassarius acutus
  - †Nassarius antillarum
  - †Nassarius consensus – or unidentified comparable form
  - Nassarius vibex
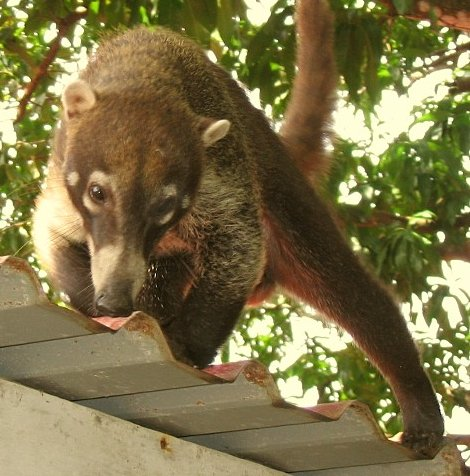
- A living Nasua, or coati
  Nasua – or unidentified comparable form
- Natica
- Naticarius
  - †Naticarius canrena
- Natrix
  - †Natrix cyclopion
  - †Natrix erythrogaster – or unidentified comparable form
- Necturus
- Negaprion
  - †Negaprion brevirostris
- †Neochoerus
  - †Neochoerus aesopi
  - †Neochoerus pinckneyi
- Neofiber
  - †Neofiber alleni
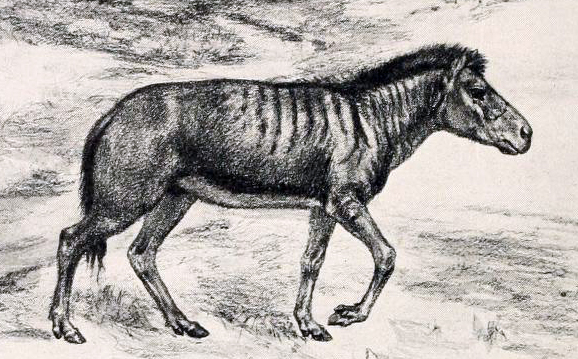
- Life restoration of a herd of Neohipparion. Robert Bruce Horsfall (1913).
  †Neohipparion
- Neomonachus
  - †Neomonachus tropicalis
- Neophrontops
- Neotoma
  - †Neotoma floridana
- Nerita
- Neritina
  - Neritina usnea
  - Neritina virginea
- Neritopsis
- Nerodia
  - †Nerodia fasciata
  - †Nerodia sipedon
  - †Nerodia taxispilota – or unidentified comparable form
- Nesovitrea
  - †Nettion crecca
- Neverita
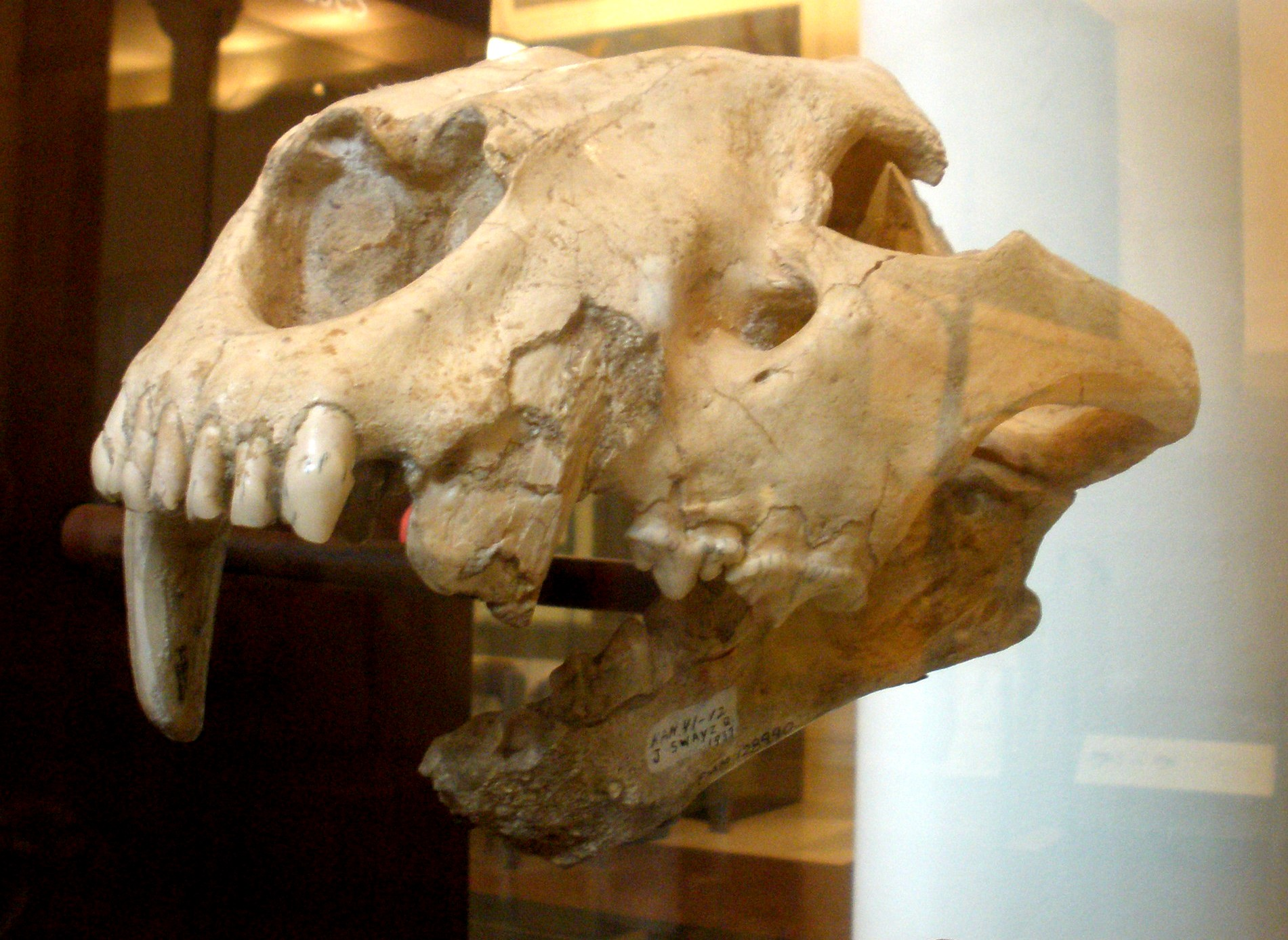
- Fossilized partial cranium of the Miocene saber-toothed cat Nimravides
  †Nimravides
- Niso
- Nitidella
  - †Nitidella nitida
- Niveria
  - †Niveria quadripunctata
  - †Niveria suffusa
- Nodipecten
  - †Nodipecten nodosus
- †Nothokemas
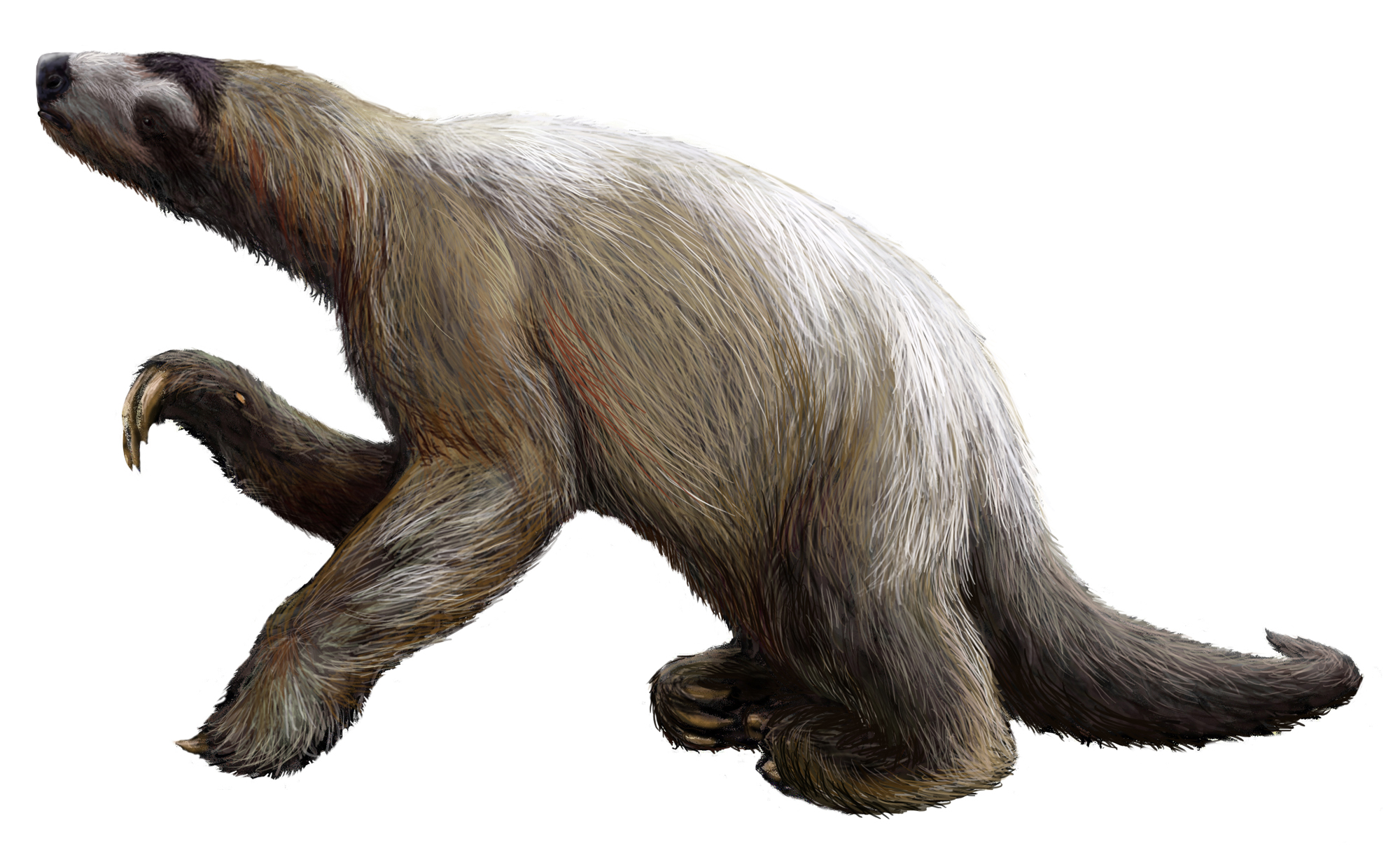
- Life restoration of the Pleistocene ground sloth Nothrotheriops
  †Nothrotheriops
- Notophthalmus
  - †Notophthalmus viridescens
- Notorynchus
- †Nototamias
- Nucula
  - †Nucula proxima
  - Nuculana acuta
- Numenius
  - †Numenius americanus
- Nummulites
- Nyctanassa
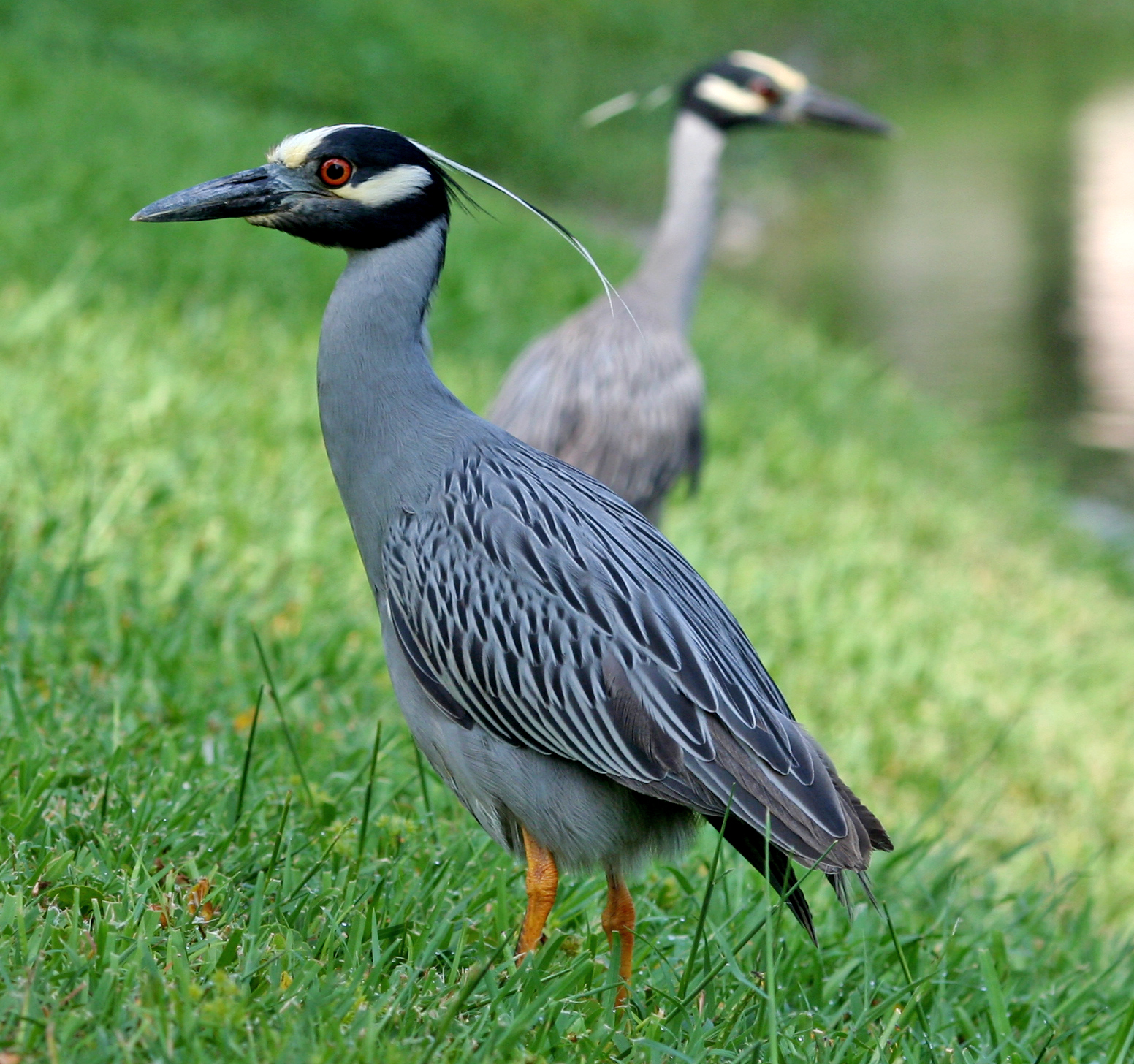
  - A living Nyctanassa violacea, or yellow-crowned night heron
    †Nyctanassa violacea – type locality for species
- Nycticeius
  - †Nycticeius humeralis
- Nycticorax
  - †Nycticorax nycticorax
- †Nyssa
- Ochrotomys
  - †Ochrotomys nuttalli
- Oculina
  - †Oculina diffusa
- Odocoileus
  - †Odocoileus virginianus
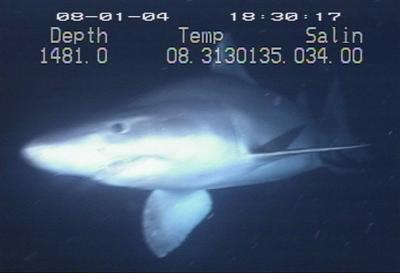
- A living Odontaspis sand shark
  Odontaspis
- Odostomia
  - †Odostomia acutidens
  - †Odostomia laevigata
- Olar
- †Oligobunis
- Oliva
  - †Oliva reticularis
  - Oliva sayana
- Olivella
  - †Olivella dealbata
  - †Olivella floralia
  - †Olivella mutica
  - †Olivella pusilla
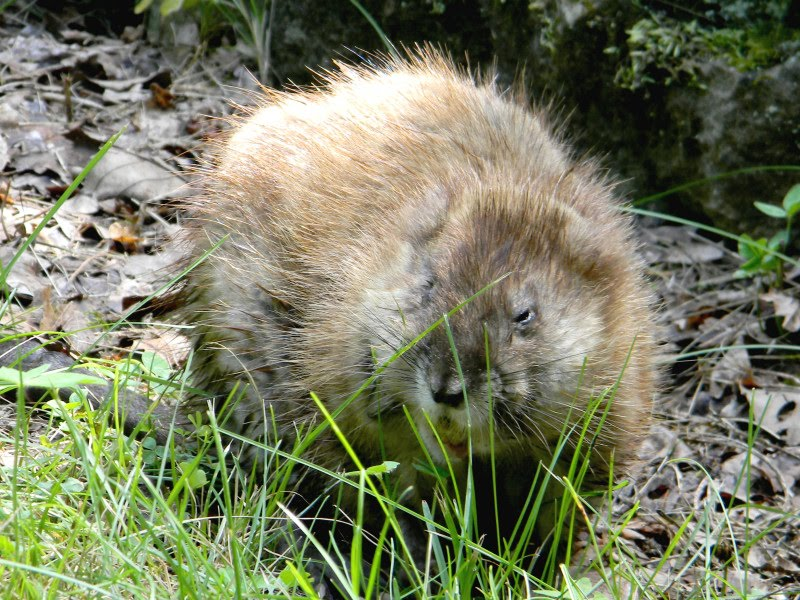
- A living Ondatra, or muskrat
  Ondatra
  - †Ondatra zibethicus
- Onoba
- †Ontocetus
  - †Ontocetus emmonsi
- Onustus
- Opalia
- Opheodrys
  - †Opheodrys aestivus
- Ophidion
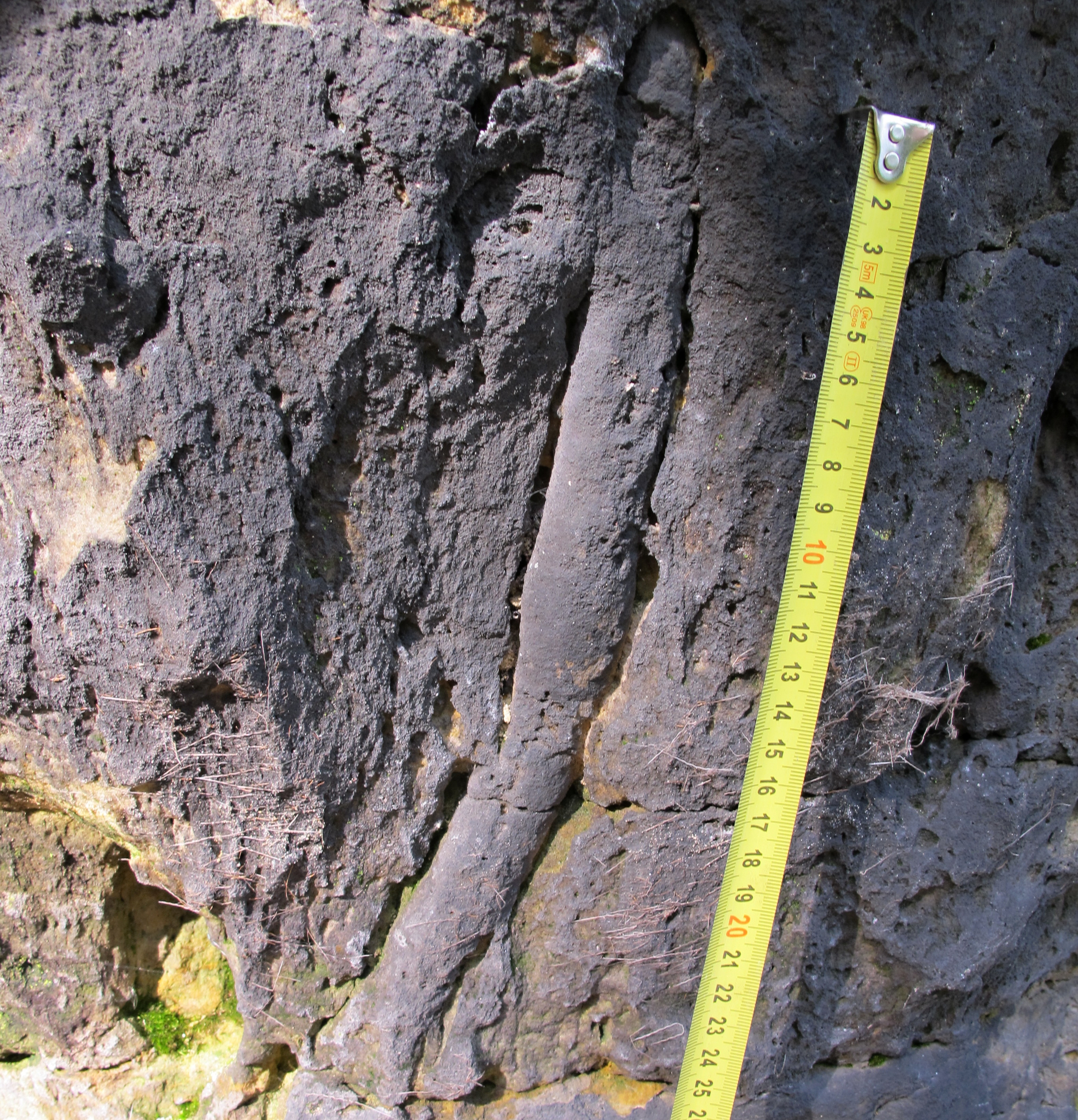
- Fossil of the Permian-modern crustacean burrow ichnogenus Ophiomorpha
  †Ophiomorpha
- Ophisaurus
  - †Ophisaurus compressus
  - †Ophisaurus ventralis
- †Opsanus
- Orbicella
  - †Orbicella annularis
- Orthogeomys
- Orthopristis
- Oryzomys
  - †Oryzomys palustris
- †Osbornodon
  - †Osbornodon iamonensis
- †Oscilla
- Ostrea
  - †Ostrea compressirostra
  - †Ostrea equestris
- †Otodus
  - Diagram illustrating the largest (grey) and most conservative (red) size estimates of the Miocene-Pliocene shark Carcharocles megalodon (sometimes Carcharodon or Otodus megalodon) with a whale shark (violet), great white shark (green), and anachronistic human (black) to scale
    †Otodus megalodon
- Otus
  - †Otus asio
- †Oxydactylus – tentative report
- †Oxyura
  - †Oxyura jamaicensis
- †Pachyarmatherium
  - †Pachyarmatherium leiseyi – type locality for species
- †Palaeogale
- †Palaeolama
- †Palaeophis
  - †Palaeophoyx columbiana – type locality for species
- †Pandanaris
- Pandion
  - †Pandion haliaetus
- Pandora
- Panopea
- Panthera
  - †Panthera atrox
  - †Panthera onca - locally extinct
- Papyridea
  - †Papyridea soleniformis
- †Parahippus
  - †Parahippus leonensis – type locality for species
- Parametaria
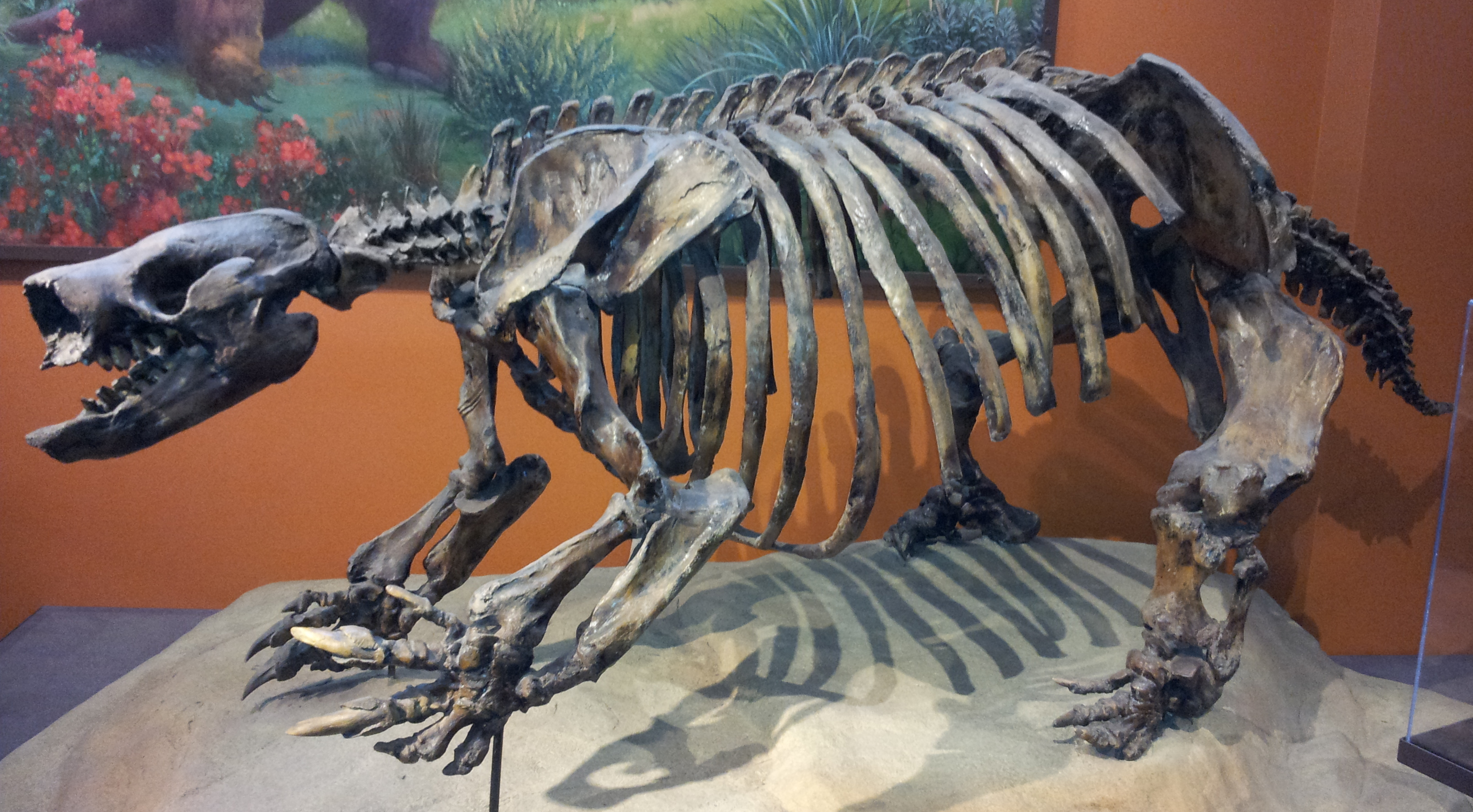
- Fossilized skeleton of the Pliocene-Pleistocene ground sloth Paramylodon
  †Paramylodon
  - †Paramylodon harlani
- Parastarte
  - †Parastarte triquetra
- †Parotodus
- Parvanachis
  - †Parvanachis obesa
- Parviturbo
- Passerculus
  - †Passerculus sandwichensis
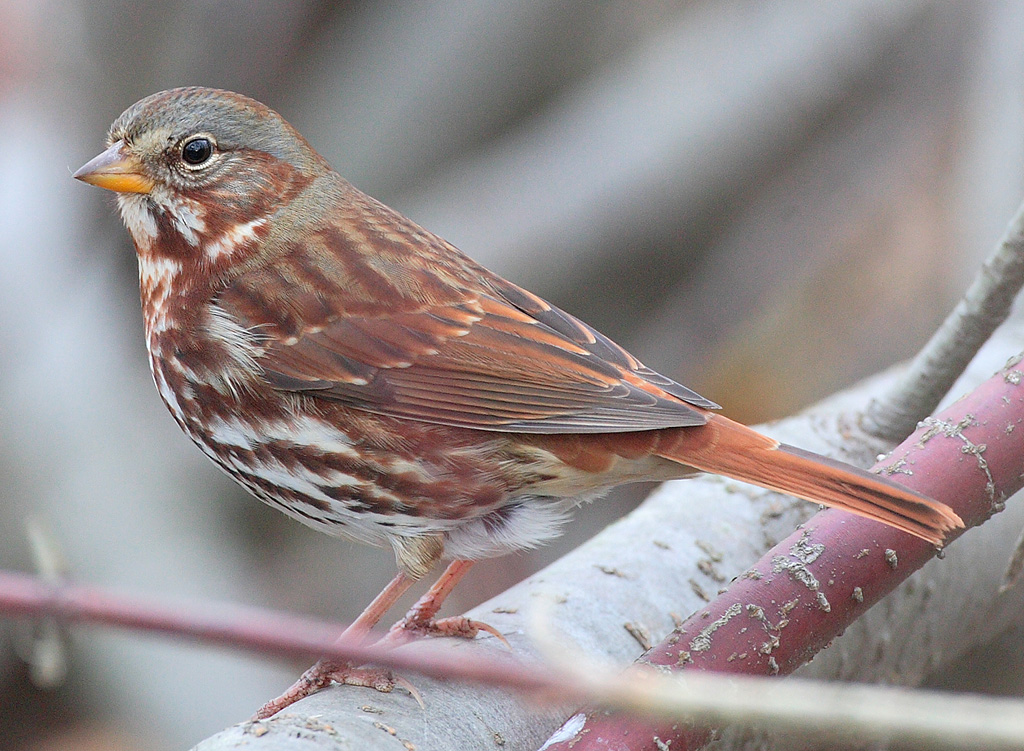
- A living Passerella iliaca, or fox sparrow
  Passerella – or unidentified comparable form
- Passerina – or unidentified comparable form
- Patelloida
  - †Patelloida pustulata
- Pecari
- Pecten
- †Pedalion
- †Pediomeryx
- Pelecanus
  - †Pelecanus erythrorhynchos – or unidentified comparable form
  - †Pelecanus schreiberi
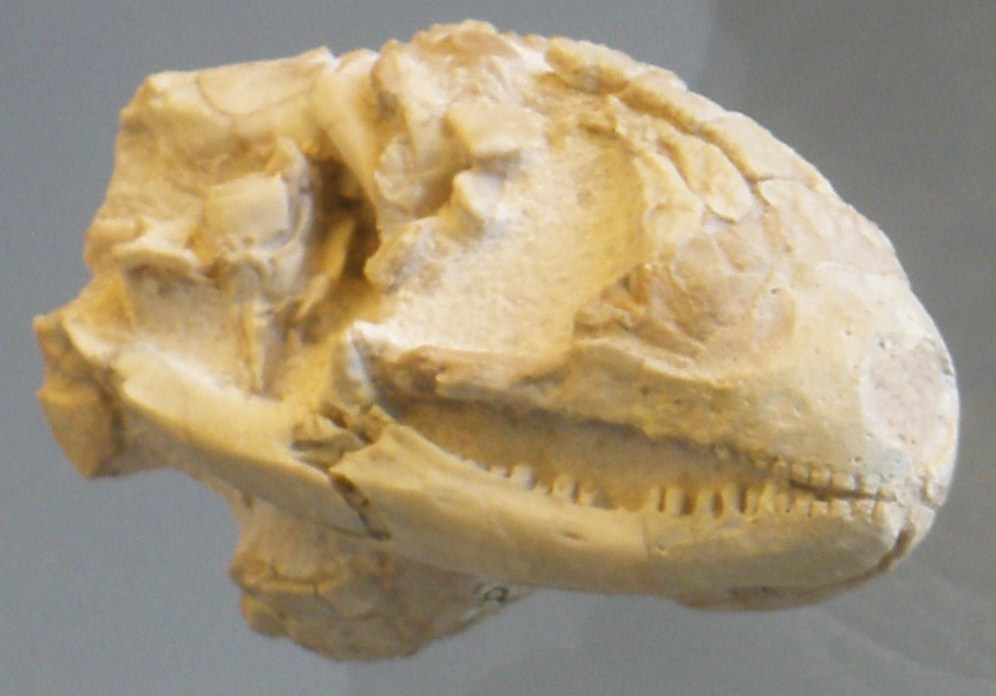
- Fossilized skull of the Eocene-Oligocene lizard Peltosaurus
  †Peltosaurus
- Peneroplis
- Periglypta
- Peristernia
- Perna
- Perognathus
- Peromyscus
  - †Peromyscus gossypinus
  - †Peromyscus polionotus
- Peronella
- †Perplicaria
- Persicula
- Persististrombus
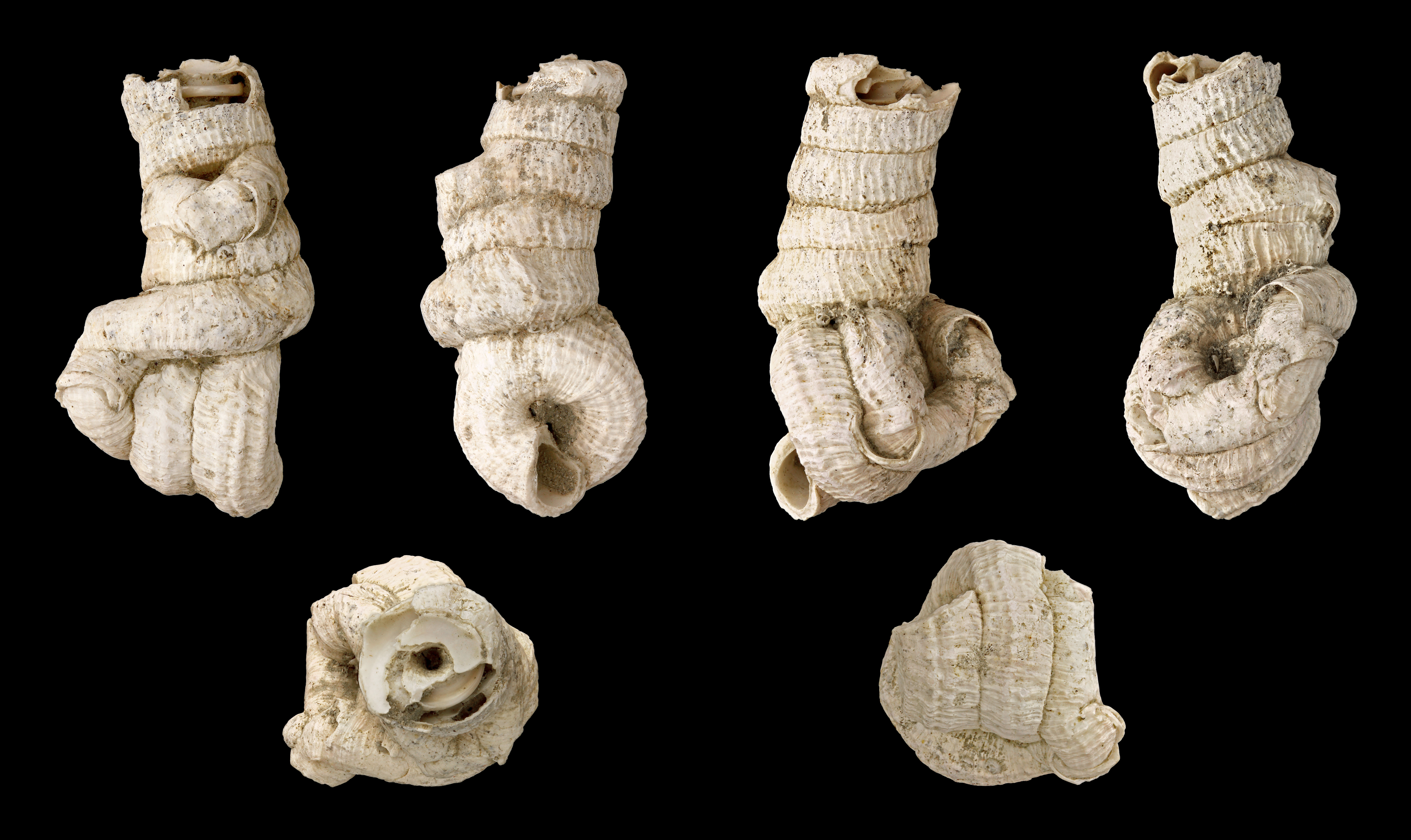
- Shell in multiple views of a Petaloconchus worm shell sea snail
  Petaloconchus
  - †Petaloconchus floridanus
  - †Petaloconchus varians
- Petricola
- †Petrolisthes
- Phalacrocorax
  - †Phalacrocorax auritus
- Phalium
- †Phlaocyon
  - †Phlaocyon achoros
- †Phoberocyon
- †Phocanella
- Phoenicopterus
  - †Phoenicopterus copei
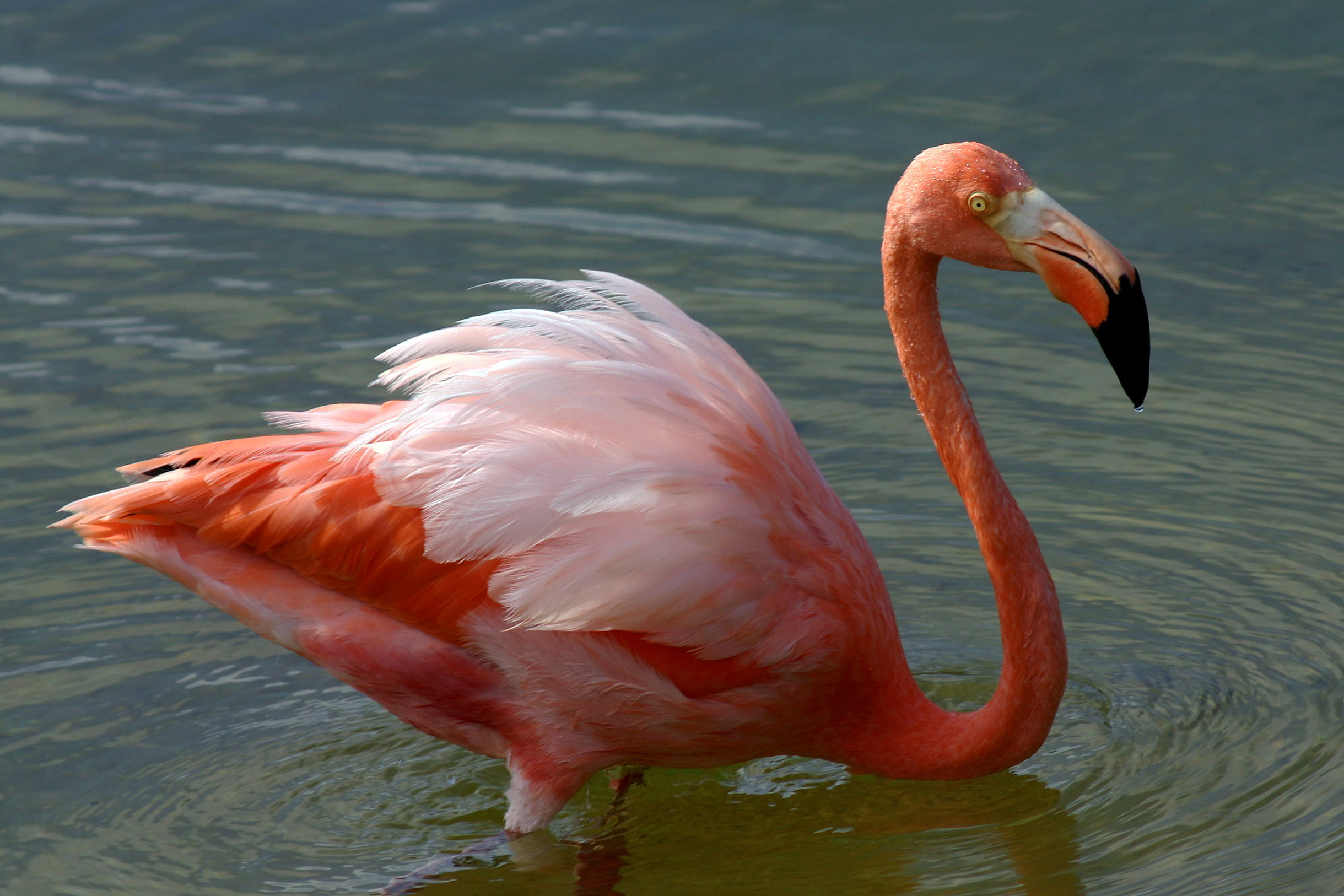
  - A living Phoenicopterus ruber, or American flamingo
    †Phoenicopterus ruber
- Pholadomya
- Phos
- Phrontis
  - †Phrontis vibex
- Phyllonotus
  - †Phyllonotus globosus
  - †Phyllonotus pomum
- Physa
- Physella
  - †Physella heterostropha
- †Physeterula
- †Physogaleus
  - †Physogaleus contortus
- Pica
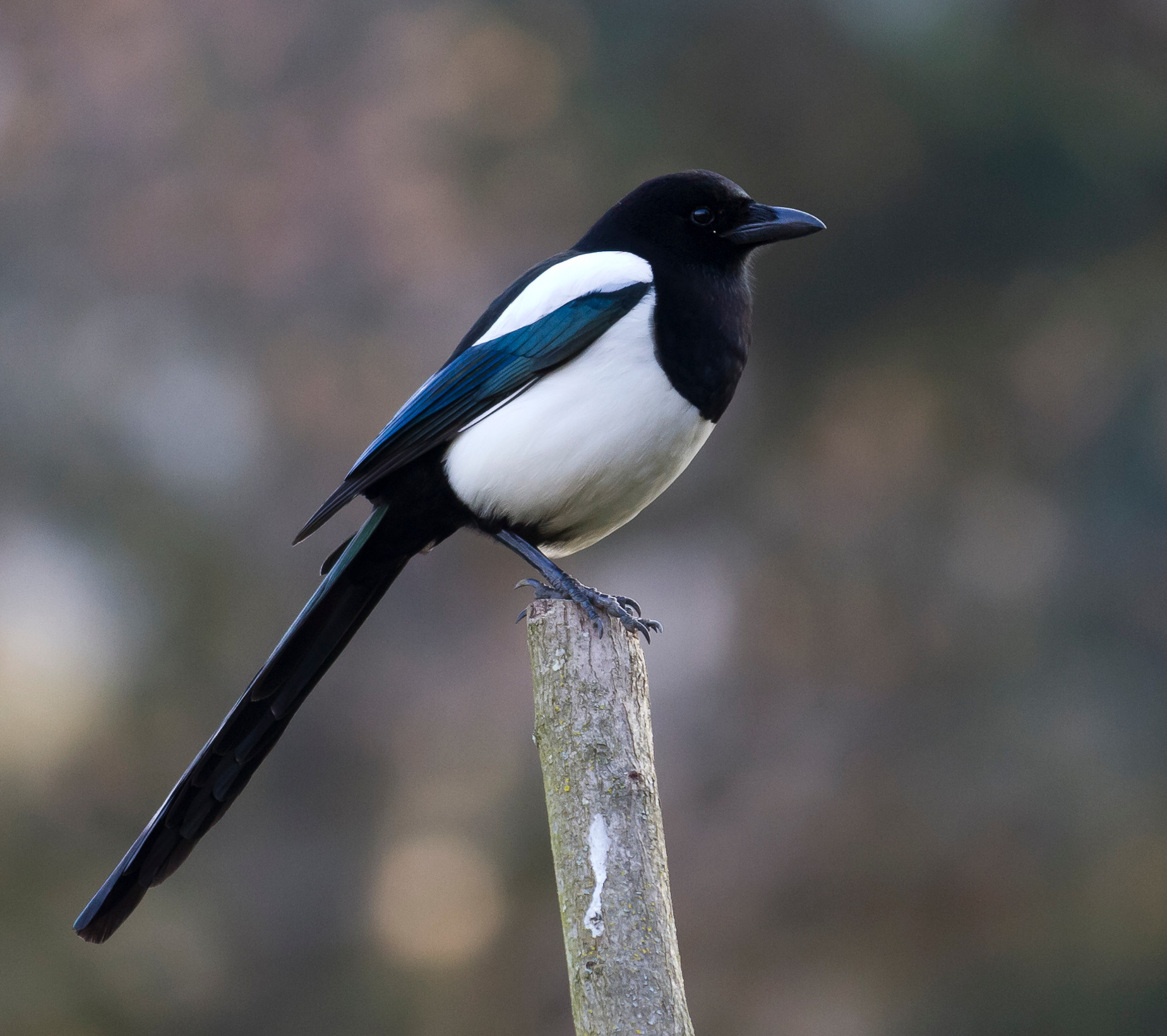
  - A living Pica pica Eurasian magpie
    †Pica pica
- Picoides
  - †Picoides villosus – or unidentified comparable form
- Pilsbryspira
  - †Pilsbryspira leucocyma
- Pinctada
- Pinna
- Pinus
  - †Pinus caribaea
  - †Pinus taeda
- Pipilo
  - †Pipilo erythrophthalmus
- Pipistrellus
  - †Pipistrellus subflavus
- Pisania
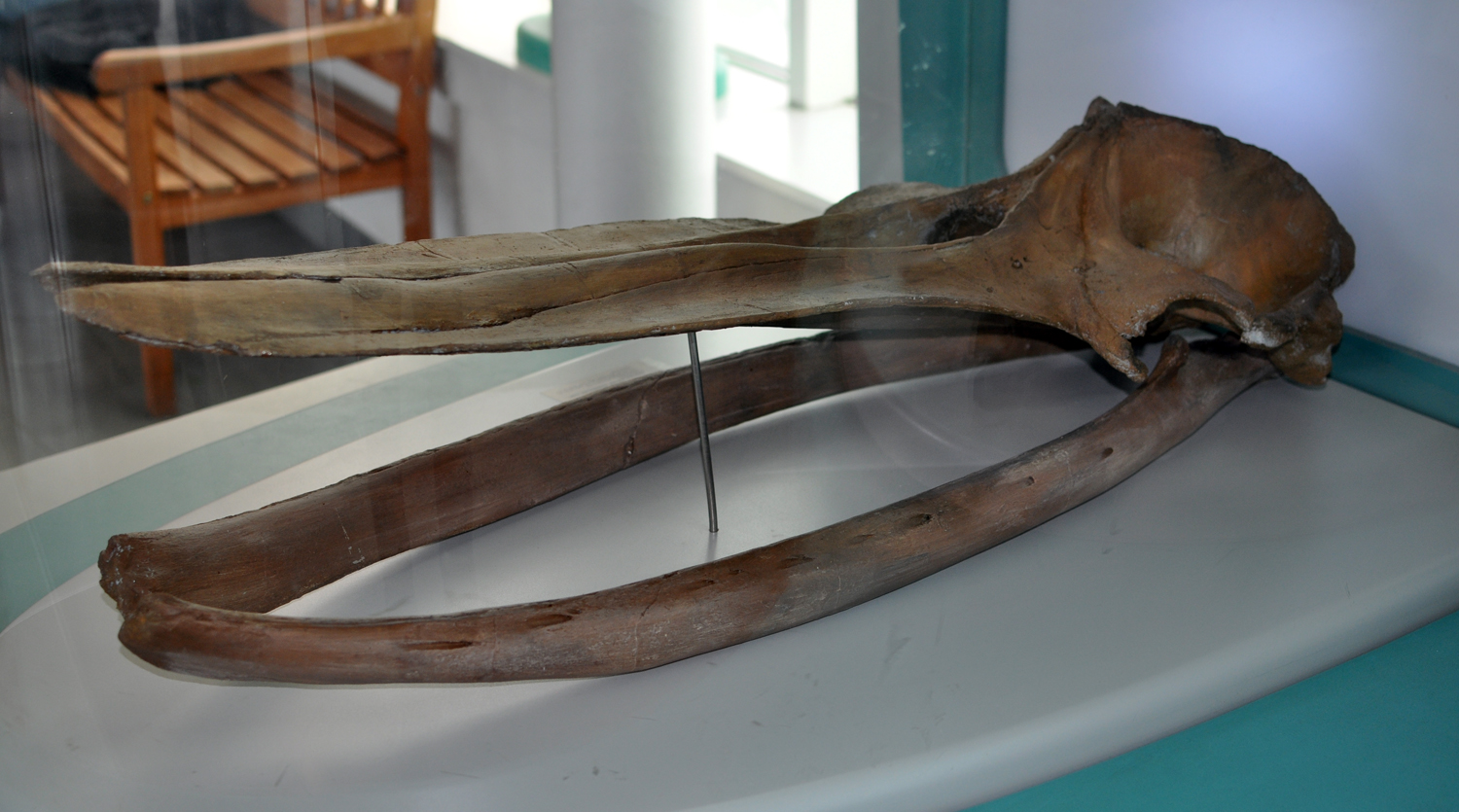
- Fossilized skull of the Miocene baleen whale Piscobalaena
  †Piscobalaena
- †Pistia
- Pitar
  - Pitar cordatus
  - †Pitar morrhuanus
- Pituophis
  - †Pituophis melanoleucus
- Pitymys
- †Planorbella
  - Planorbella duryi
- Planorbis
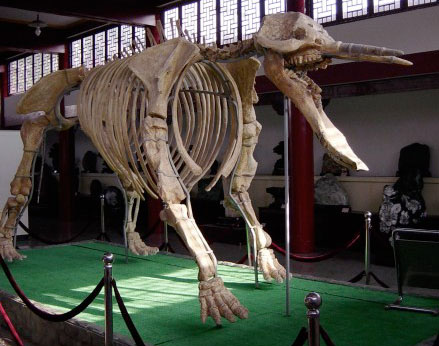
- Mounted fossilized skeleton of the Miocene elephant relative Platybelodon
  †Platybelodon
- †Platygonus
  - †Platygonus compressus
- †Platylepas
- Plecotus
  - †Plecotus rafinesquii
- Plegadis
- Plethodon
  - †Plethodon glutinosus
- †Pleurodonte
- Pleurofusia
  - †Pleurofusia dowlingi
- Pleuromeris
  - †Pleuromeris tridentata
- Pleuroploca
- Plicatula
  - †Plicatula gibbosa
- †Pliocyon
- †Pliohippus
- †Pliometanastes
- †Plionarctos
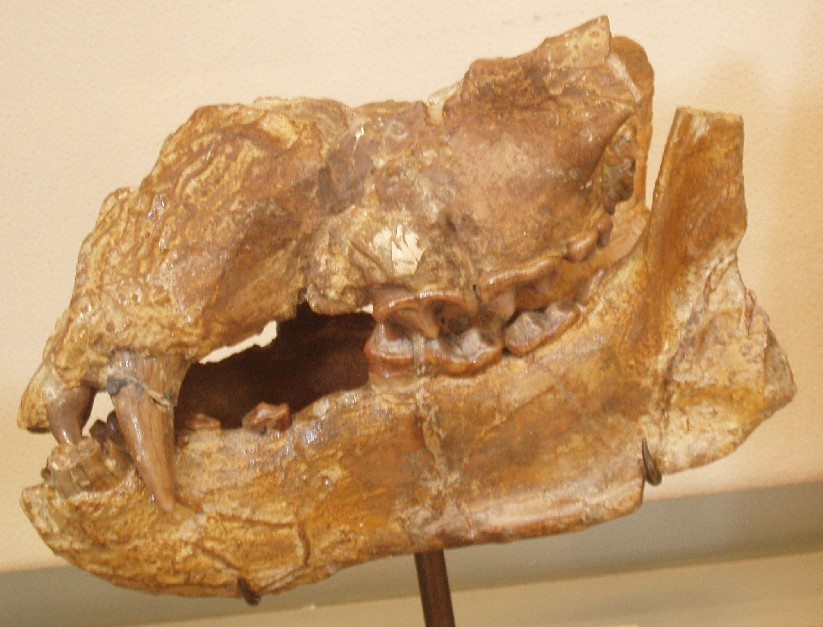
- Fossilized partial skull of the Miocene dog-like bear relative Plithocyon
  †Plithocyon – or unidentified comparable form
- Pocillopora
- Podiceps
  - †Podiceps auritus
- Podilymbus
  - †Podilymbus podiceps
- Podomys
  - Podomys floridanus
- †Poecilia
  - †Poecilia latipinna
- Pogonias
  - †Pogonias cromis
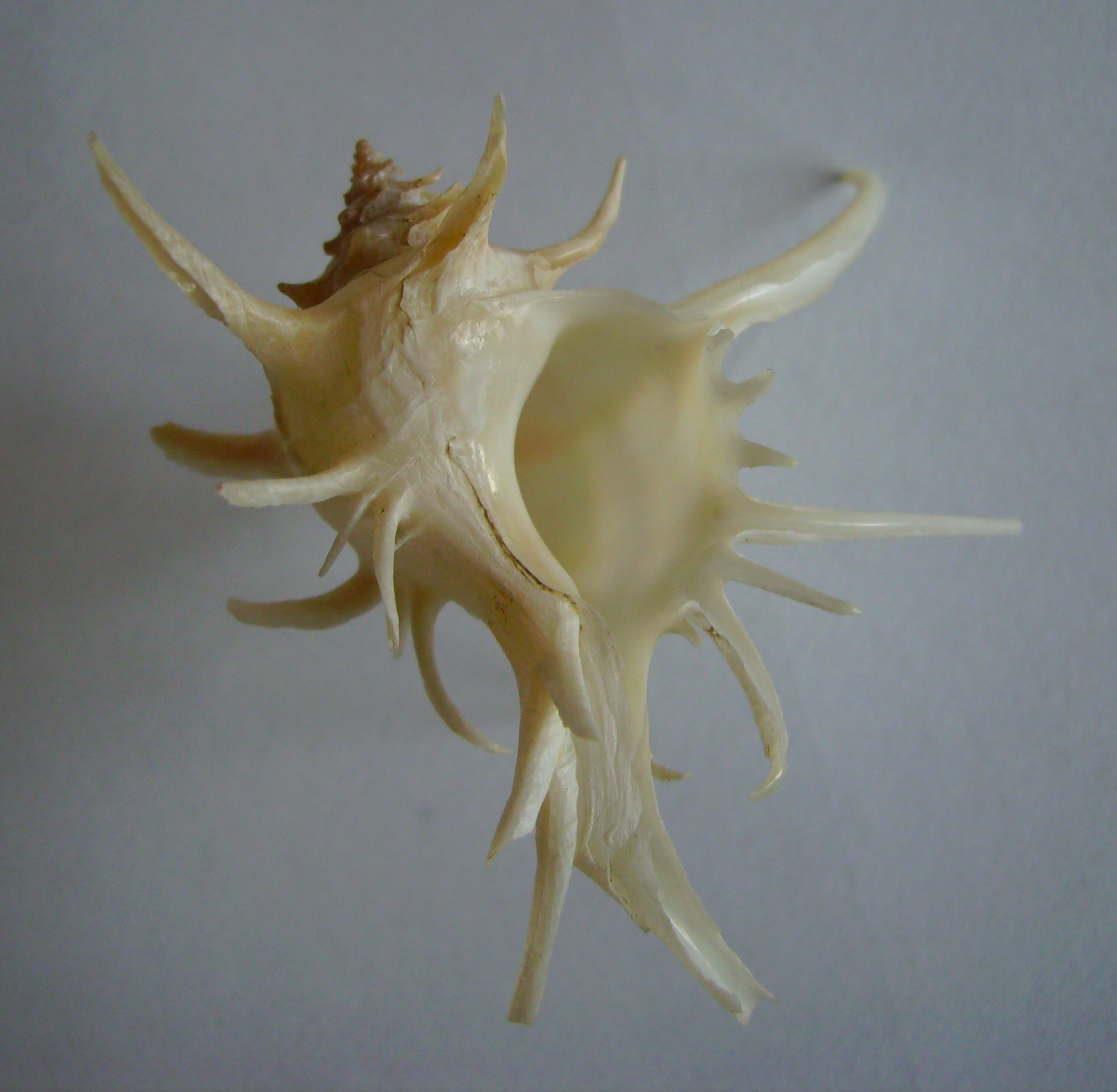
- Shell of a Poirieria murex snail
  Poirieria
- Polinices
  - †Polinices hepaticus
  - †Polinices lacteus
- Polygireulima
- Polygonum
- Polygyra
  - †Polygyra cereolus
  - †Polygyra septemvolva
- Polyschides
- Polystira
  - †Polystira albida
- Pomacea
  - †Pomacea paludosa
- Pomatodelphis
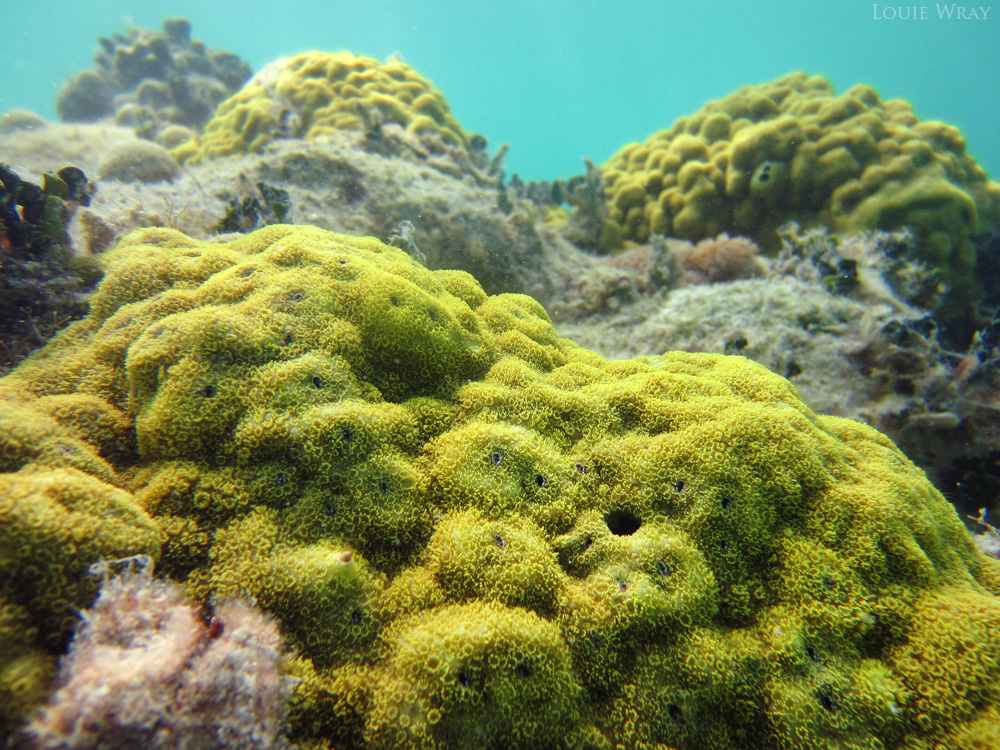
- Living Porites stony coral
  Porites
  - †Porites astreoides
  - †Porites furcata
  - †Porites porites
  - †Porphyrula martinica
- Portunus
- Porzana
  - †Porzana carolina
- †Potamides
- Prionotus
- Pristis
- †Procamelus
- †Procranioceras
- Procyon
  - †Procyon lotor – type locality for species
- †Prosynthetoceras
- †Protocardia
- †Protohippus
- †Protosiren
- Prunum
  - †Prunum amabile
  - †Prunum apicinum
  - †Prunum bellum
  - †Prunum guttatum
  - †Prunum roscidum
- Psammechinus
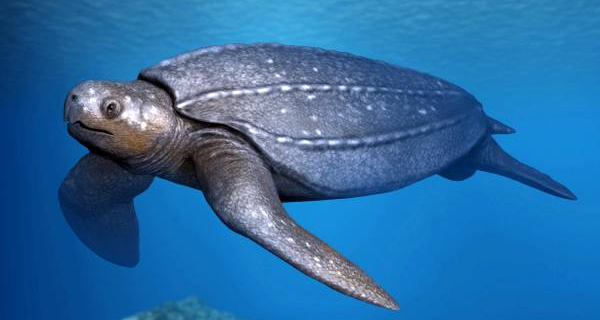
- Hypothetical restoration of the Oligocene-Pliocene sea turtle Psephophorus
  †Psephophorus
- Pseudacris
  - †Pseudacris ornata
- Pseudemys
  - †Pseudemys concinna
  - †Pseudemys floridana
  - †Pseudemys nelsoni
- †Pseudhipparion
- †Pseudobranchus
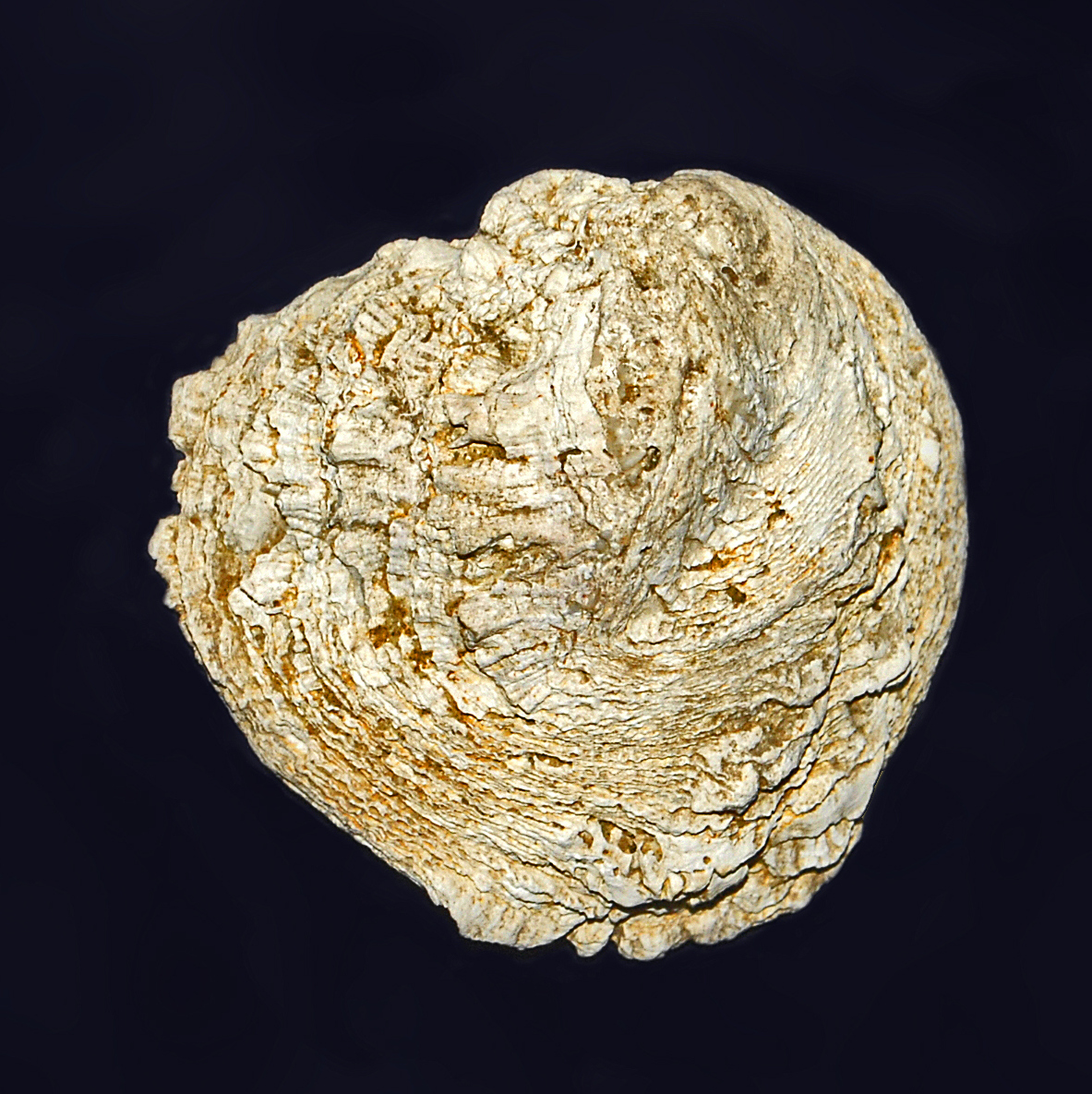
- Fossilized shell of the Eocene-modern jewelbox marine bivalve Pseudochama
  Pseudochama
- Pseudodiploria
- Pseudosuccinea
  - †Pseudosuccinea columella
- Pseudotorinia
- Pseudozonaria
- Psilaxis
- Pteria
  - †Pteria colymbus
- Pterocarya
- Pteromeris
  - †Pteromeris perplana
- Pteropurpura
- Pterorytis
- Pterotyphis
  - †Pterotyphis triangularis
- Pterynotus
  - †Pterynotus phyllopterus
  - †Pterynotus pinnatus
- †Ptychosalpinx
- Puffinus
  - †Puffinus puffinus
- Pugnus
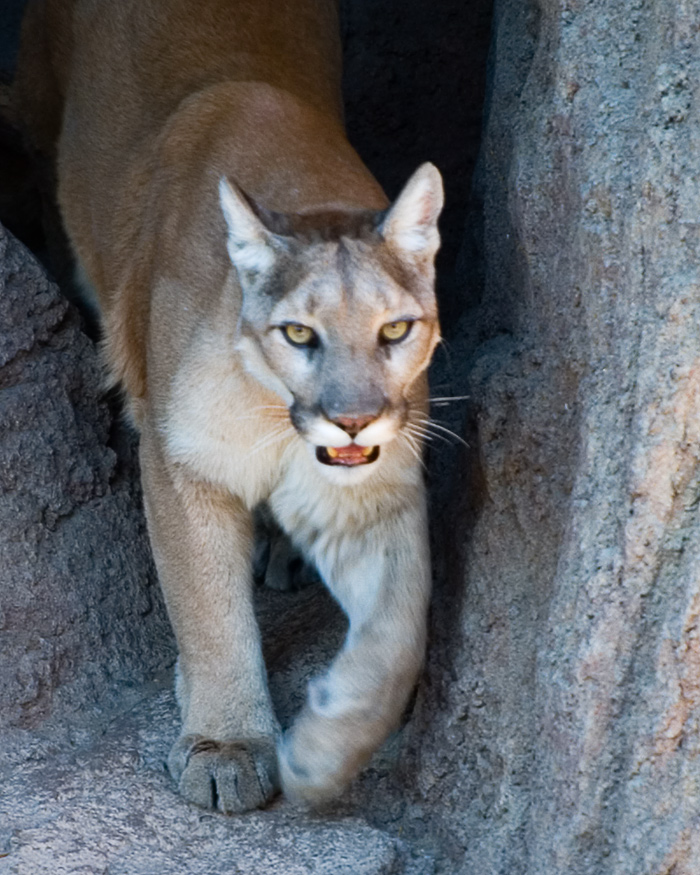
- A living Puma
  †Puma
  - †Puma concolor
- Pupoides
- Purpura
- Pusula
  - †Pusula pediculus
- Pycnodonte
- Pygmaepterys
- Pyramidella
- Pyrazus
- Pyrgocythara
  - †Pyrgocythara plicosa
- Pyrgospira
  - †Pyrgospira ostrearum
  - †Pyrgospira tampaensis
- †Pyruconus
- Quercus
  - †Quercus brevifolia
  - †Quercus laurifolia
  - †Quercus virginiana
- Querquedula
  - †Querquedula discors
- Quinqueloculina
- Quiscalus
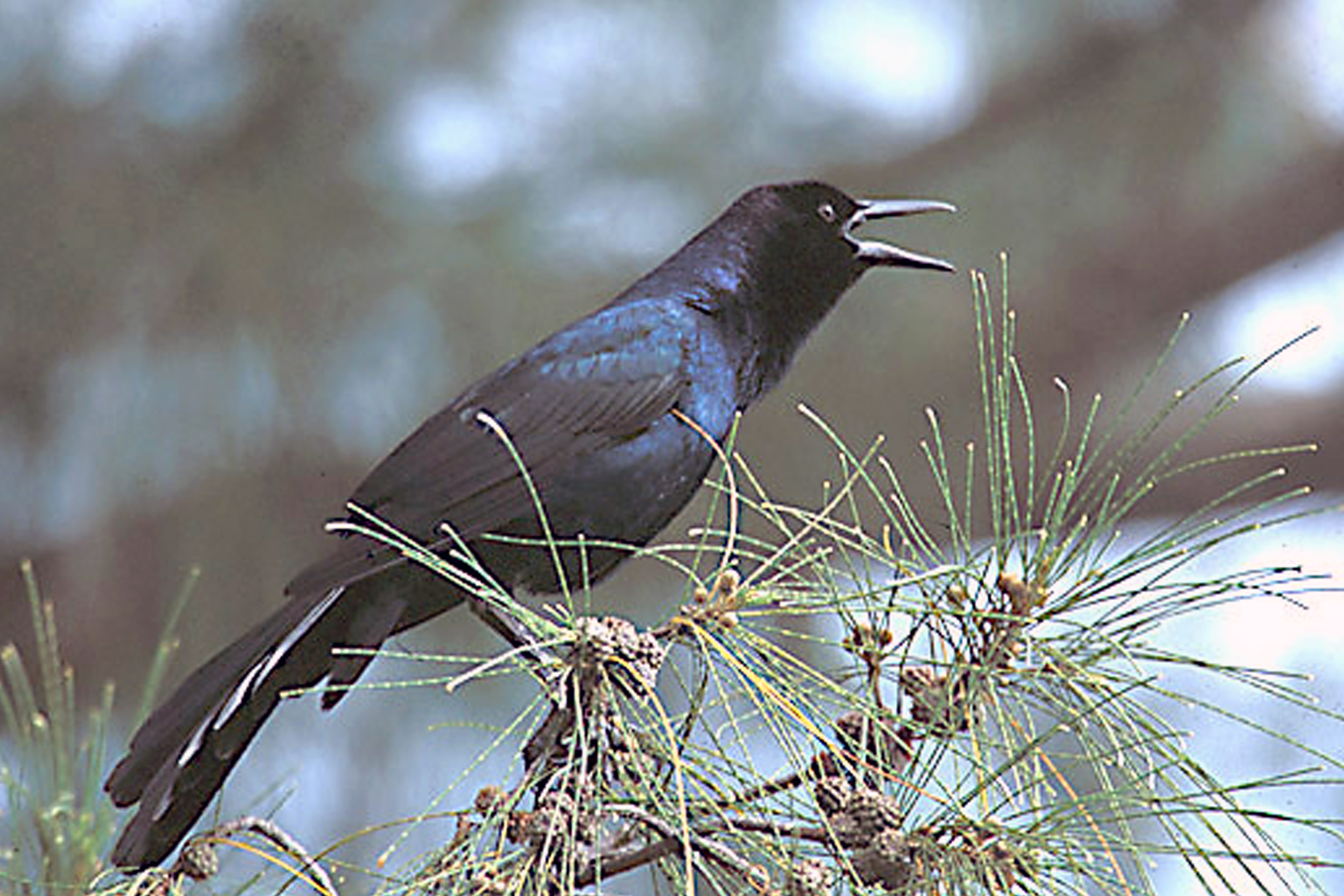
  - A living Quiscalus major, or boat-tailed grackle
    †Quiscalus major
  - †Quiscalus mexicanus
  - †Quiscalus quiscula
- Rallus
  - †Rallus elegans
  - †Rallus limicola
  - †Rallus longirostris
- †Rana
  - †Rana capito
  - †Rana catesbeiana
  - †Rana grylio
  - †Rana pipiens
- Rangia
- Rapana
- Recurvirostra
  - †Recurvirostra americana
- †Regina – or unidentified comparable form
  - †Regina alleni
- Reithrodontomys
  - †Reithrodontomys humulis
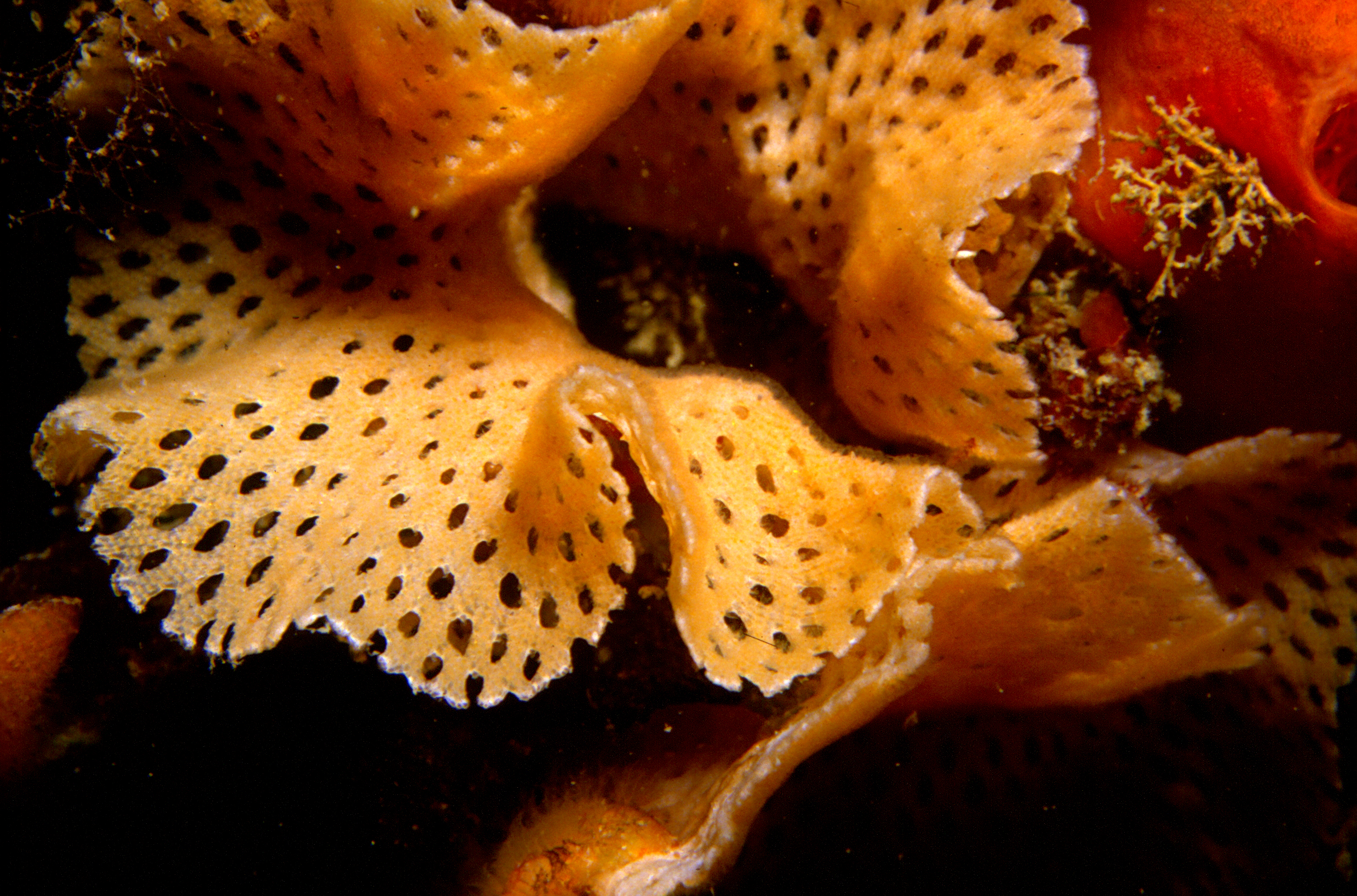
- Living Reteporella bryozoan ("moss animal")
  Reteporella
- Retilaskeya
  - †Retilaskeya bicolor
- Retusa – tentative report
- Rhadinaea
  - †Rhadinaea flavilata
- †Rhegminornis
- Rhineura
  - †Rhineura floridana
- Rhinoclavis
- Rhinoptera
  - †Rhinoptera bonasus
- Rhizoprionodon
  - †Rhizoprionodon terraenovae
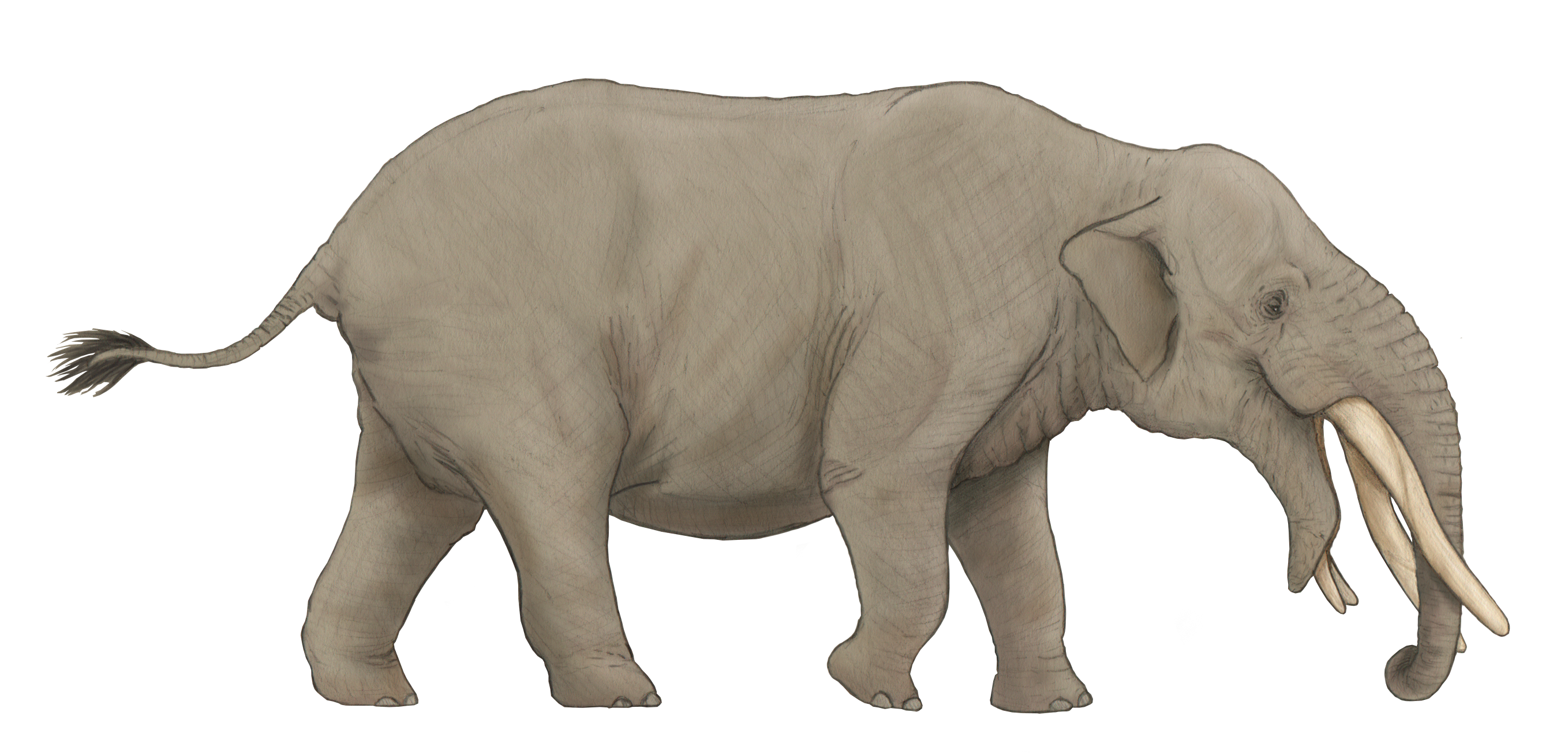
- Restoration of the Miocene-Pliocene elephant relative Rhynchotherium
  †Rhynchotherium
- Rictaxis
- Rimella
- Rimula
- Ringicula
- Rissoa
- Rissoina
  - †Rissoina floridana
  - †Rissoina sagraiana
  - †Rissoina striatocostata
- Rostellaria
- †Rotalia
- Ruppia – or unidentified related form
- Sabal
  - †Sabal palmetto
- †Saccharoturris
  - †Saccharoturris centrodes – type locality for species
- Sardinella
- Sassia
- †Satherium
  - †Satherium piscinarium
- †Scala
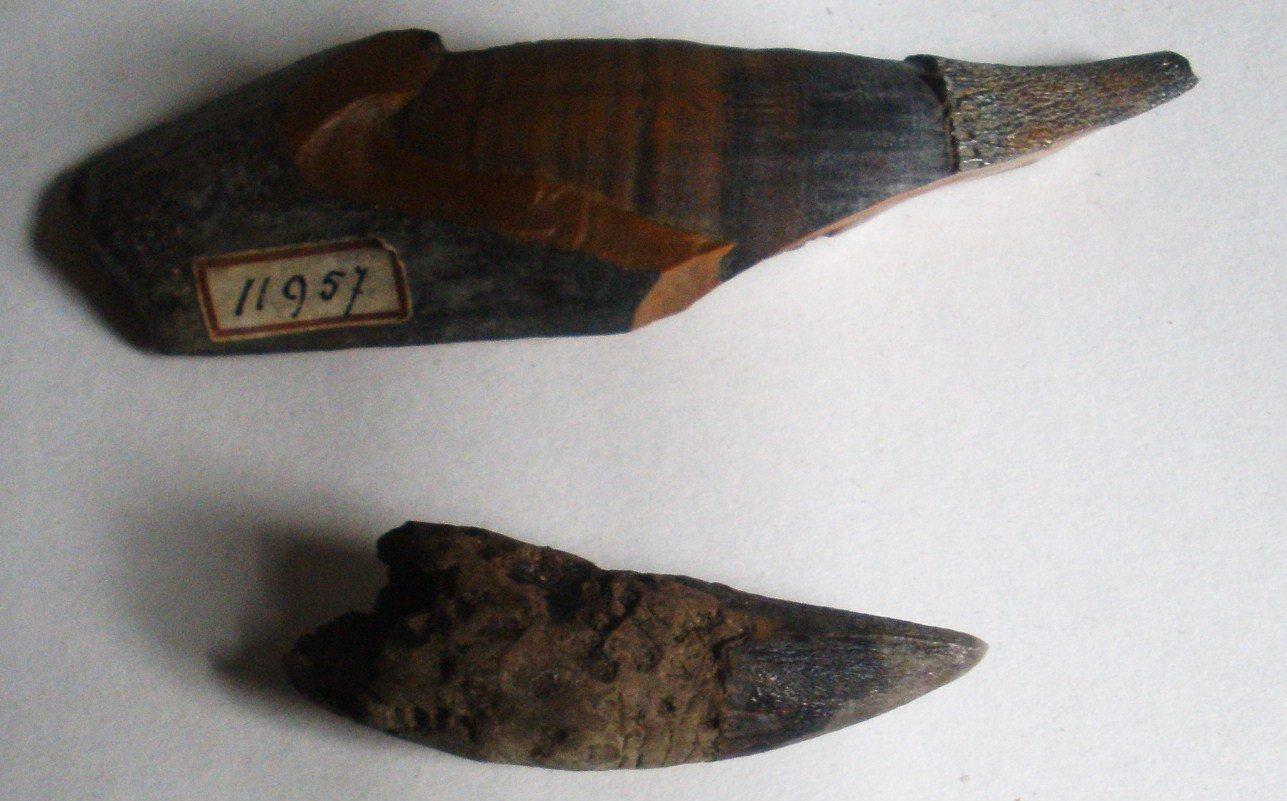
- Fossilized teeth of the Neogene sperm whale Scaldicetus
  †Scaldicetus
- Scalopus
  - †Scalopus aquaticus
- Scaphander
- Scapharca
- Scaphella
  - Scaphella junonia
- Scaphiopus
  - †Scaphiopus holbrooki
  - †Scaphiopus holbrookii
- Schizaster
- Schizoporella
- †Sciadopitys
- Sciurus
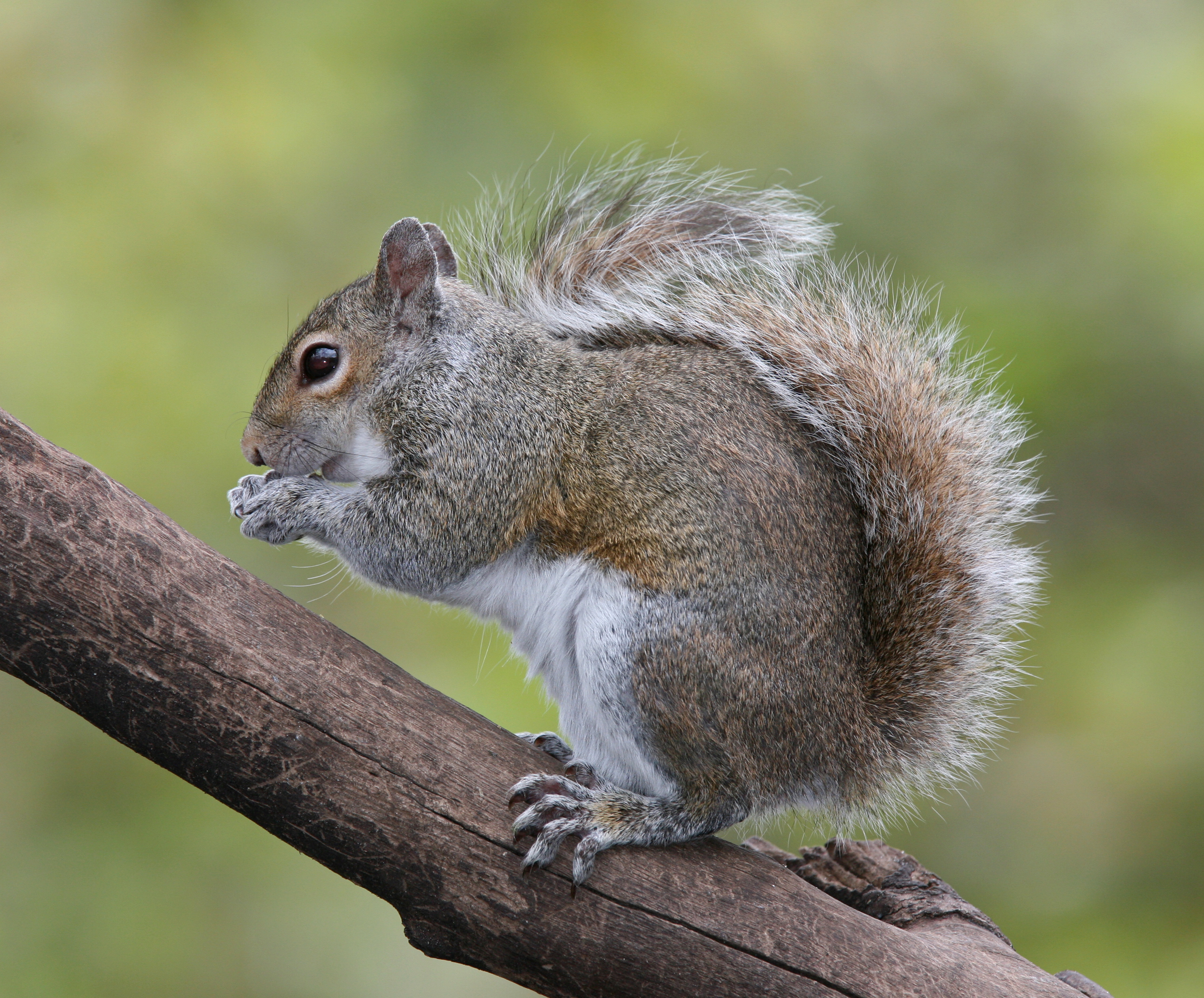
  - A living Sciurus carolinensis, or eastern gray squirrel
    †Sciurus carolinensis
  - †Sciurus niger
- Scolopax
  - †Scolopax minor
- Scolymia
  - †Scolymia lacera
- Sconsia
- †Scutella
- Sedilia
  - †Sedilia aphanitoma
- Seila
  - †Seila adamsii
- Semele
- Semicassis
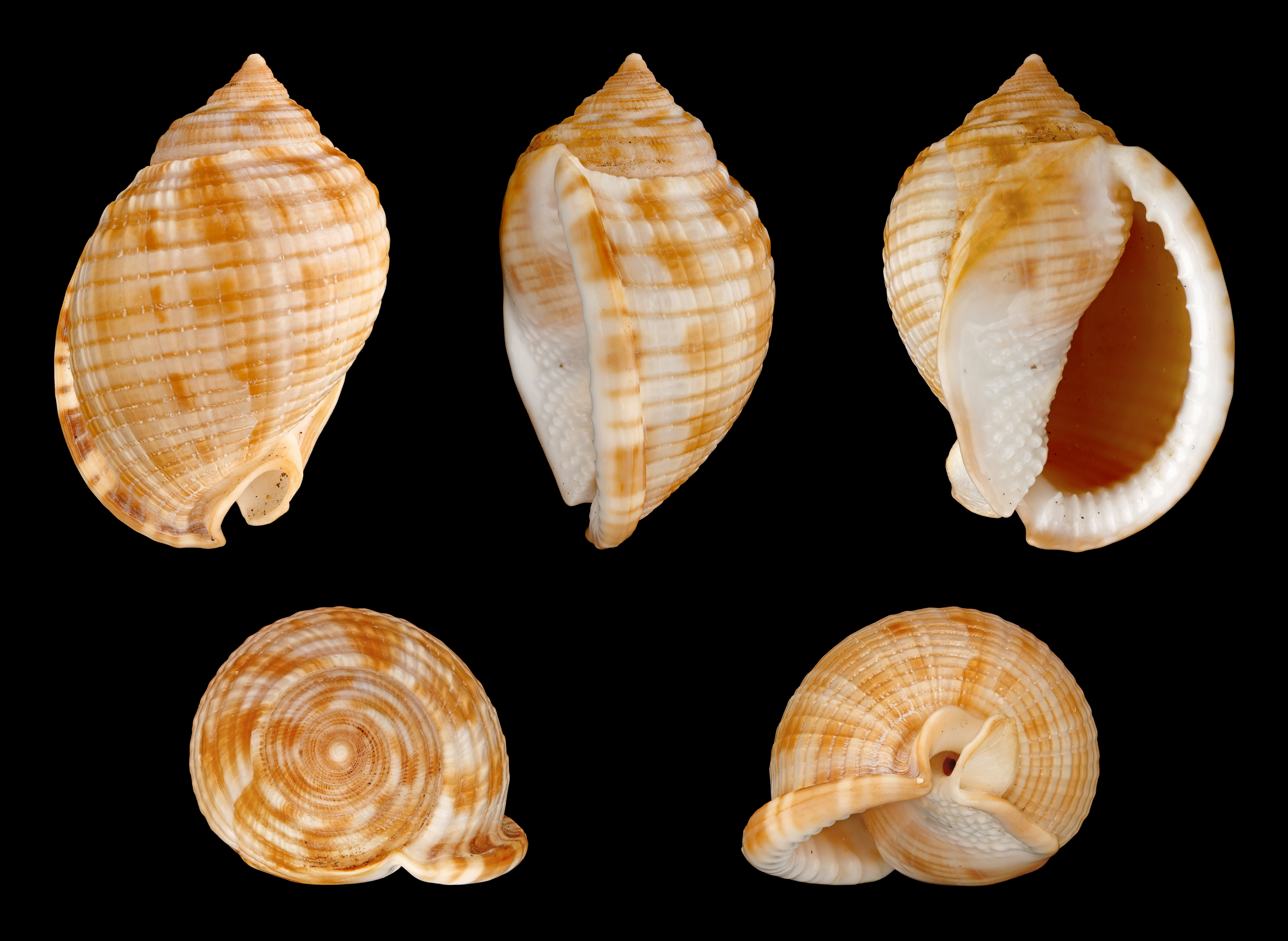
  - Shell in multiple views of a Semicassis granulata, or Scotch bonnet sea snail
    †Semicassis granulata
- †Seminoleconus
- †Seraphs
- †Serenoa
  - †Serenoa serrulata
- Serpula
- Serpulorbis
  - †Serpulorbis decussatus
- Siderastrea
  - †Siderastrea radians
  - †Siderastrea siderea
- Sigatica
  - †Sigatica semisulcata
- Sigmodon
  - †Sigmodon hispidus
- Simnia
- Simnialena
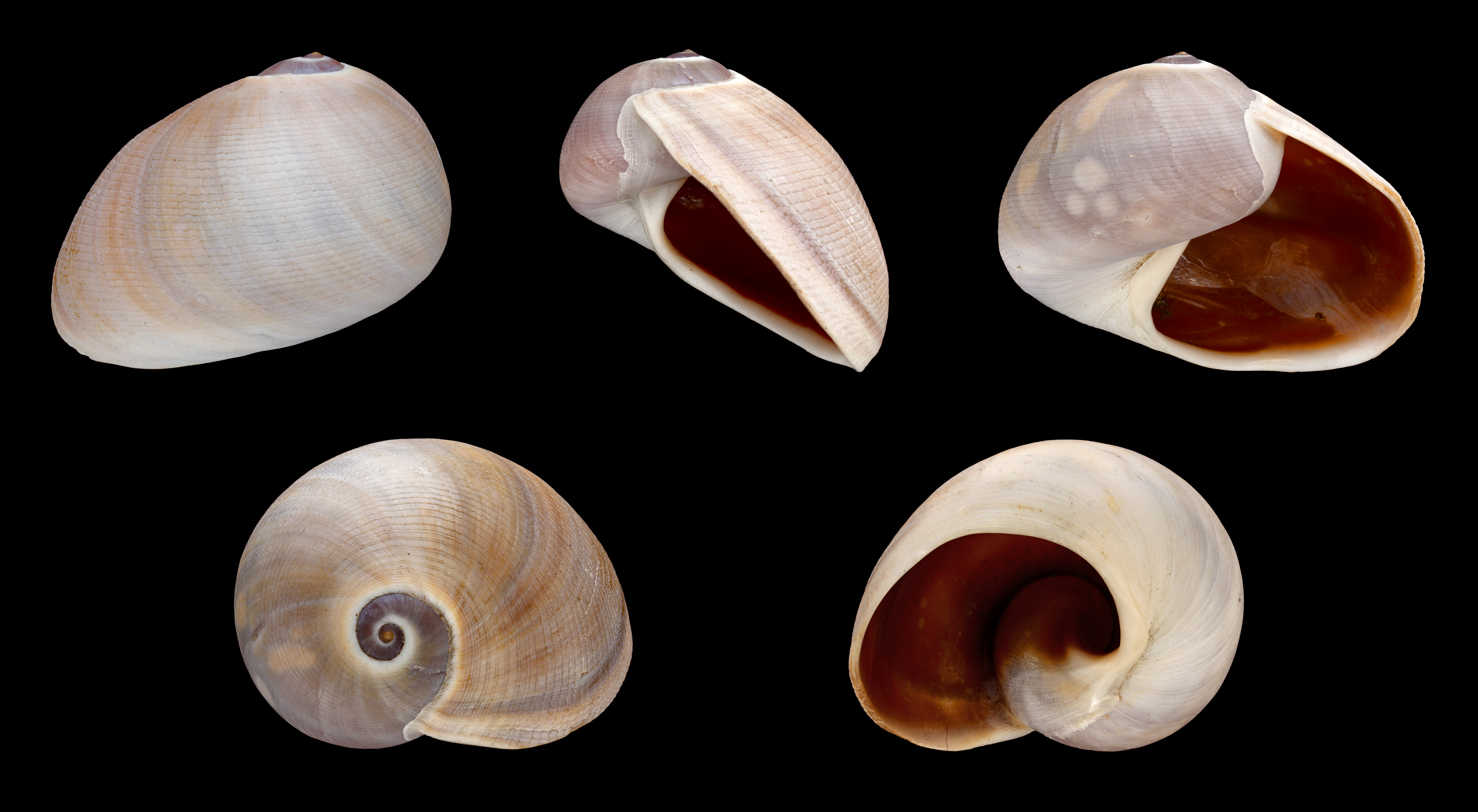
- Several views of the shell of a Sinum moon snail
  Sinum
  - †Sinum perspectivum
- Siphonochelus
- †Siren
  - †Siren hesterna – type locality for species
  - †Siren lacertina
  - †Siren simpsoni – type locality for species
- Sistrurus
  - †Sistrurus miliarius
- Smaragdia
  - †Smaragdia viridis
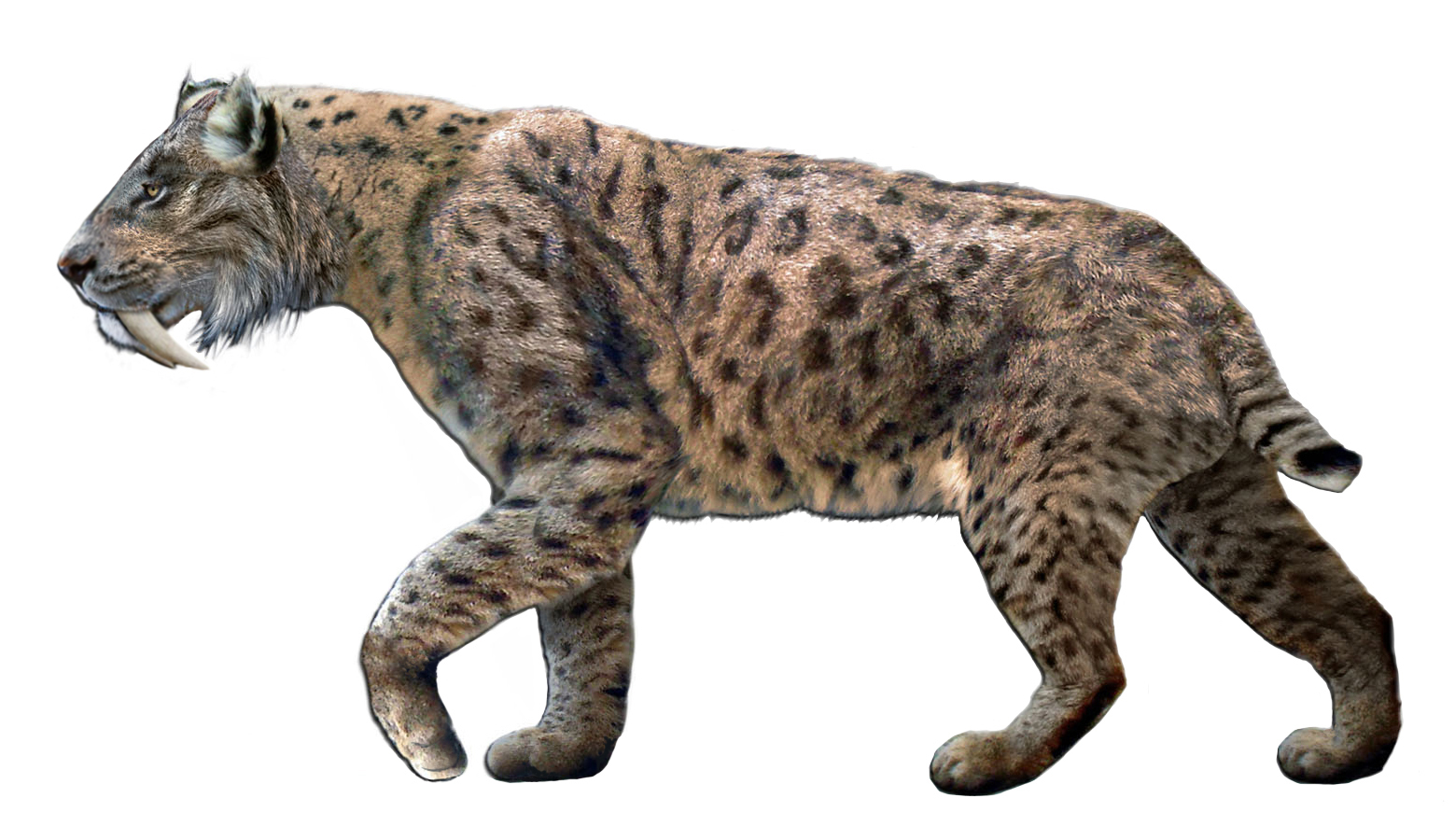
- Life restoration of the Pleistocene-Holocene saber-tooth cat Smilodon
  †Smilodon
  - †Smilodon fatalis
  - †Smilodon gracilis
- Solariella
- Solecurtus
- Solen
- Solenosteira
  - †Solenosteira cancellaria
- Somateria
  - †Somateria spectabilis – or unidentified comparable form
- Sorex
  - †Sorex longirostris
- Sorites
- Spatula
- Spermophilus
- Sphyraena
  - †Sphyraena barracuda
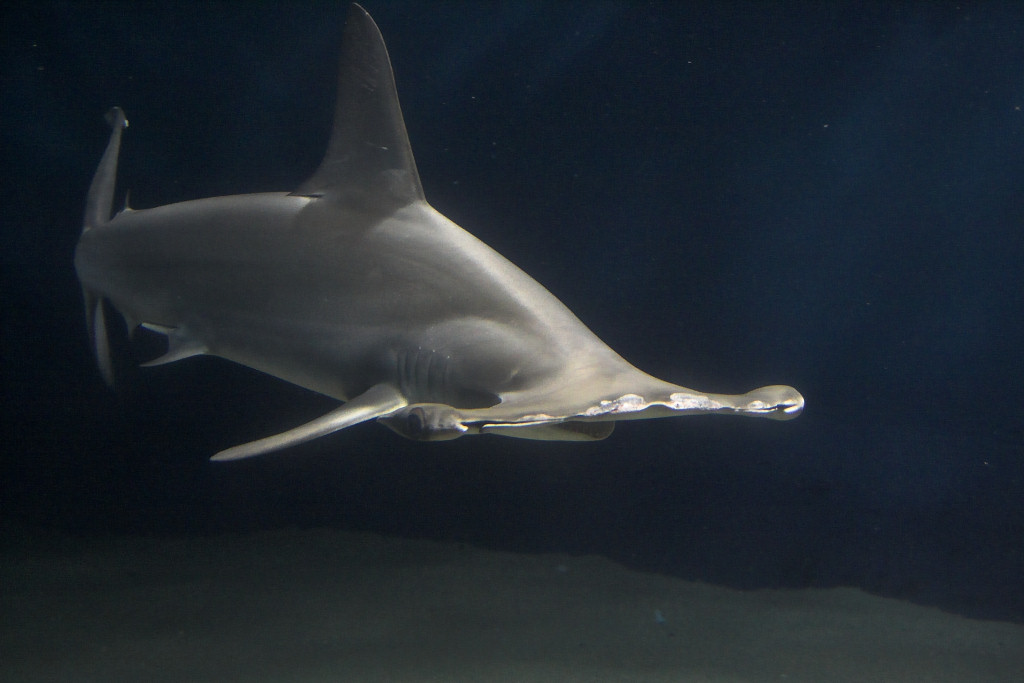
- A living Sphyrna hammerhead shark
  Sphyrna
- Spilogale
  - †Spilogale putorius
- †Spiraxis – tentative report
- Spirorbis
- Spisula
- Spizaetus
- Spizella
  - †Spizella passerina
  - †Spizella pusilla
- Splendrillia
- Spondylus
  - Spondylus americanus
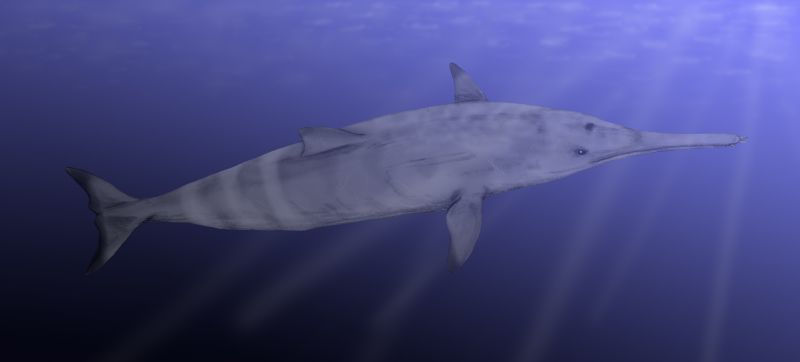
- Life restoration of the Oligocene-Miocene shark-toothed dolphin Squalodon
  †Squalodon – tentative report
- †Stellifer
- Stercorarius
- Sternotherus
- Stewartia
  - †Stewartia floridana
- Sthenictis
- Stigmaulax
- Stilosoma
- Storeria
  - †Storeria dekayi
- Stramonita
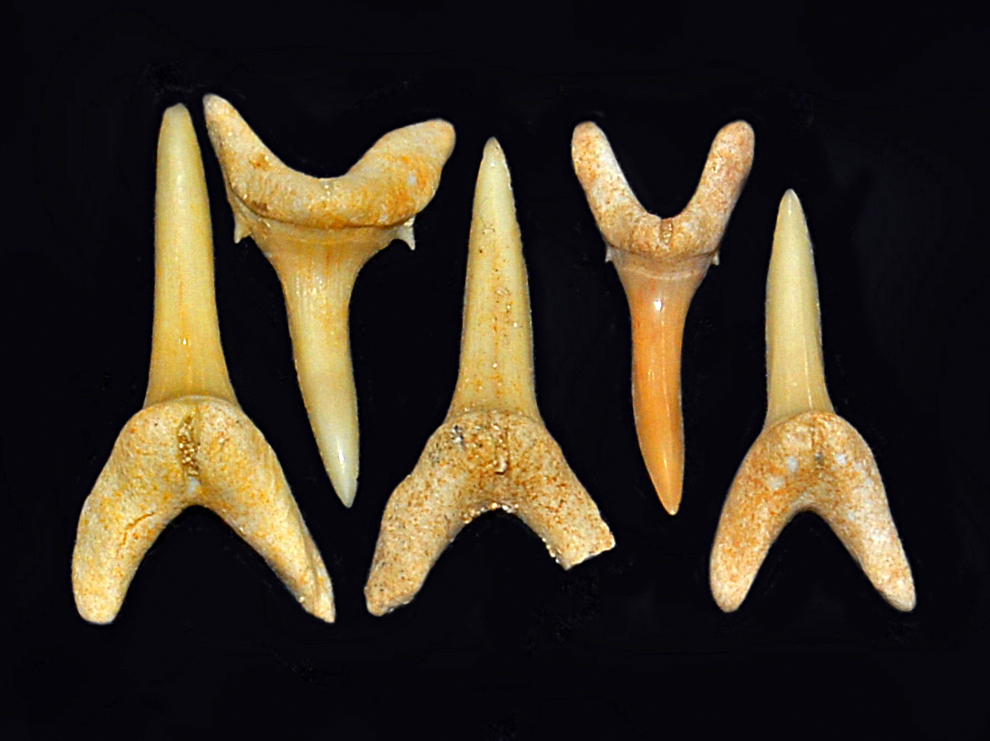
- Fossilized teeth of the Paleocene-Miocene sandshark Striatolamia
  †Striatolamia
- Strioterebrum
- Strix
  - †Strix varia
- Strobilops
- Strombiformis
- Strombina
- Strombus
  - †Strombus alatus
  - †Strombus pugilis
  - †Strombus raninus
- Sturnella
  - †Sturnella magna
- Stylophora
- Subcancilla
- Sula
- †Syllomus – or unidentified comparable form
- Sylvilagus
  - †Sylvilagus floridanus
  - †Sylvilagus palustris
- Synaptomys
- Synodus
  - †Synodus foetens – or unidentified comparable form
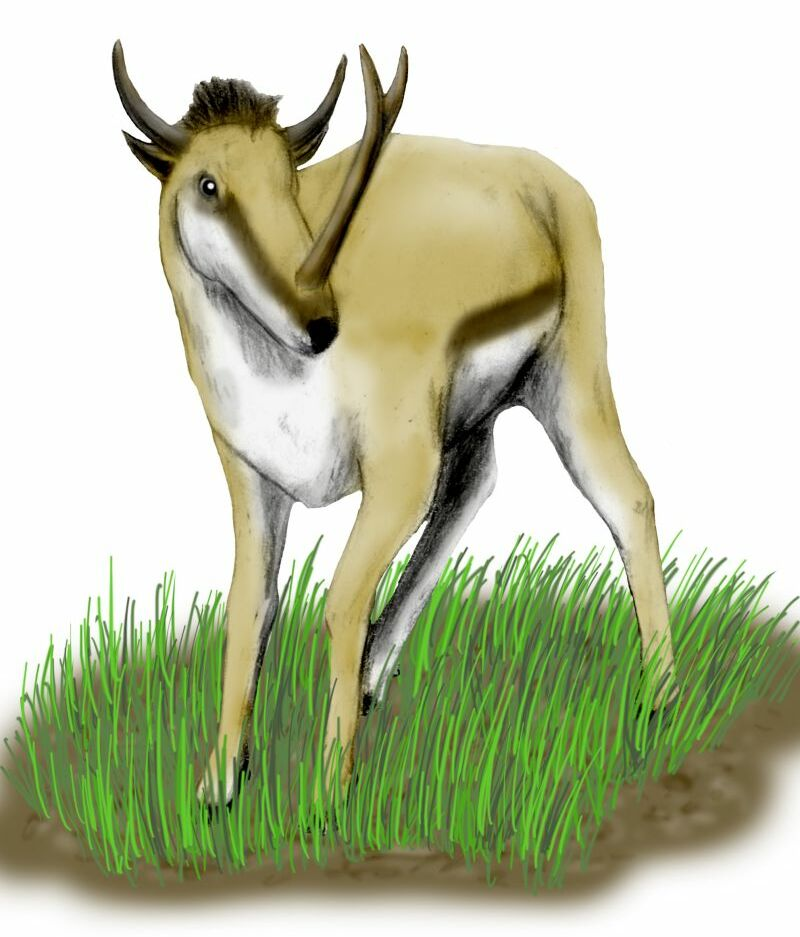
- Life restoration of the Miocene even-toed ungulate Synthetoceras
  †Synthetoceras
  - †Synthetoceras tricornatus – or unidentified comparable form
- Syntomodrillia
- Syrnola
- Tachybaptus
  - †Tachybaptus dominicus
- Tachycineta
- Tadarida
  - †Tadarida brasiliensis
- Tagelus
- Talparia
- Tamias
  - †Tamias aristus
- Tantilla
  - †Tantilla coronata
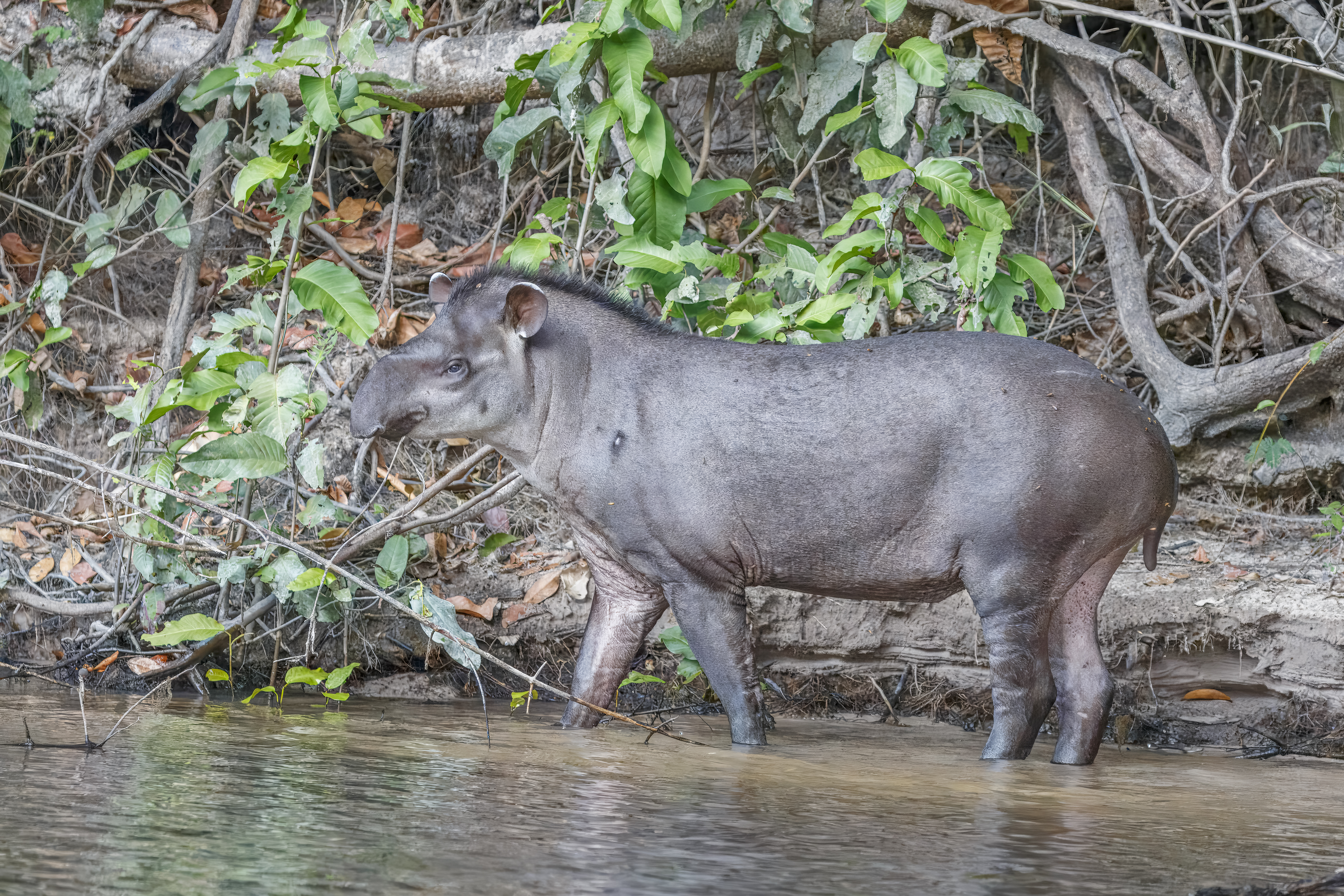
- A living Tapirus, or tapir
  Tapirus
  - †Tapirus lundeliusi – type locality for species
  - †Tapirus polkensis
  - †Tapirus veroensis
  - †Tapirus webbi – type locality for species
- Taras
- Taxodium
  - Taxodium distichum
- Tectonatica
  - †Tectonatica pusilla
- Tegula
  - †Tegula fasciata
- Teinostoma
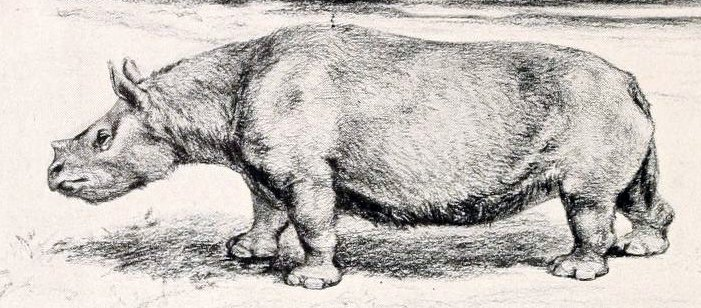
- Restoration of the Miocene-Pliocene rhinoceros Teleoceras
  †Teleoceras
  - †Teleoceras proterum
- Telescopium
- Tellina
- Tenagodus
- †Tephrocyon
- †Teratornis
  - †Teratornis merriami
- Terebellum
- Terebra
  - †Terebra dislocata
  - †Terebra protexta
- Teredo
- Terrapene
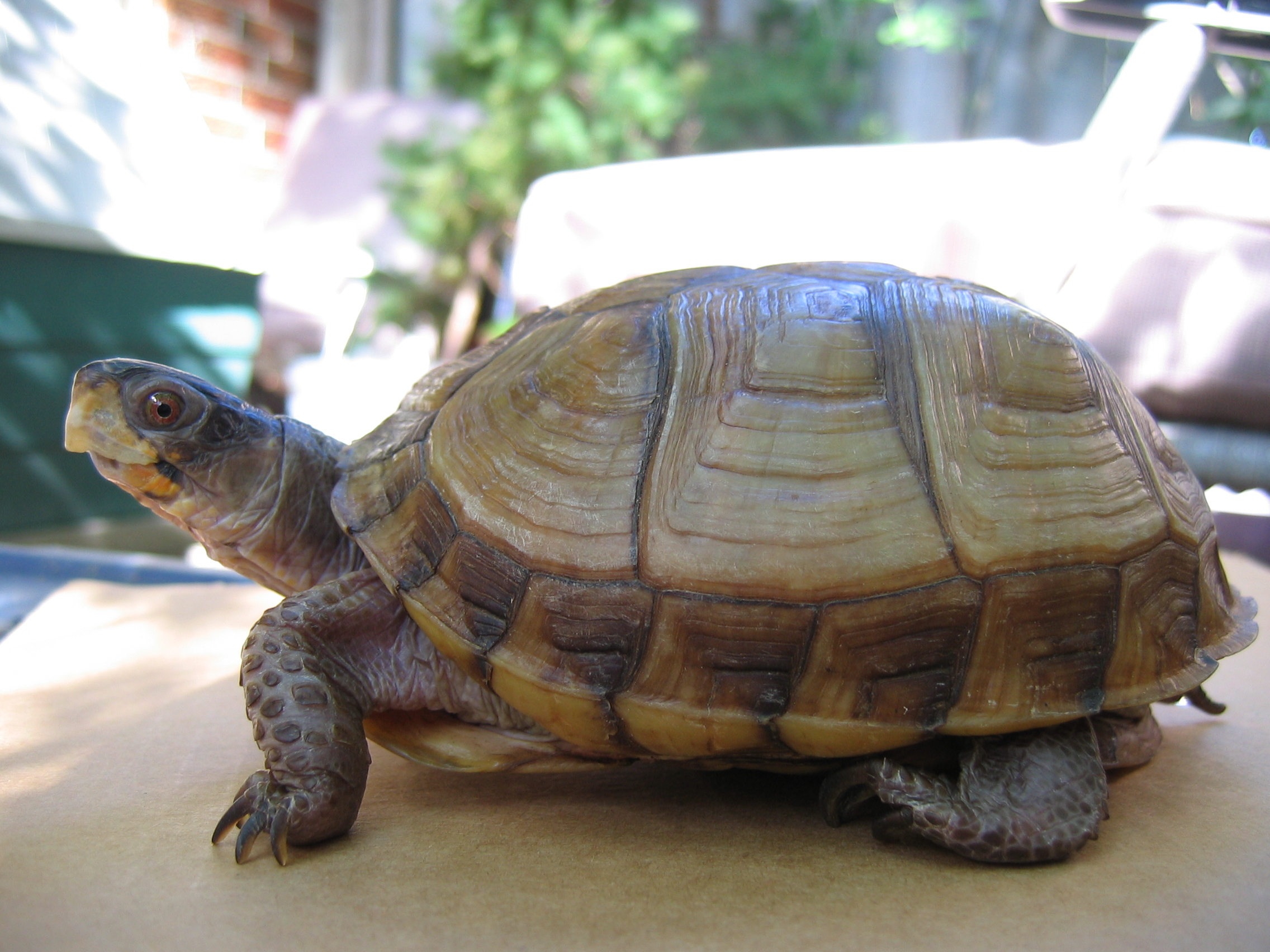
  - A living Terrapene carolina, or common box turtle
    †Terrapene carolina
- Testudo
- Textularia
- Thalassia
  - †Thalassia testudinum
- Thalassodendron
- Thamnophis
  - †Thamnophis sirtalis
- †Thelecythara
  - †Thelecythara floridana
- †Theriodictis
- †Thinobadistes
- Thomomys
- Thracia
- Thyasira
  - †Thyasira trisinuata
- †Ticholeptus
- Timoclea
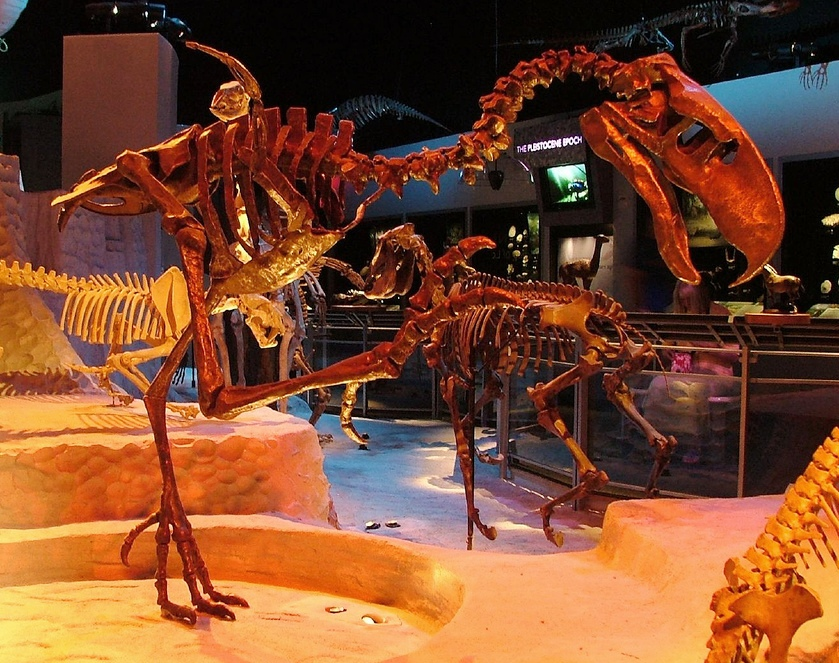
- Mounted fossilized skeleton of the Pliocene-Pleistocene terror bird Titanis
  †Titanis – type locality for genus
  - †Titanis walleri – type locality for species
- Tocobaga
- Tonna
  - †Tonna galea
- Totanus
- Toxostoma
  - †Toxostoma rufum
- Trachemys
  - †Trachemys scripta
- Trachycardium
  - †Trachycardium egmontianum
  - †Trachycardium isocardia
  - †Trachycardium muricatum
- Trachyphyllia
- Trachypollia
- Tremarctos
  - †Tremarctos floridanus
- Trichechus
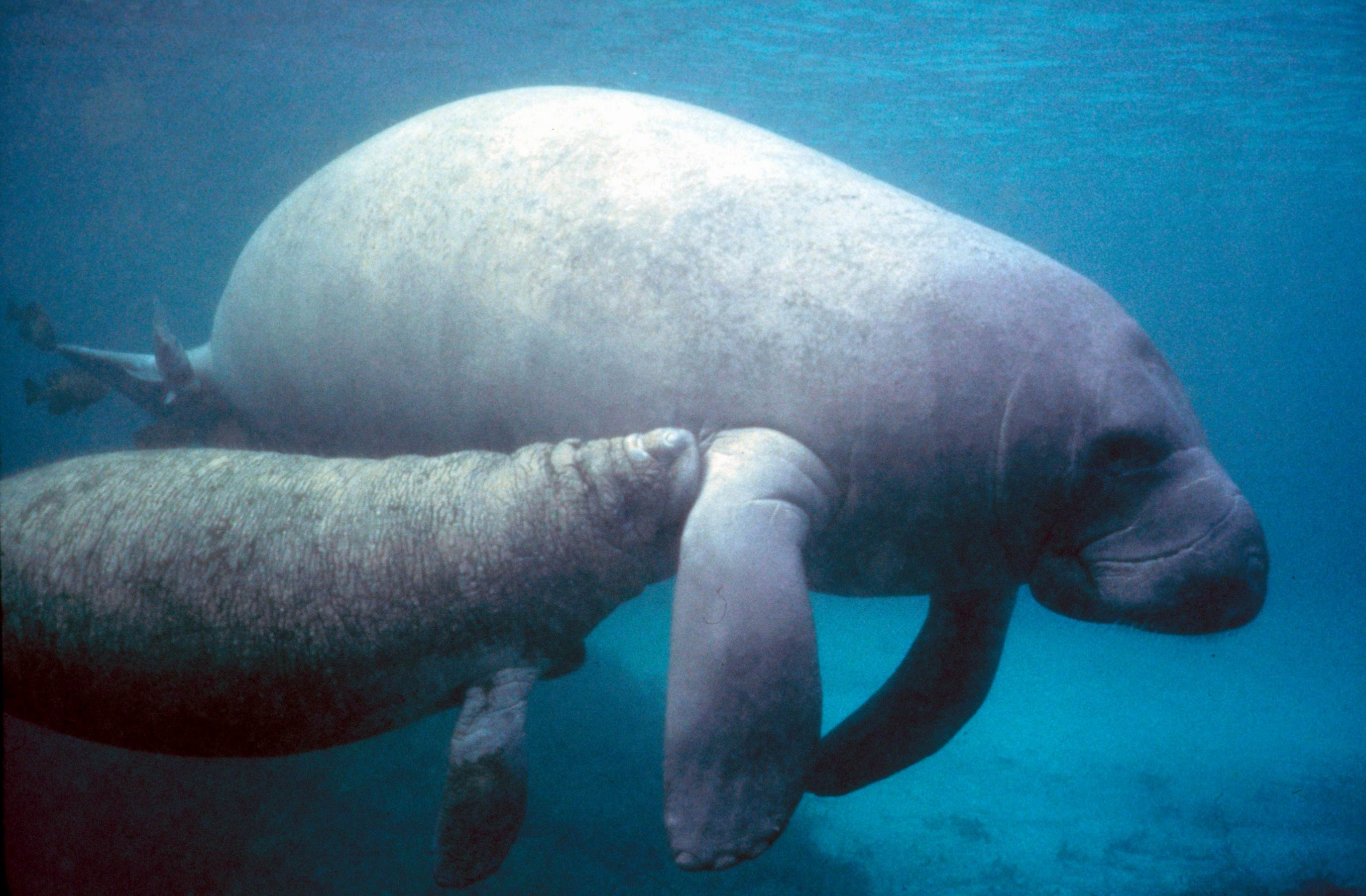
  - A living Trichechus manatus, or West Indian manatee
    †Trichechus manatus
- Tricolia
  - †Tricolia umbilicata
  - †Trigonictis macrodon
- Trigonostoma
- Triloculina
- †Trinacria
- Tringa
  - †Tringa melanoleuca
  - †Tringa solitaria
- Triphora
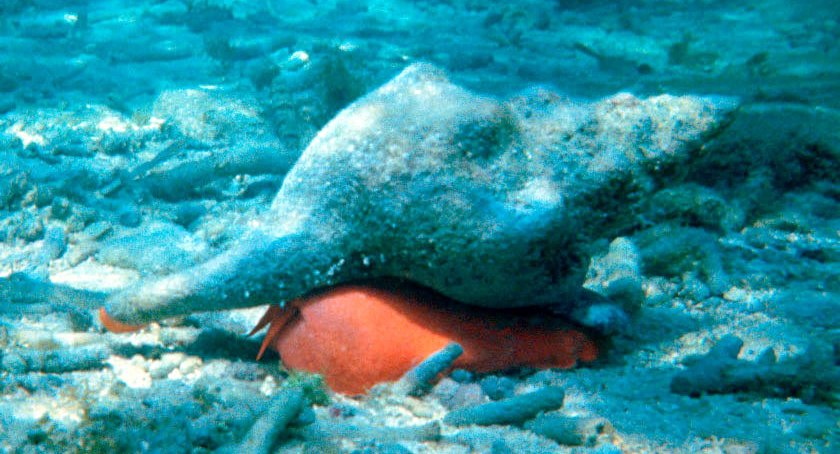
- A living Triplofusus papillosus, or Florida horse conch
  Triplofusus
  - †Triplofusus giganteus
- Tritonoharpa
  - †Tritonoharpa lanceolata
- Trivia
- Trochita
- Troglodytes
  - †Troglodytes aedon
- Trona
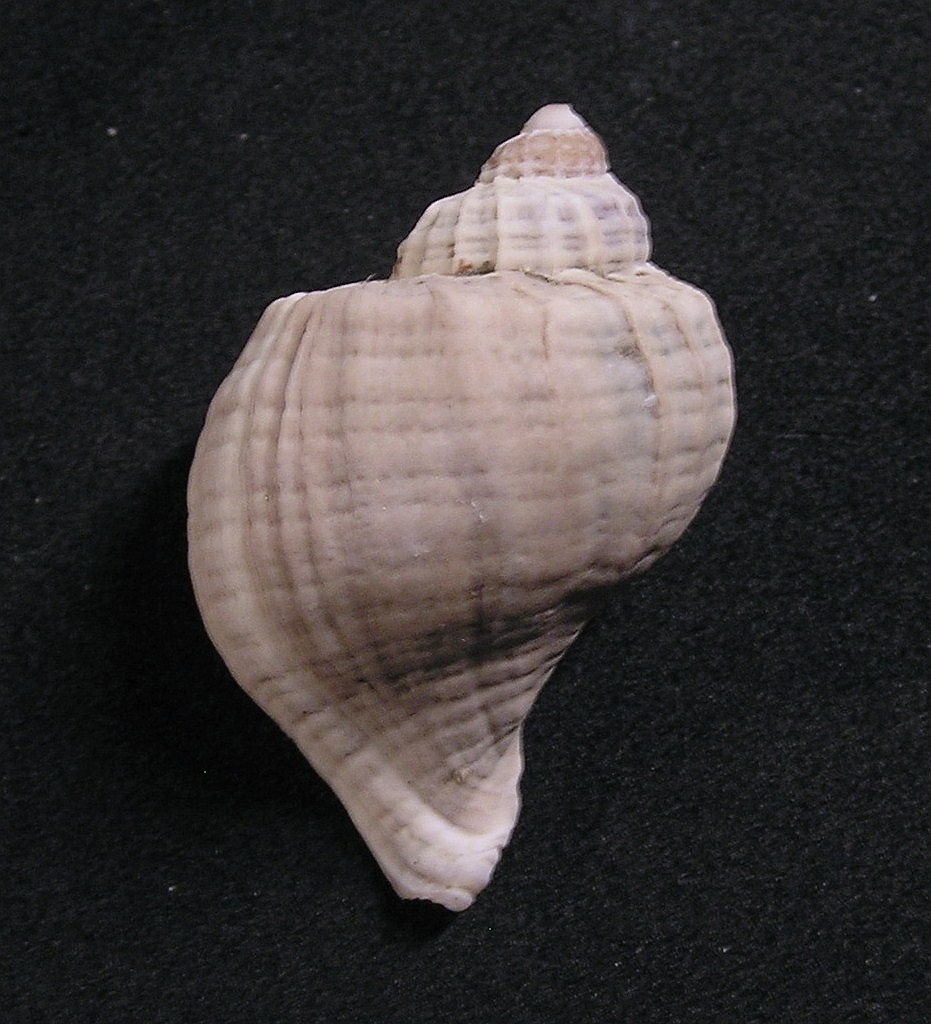
- Shell of a Trophon murex snail
  Trophon
- †Tropidophis – or unidentified comparable form
- Tucetona
- Turbinella
- Turbo
  - †Turbo castanea
- Turbonilla
  - †Turbonilla hemphilli
  - †Turbonilla levis – or unidentified comparable form
- Turdus
- Turritella
  - †Turritella apicalis
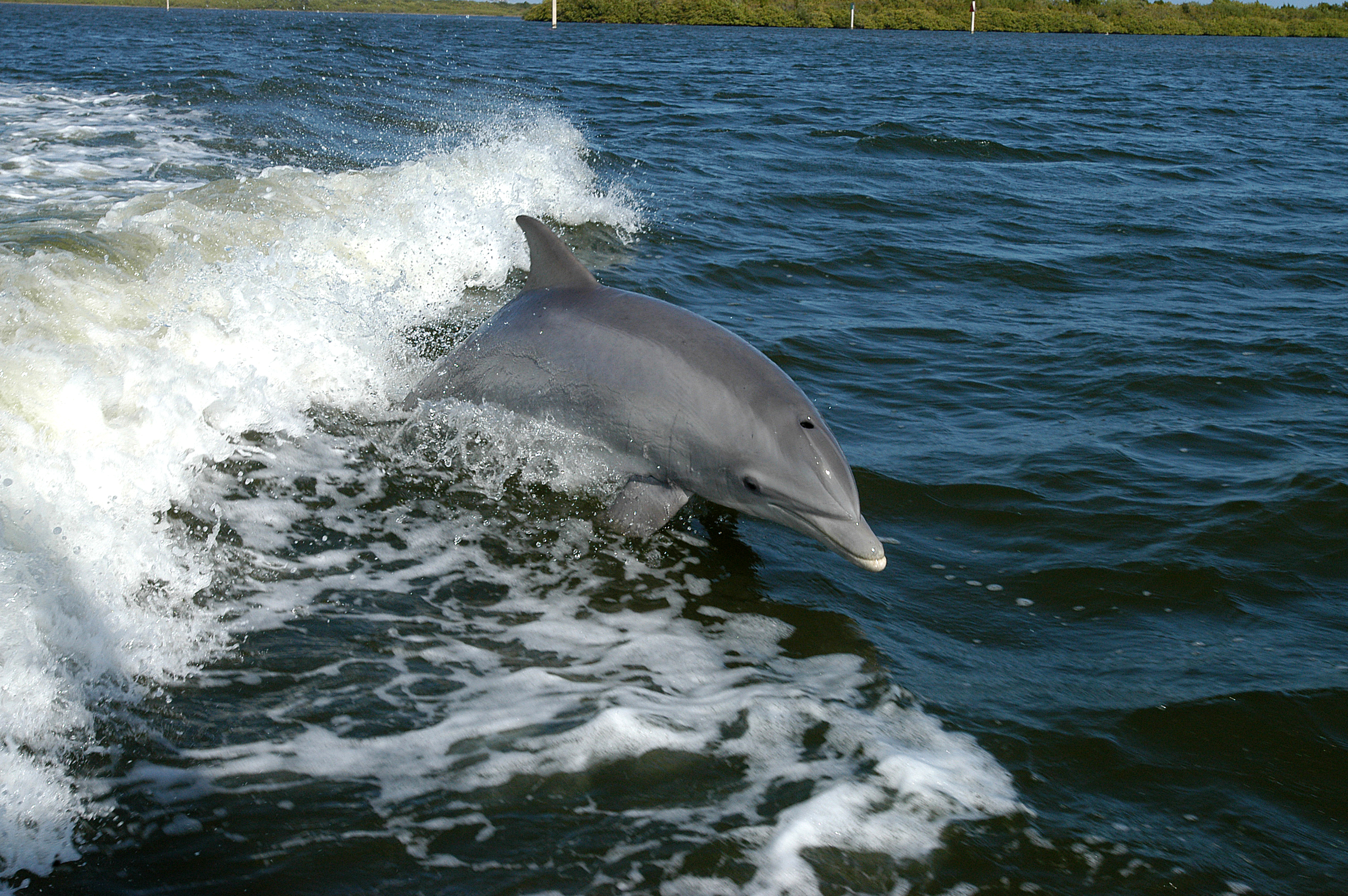
- A living Tursiops, or bottlenose dolphin
  Tursiops – or unidentified comparable form
- Tutufa
- Tympanuchus
  - †Tympanuchus cupido
- Typhina
- Typhinellus
- Typhis
- Typhlops – tentative report
- Tyrannus
  - †Tyrannus tyrannus
- Tyronia
- Tyto
  - †Tyto furcata
- Ulmus
- †Urocoptis
- Urocyon
  - †Urocyon cinereoargenteus
- Urosalpinx
  - †Urosalpinx cinerea
  - †Urosalpinx perrugata
- Ursus
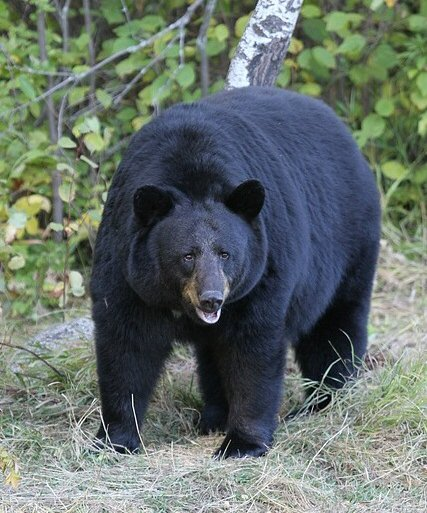
  - A living Ursus americanus, or American black bear
    †Ursus americanus
- Vasum
  - †Vasum horridum
  - †Vasum muricatum
- †Velates
- Venericardia
- Ventricolaria
- Venus
- Vermicularia
  - †Vermicularia fargoi
  - †Vermicularia spirata
- Vermivora
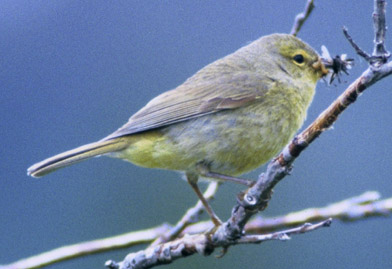
  - Orange-crowned warbler Quintana, Texas
    †Vermivora celata – or unidentified comparable form
- Verticordia
- Vertigo
  - †Vertigo milium
  - †Vertigo ovata
- Vexillum
  - †Vexillum wandoense
- †Viburnum
  - †Viburnum dentatum – or unidentified comparable form
  - †Viburnum nudum
- †Vireo
  - †Vireo griseus
- Vitis
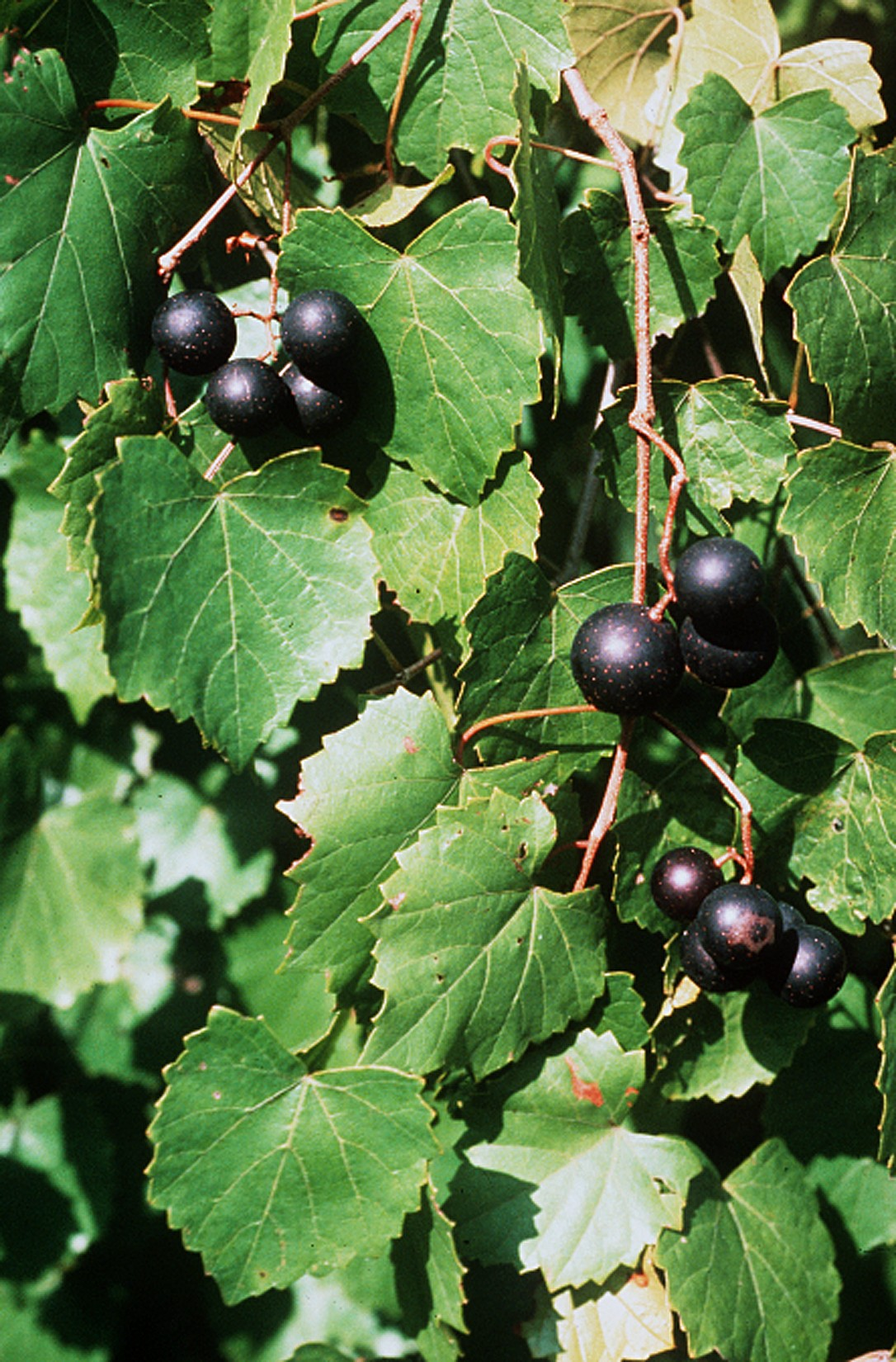
  - Fruit and foliage of living Vitis rotundifolia, or muscadine grape vines
    Vitis rotundifolia – or unidentified comparable form
- †Vitricythara
- Vitrinella
- Vitularia
- Viviparus
  - †Viviparus georgianus
- Vokesimurex
  - †Vokesimurex anniae
  - †Vokesimurex bellegladeensis
  - †Vokesimurex rubidus
- Volsella
- Volutifusus
- Volvarina
  - †Volvarina albolineata
  - †Volvarina avena
- Vulpes
  - Vulpes vulpes – type locality for species
- †Xanthium
- Xenophora
  - †Xenophora conchyliophora
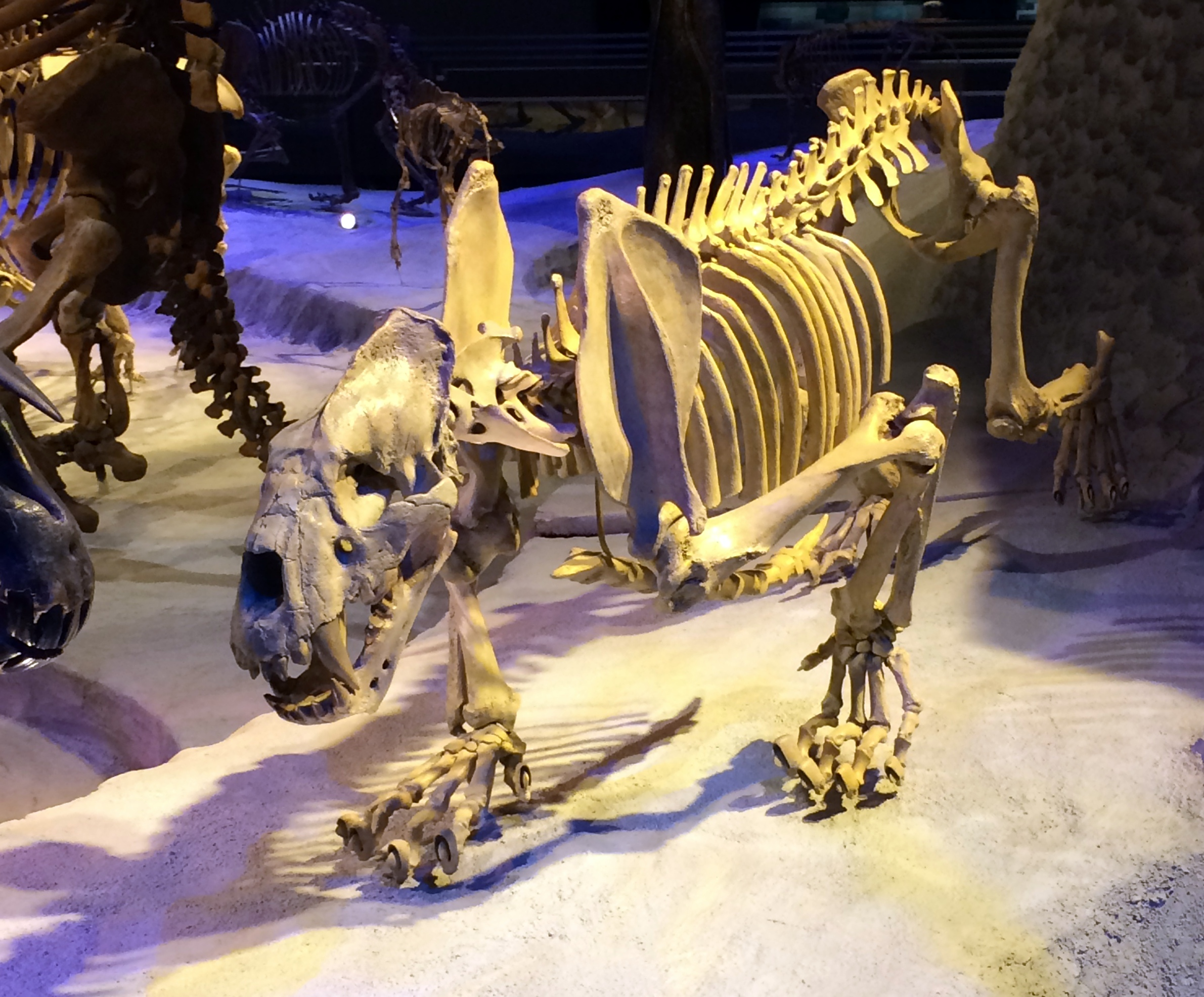
- Mounted fossilized skeleton of the Pleistocene saber-toothed cat Xenosmilus
  †Xenosmilus – type locality for genus
  - †Xenosmilus hodsonae – type locality for species
- Yoldia
- †Yumaceras
- Zapus
- Zebina
  - †Zebina browniana
  - †Zebina laevigata
- Zenaida
  - †Zenaida macroura
- †Zenaidura
  - †Zenaidura macroura
- Zizyphus
- †Zodiolestes
- Zonaria
- Zonitoides
  - †Zonitoides arboreus
- Zonotrichia
  - †Zonotrichia albicollis – or unidentified comparable form
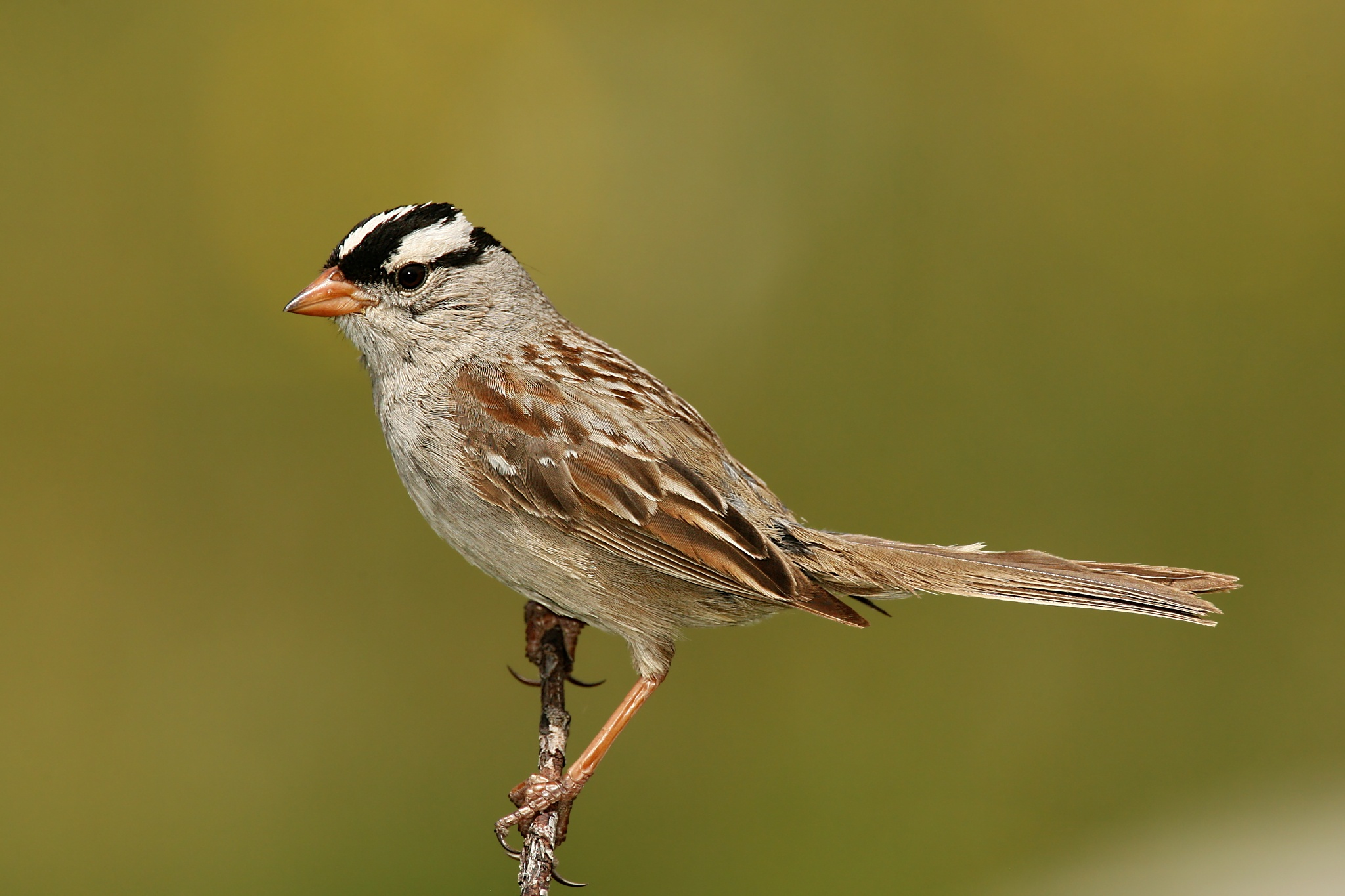
  - A living Zonotrichia leucophrys, or white-crowned sparrow
    †Zonotrichia leucophrys – or unidentified comparable form
- Zonulispira
  - †Zonulispira crocata
