= Caecum cycloferum =

Scientific classification
- Kingdom: Animalia
- Phylum: Mollusca
- Class: Gastropoda
- Subclass: Caenogastropoda
- Order: Littorinimorpha
- Family: Caecidae
- Genus: Caecum
- Species: C. cycloferum

Binomial name
- Caecum cycloferum Folin, 1867

Species of gastropod

Caecum cycloferum is a species of small sea snail, a marine gastropod mollusk or micromollusk in the family Caecidae.

== Description ==
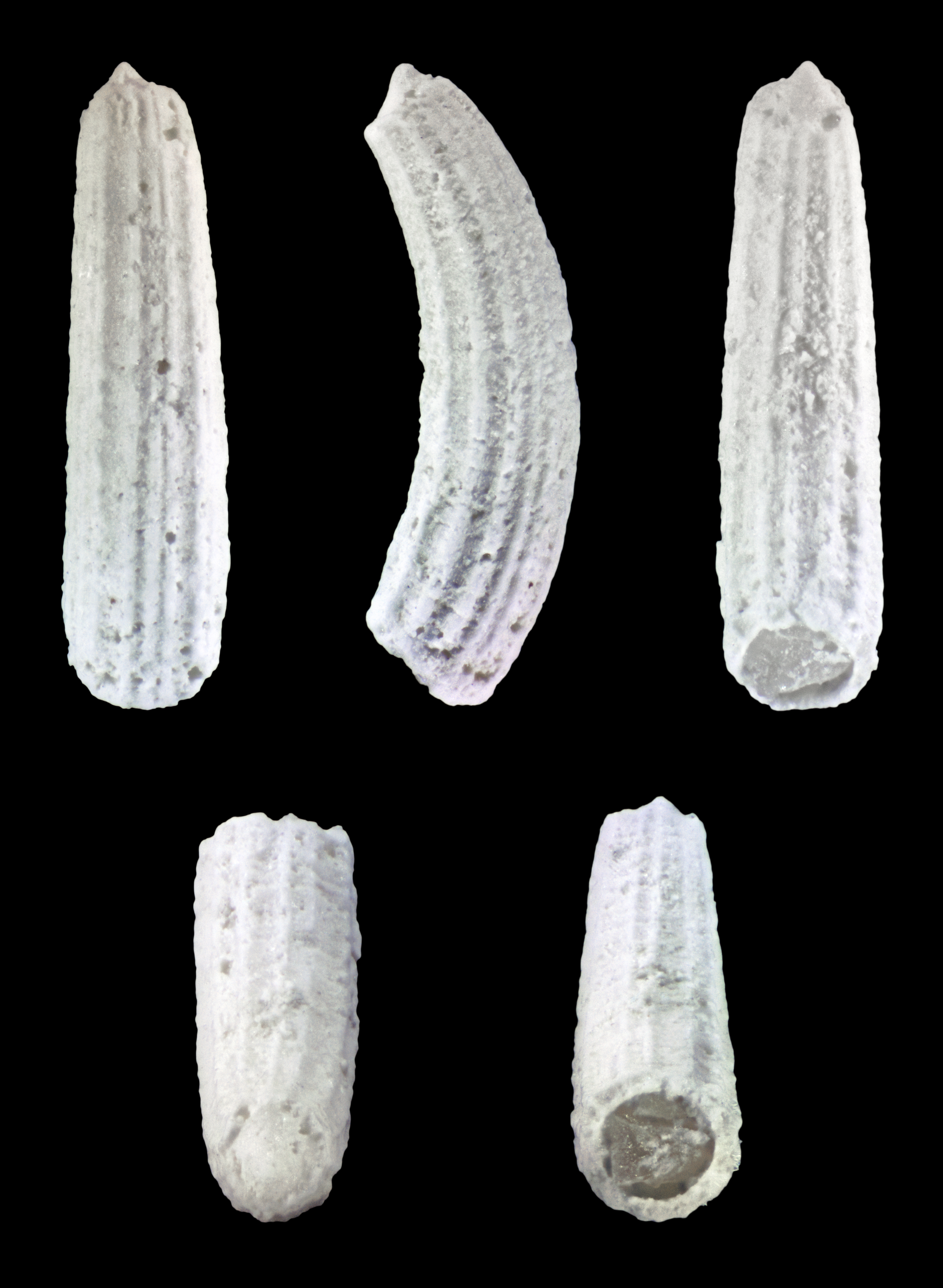
Fossil specimen, Pliocene, Florida

The maximum recorded shell length is 6 mm.

== Habitat ==
Minimum recorded depth is 0 m. Maximum recorded depth is 101 m.
