= Caecum armoricum =

Scientific classification
- Kingdom: Animalia
- Phylum: Mollusca
- Class: Gastropoda
- Subclass: Caenogastropoda
- Order: Littorinimorpha
- Family: Caecidae
- Genus: Caecum
- Species: C. armoricum

Binomial name
- Caecum armoricum de Folin, 1869

Synonyms
- Brochina incompta Monterosato, 1884; Caecum tenue Milaschevitsch, 1912

Species of gastropod

Caecum armoricum, common name the DeFolin's lagoon snail, is a species of small sea snail, a marine gastropod mollusk or micromollusk in the family Caecidae.

== Distribution ==
This species occurs in the following locations:

- European waters
- Mediterranean Sea: Greece
- Atlantic Ocean: Azores, Cape Verde
