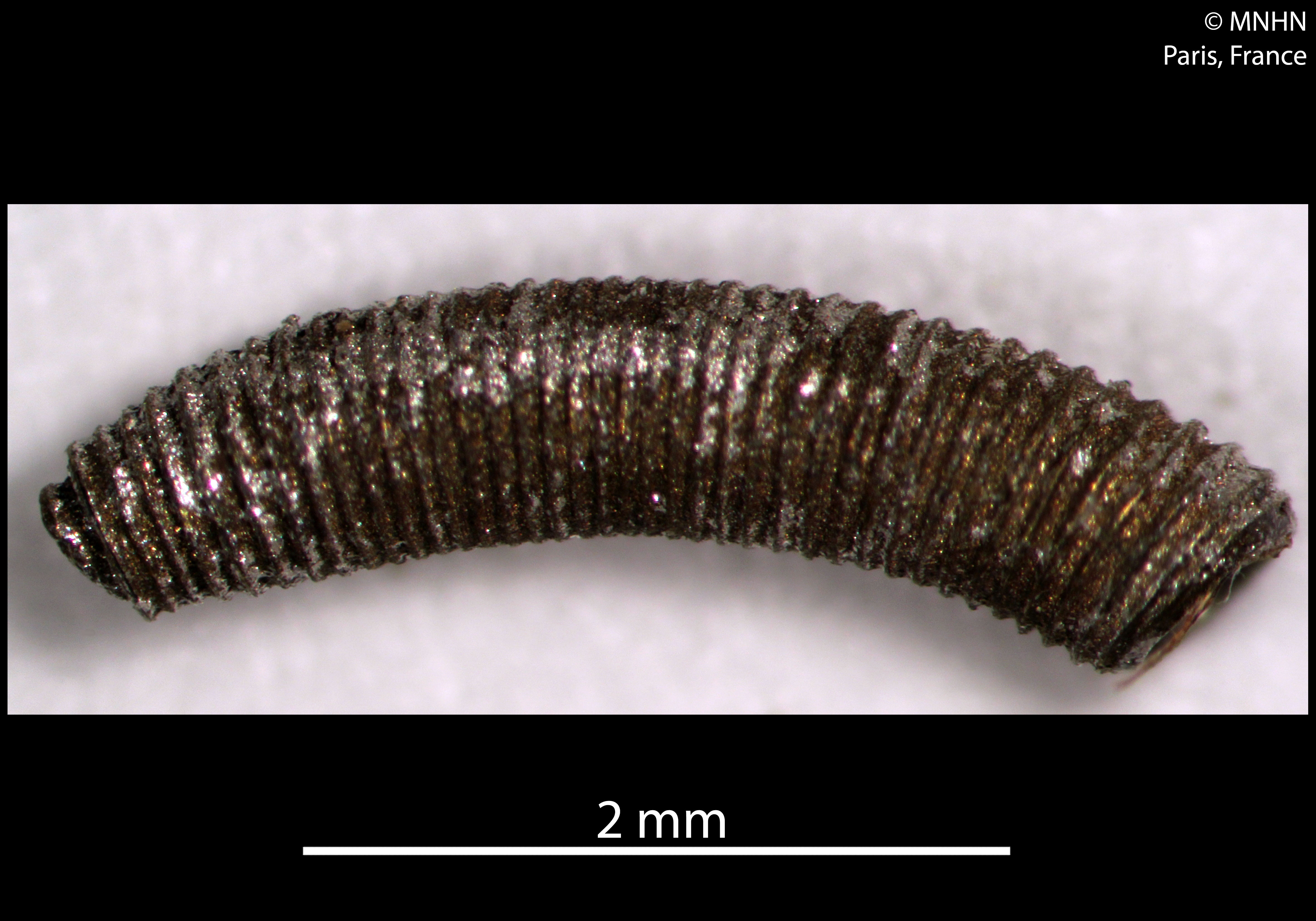

Scientific classification
- Kingdom: Animalia
- Phylum: Mollusca
- Class: Gastropoda
- Subclass: Caenogastropoda
- Order: Littorinimorpha
- Family: Caecidae
- Genus: Caecum
- Species: C. clarum

Binomial name
- Caecum clarum de Folin in Lamy, 1910

= Caecum clarum =

Species of gastropod

Caecum clarum is a species of minute sea snail, a marine gastropod mollusk or micromollusk in the family Caecidae.
