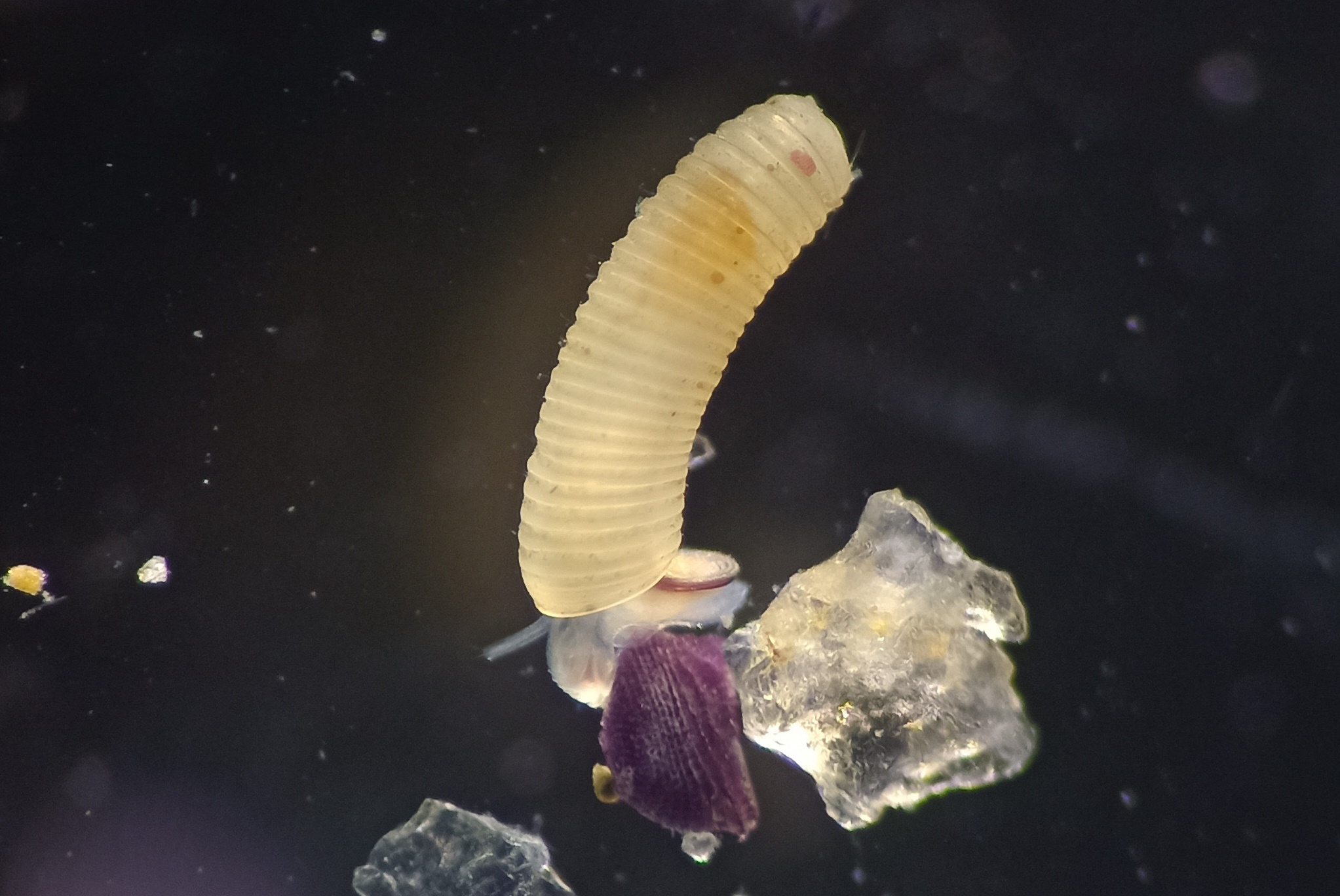

Scientific classification
- Kingdom: Animalia
- Phylum: Mollusca
- Class: Gastropoda
- Subclass: Caenogastropoda
- Order: Littorinimorpha
- Family: Caecidae
- Genus: Caecum
- Species: C. brasilicum

Binomial name
- Caecum brasilicum Folin, 1874

= Caecum brasilicum =

Species of gastropod

Caecum brasilicum is a species of small sea snail, a marine gastropod mollusk or micromollusk in the family Caecidae.

== Distribution ==
Caecum brasilicum has been found to live in the Exclusive economic zone of Brazil or Blue Amazon.

== Description ==
The maximum recorded shell length is 4 mm.

== Habitat ==
Minimum recorded depth is 2 m. Maximum recorded depth is 24 m.
