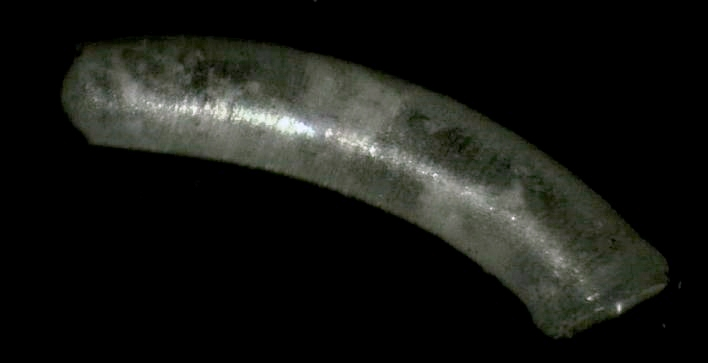
- Shell of Caecum auriculatum

Scientific classification
- Kingdom: Animalia
- Phylum: Mollusca
- Class: Gastropoda
- Subclass: Caenogastropoda
- Order: Littorinimorpha
- Family: Caecidae
- Genus: Caecum
- Species: C. auriculatum

Binomial name
- Caecum auriculatum de Folin, 1868

= Caecum auriculatum =

Species of gastropod

Caecum auriculatum is a species of small sea snail, a marine gastropod mollusk or micromollusk in the family Caecidae.
