= Caecum bipartitum =

Scientific classification
- Kingdom: Animalia
- Phylum: Mollusca
- Class: Gastropoda
- Subclass: Caenogastropoda
- Order: Littorinimorpha
- Family: Caecidae
- Genus: Caecum
- Species: C. bipartitum

Binomial name
- Caecum bipartitum Folin, 1870

Species of gastropod

Caecum bipartitum is a species of small sea snail, a marine gastropod mollusk or micromollusk in the family Caecidae.

== Description ==
The maximum recorded shell length is 2.5 mm.

== Habitat ==
Minimum recorded depth is 1.5 m. Maximum recorded depth is 66 m.
