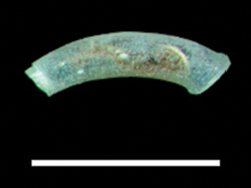

Scientific classification
- Kingdom: Animalia
- Phylum: Mollusca
- Class: Gastropoda
- Subclass: Caenogastropoda
- Order: Littorinimorpha
- Family: Caecidae
- Genus: Caecum
- Species: C. circumvolutum

Binomial name
- Caecum circumvolutum Folin, 1867

= Caecum circumvolutum =

Species of gastropod

Caecum circumvolutum is a species of small sea snail, a marine gastropod mollusk or micromollusk in the family Caecidae.

== Description ==
The maximum recorded shell length is 3.3 mm.

== Habitat ==
Minimum recorded depth is 1.5 m. Maximum recorded depth is 40 m.
