= Caecum multicostatum =

Scientific classification
- Kingdom: Animalia
- Phylum: Mollusca
- Class: Gastropoda
- Subclass: Caenogastropoda
- Order: Littorinimorpha
- Family: Caecidae
- Genus: Caecum
- Species: C. multicostatum

Binomial name
- Caecum multicostatum Folin, 1867

Species of gastropod

Caecum multicostatum is a species of minute sea snail, a marine gastropod mollusk or micromollusk in the family Caecidae.

== Distribution ==
Caecum Multicostatum can be found in the Caribbean Sea, Gulf of Mexico, and Venezuela

== Description ==
The maximum recorded shell length is 4.2 mm.

== Habitat ==
Minimum recorded depth is 2 m. Maximum recorded depth is 46 m.
