= Caecum cinctum =

Scientific classification
- Kingdom: Animalia
- Phylum: Mollusca
- Class: Gastropoda
- Subclass: Caenogastropoda
- Order: Littorinimorpha
- Family: Caecidae
- Genus: Caecum
- Species: C. cinctum

Binomial name
- Caecum cinctum Olsson & Harbison, 1953

Species of gastropod

Caecum cinctum is a species of small sea snail, a marine gastropod mollusk or micromollusk in the family Caecidae.

== Description ==
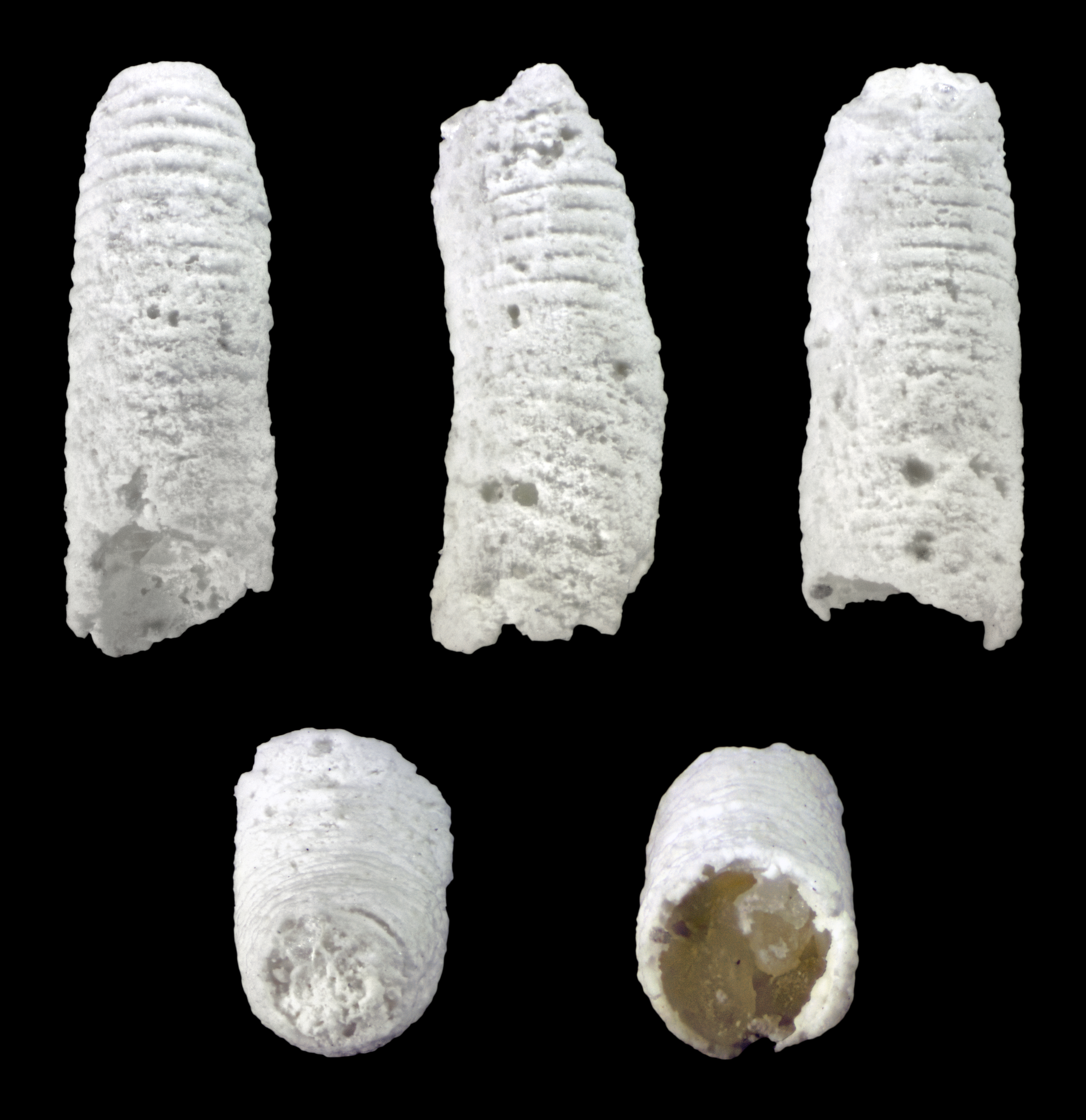
Fossil, Pliocene, Florida

The maximum recorded shell length is 2.8 mm.

== Habitat ==
Minimum recorded depth is 0 m. Maximum recorded depth is 2 m.
