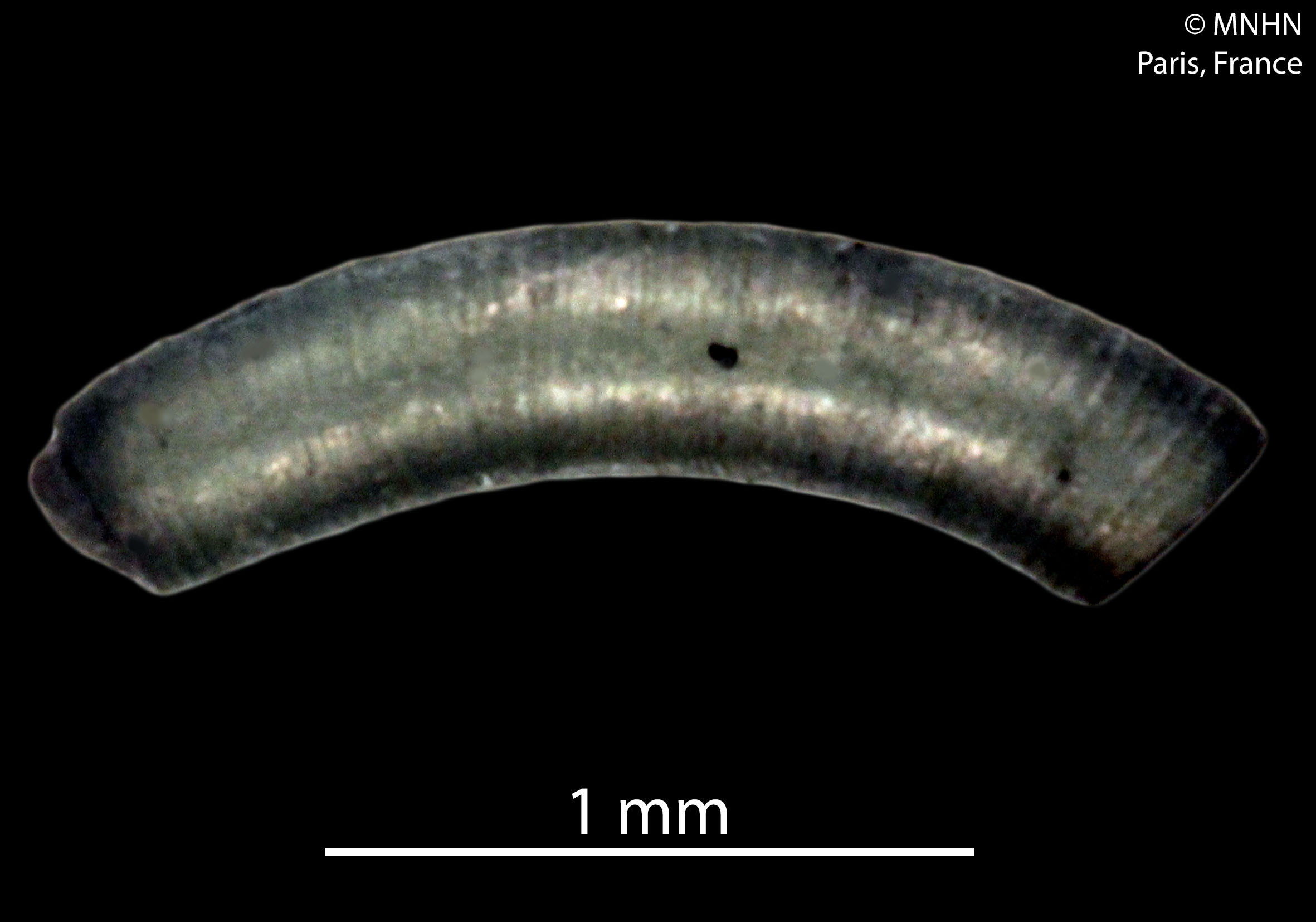
- Shell of Caecum rehderi (specimen at MNHN, Paris)

Scientific classification
- Kingdom: Animalia
- Phylum: Mollusca
- Class: Gastropoda
- Subclass: Caenogastropoda
- Order: Littorinimorpha
- Family: Caecidae
- Genus: Caecum
- Species: C. rehderi

Binomial name
- Caecum rehderi Raines & Pizzini, 2005

= Caecum rehderi =

Species of gastropod

Caecum rehderi is a species of minute sea snail, a marine gastropod mollusk or micromollusk in the family Caecidae.

== Distribution ==
This marine species occurs off French Polynesia.
