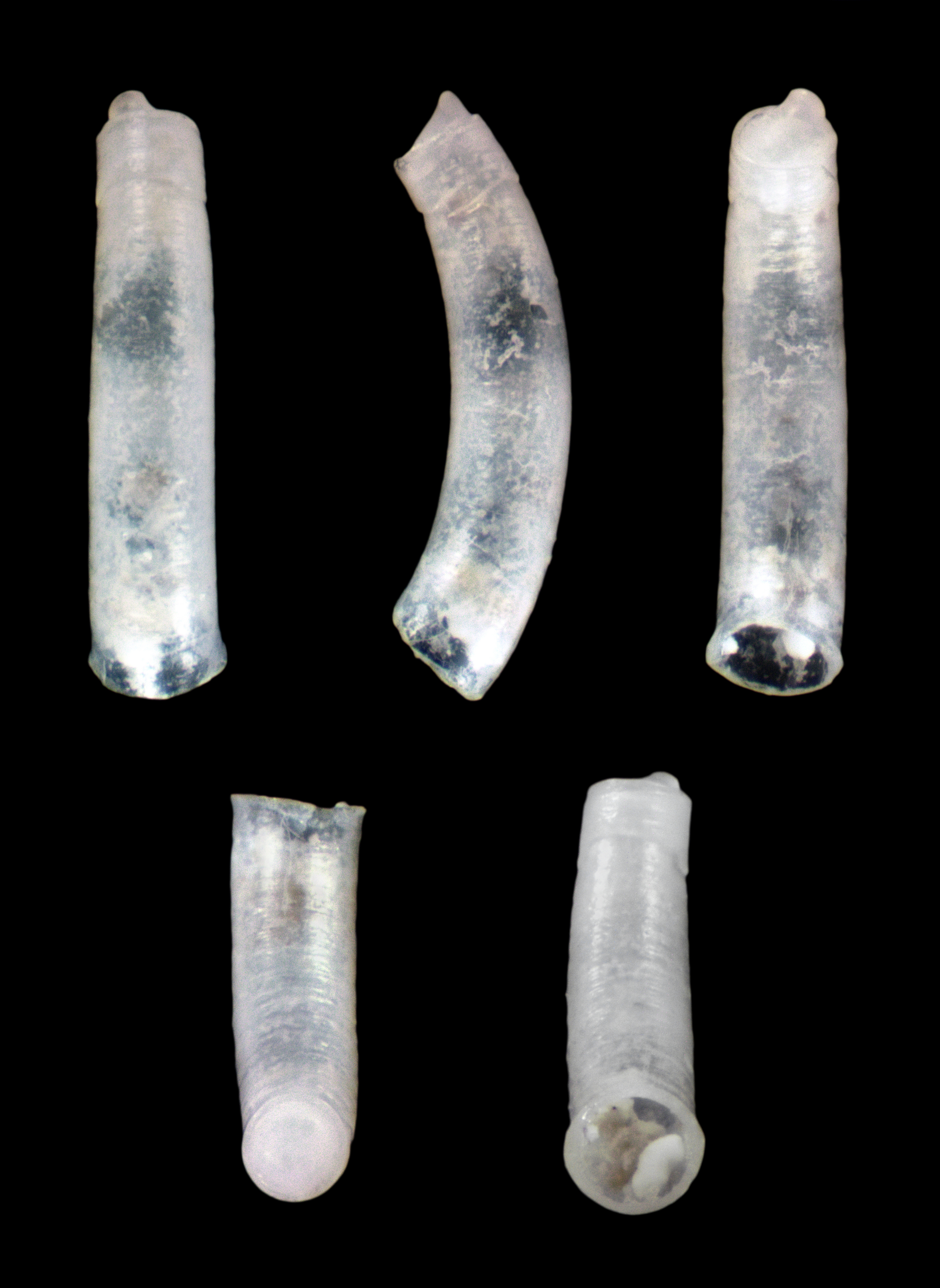

Scientific classification
- Kingdom: Animalia
- Phylum: Mollusca
- Class: Gastropoda
- Subclass: Caenogastropoda
- Order: Littorinimorpha
- Family: Caecidae
- Genus: Caecum
- Species: C. condylum

Binomial name
- Caecum condylum Moore, 1969

= Caecum condylum =

Species of gastropod

Caecum condylum is a species of small sea snail, a marine gastropod mollusc or micromollusk in the family Caecidae.

== Description ==
The maximum recorded shell length is 3.36 mm.

== Habitat ==
Minimum recorded depth is 12 m. Maximum recorded depth is 53 m.
