= Caecum regulare =

Scientific classification
- Kingdom: Animalia
- Phylum: Mollusca
- Class: Gastropoda
- Subclass: Caenogastropoda
- Order: Littorinimorpha
- Family: Caecidae
- Genus: Caecum
- Species: C. regulare

Binomial name
- Caecum regulare Carpenter, 1858

Species of gastropod

Caecum regulare is a species of minute sea snail, a marine gastropod mollusk or micromollusk in the family Caecidae.

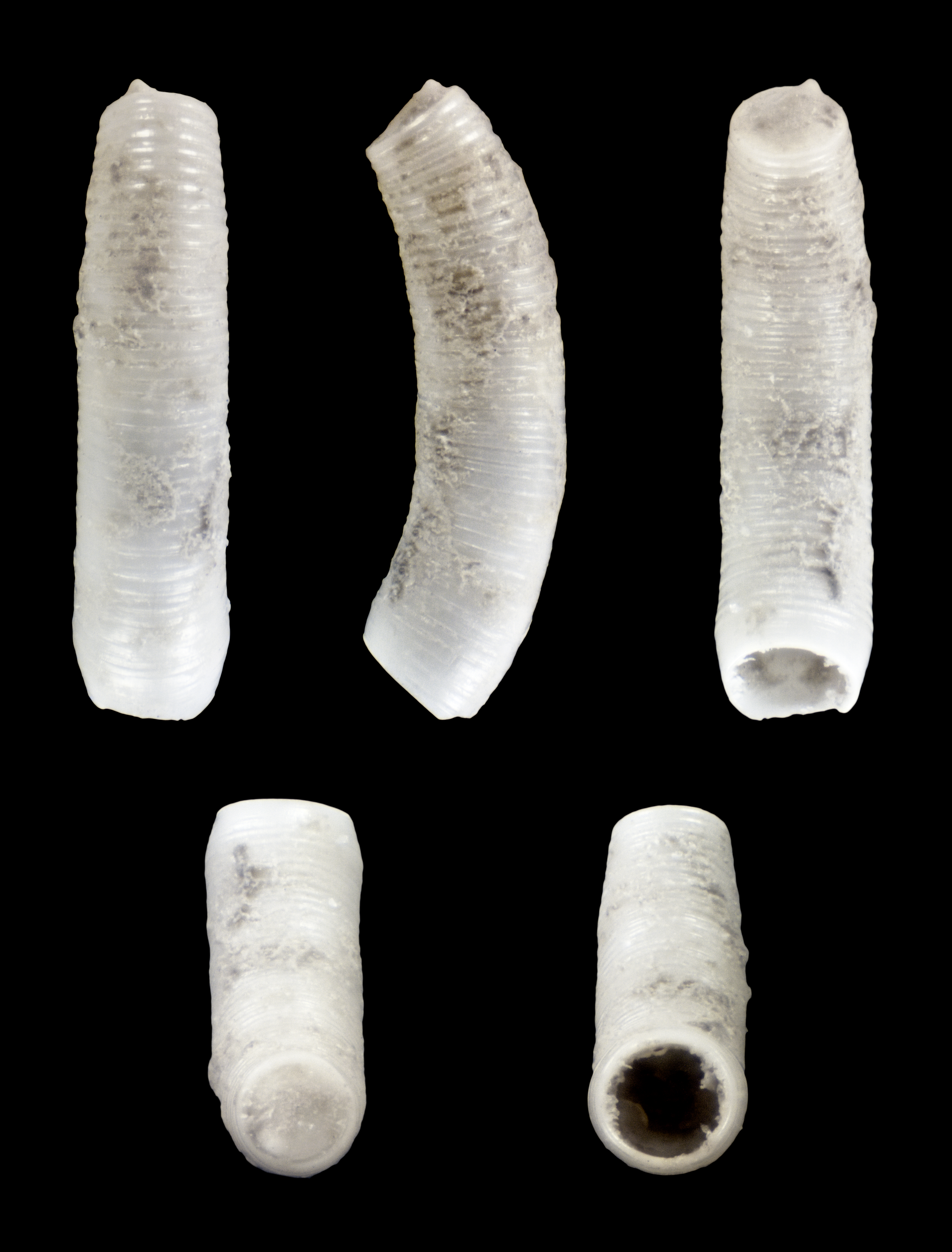
Fossil shell of the Pliocene of Florida

== Description ==
The maximum recorded shell length is 2.5 mm.

== Habitat ==
Minimum recorded depth is 0 m. Maximum recorded depth is 58 m.
