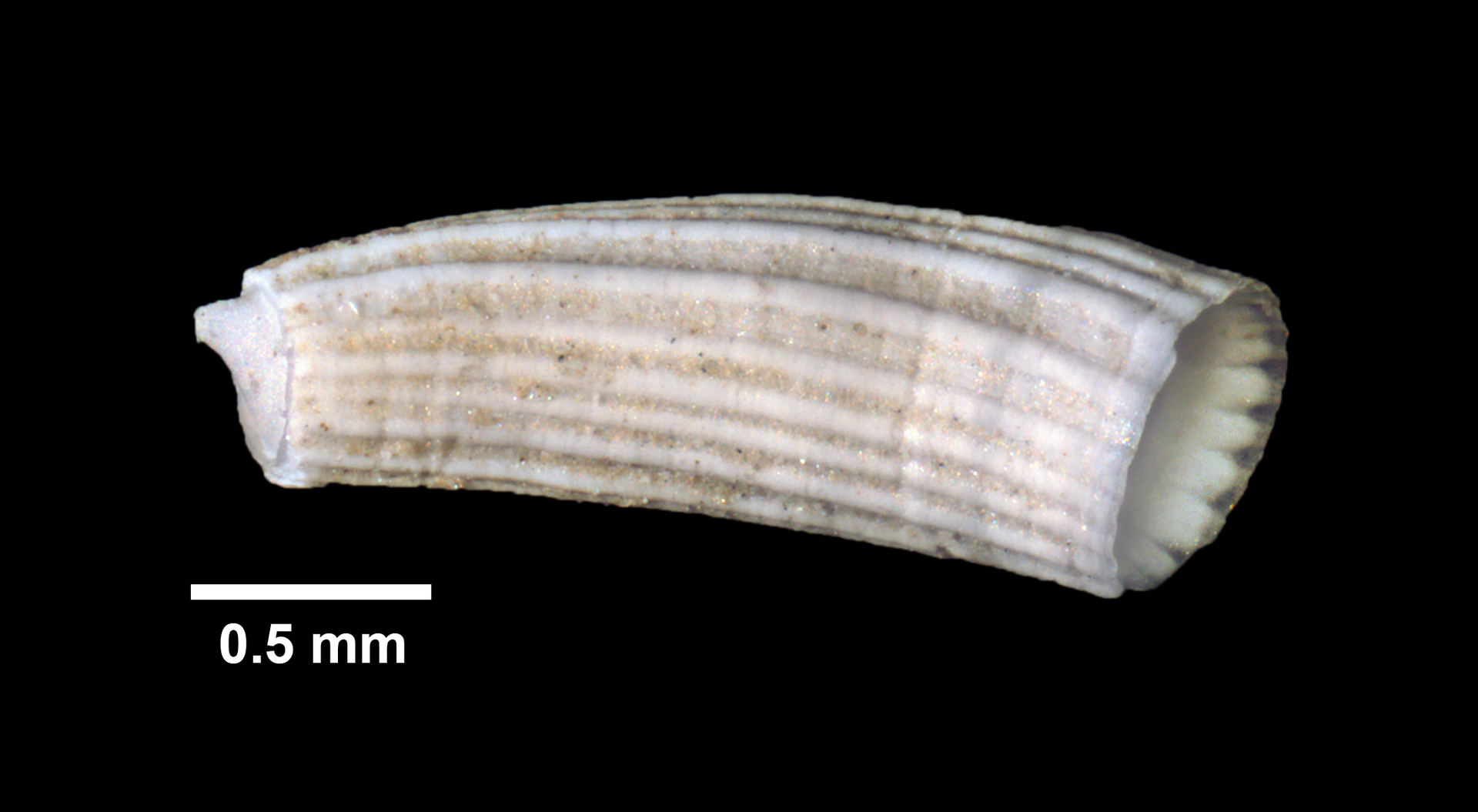

Scientific classification
- Kingdom: Animalia
- Phylum: Mollusca
- Class: Gastropoda
- Subclass: Caenogastropoda
- Order: Littorinimorpha
- Family: Caecidae
- Genus: Caecum
- Species: C. cooperi

Binomial name
- Caecum cooperi S. Smith, 1860

= Caecum cooperi =

Species of gastropod

Caecum cooperi, common name the Cooper's Atlantic caecum, is a species of small sea snail, a marine gastropod mollusk or micromollusk in the family Caecidae.

== Description ==
The maximum recorded shell length is 6.1 mm.

== Habitat ==
Minimum recorded depth is 0 m. Maximum recorded depth is 73 m.
