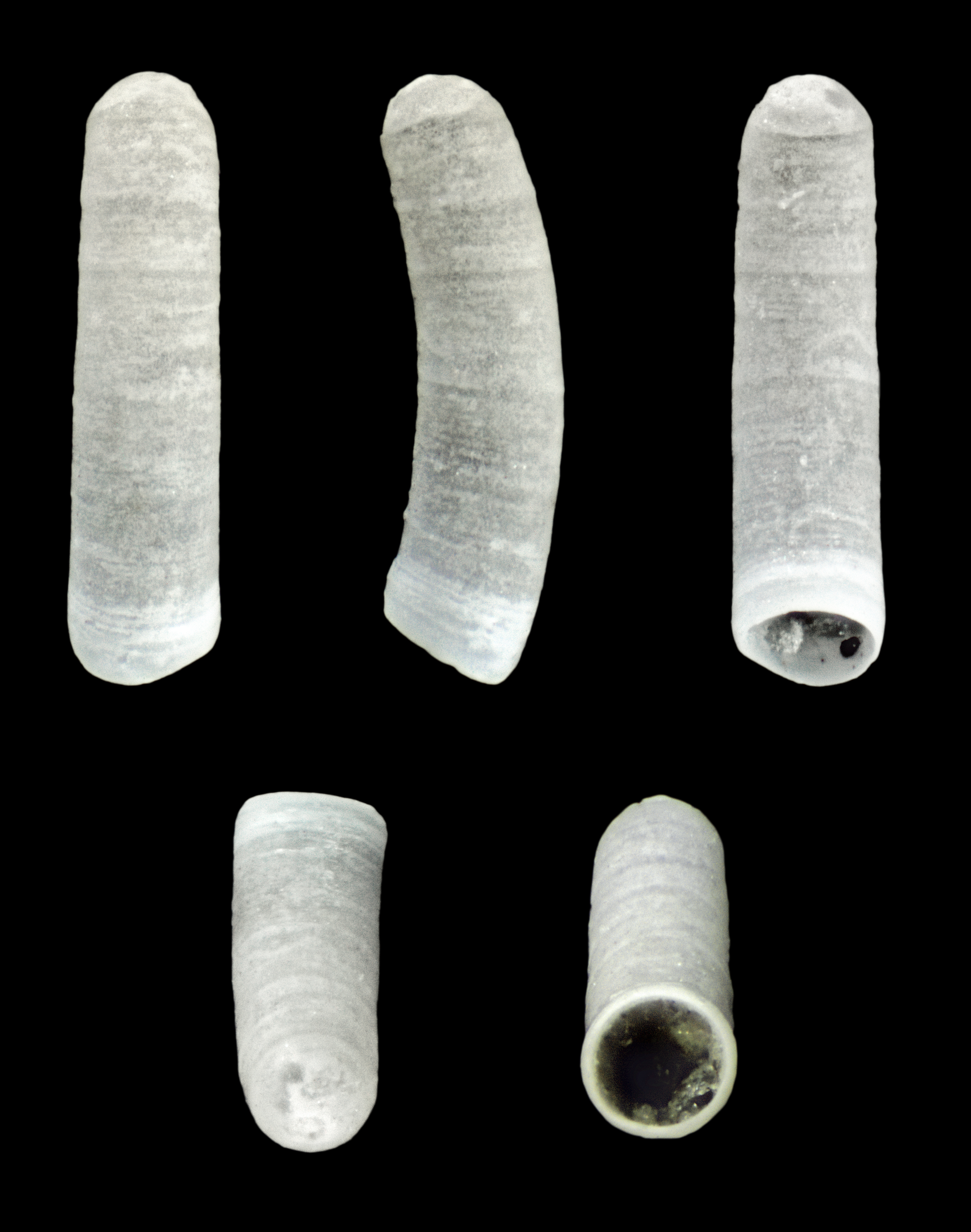

Conservation status
- Naturally Uncommon (NZ TCS)

Scientific classification
- Kingdom: Animalia
- Phylum: Mollusca
- Class: Gastropoda
- Subclass: Caenogastropoda
- Order: Littorinimorpha
- Family: Caecidae
- Genus: Caecum
- Species: C. maori

Binomial name
- Caecum maori Pizzini & Raines, 2006

= Caecum maori =

Species of gastropod

Caecum maori is a species of minute sea snail, a marine gastropod mollusc or micromollusc in the family Caecidae.
