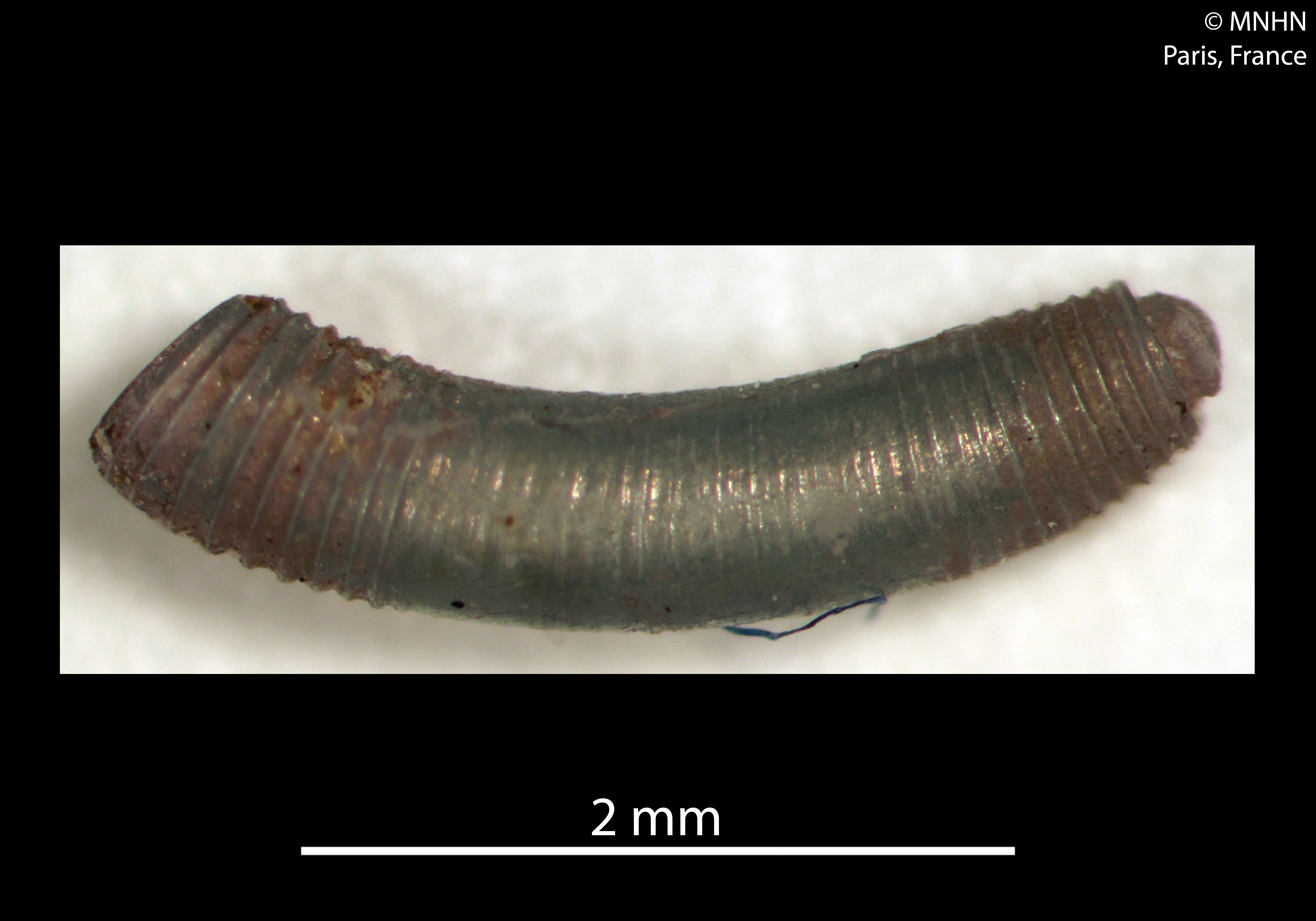
- Shell of Caecum varanoi (specimen at MNHN, Paris)

Scientific classification
- Kingdom: Animalia
- Phylum: Mollusca
- Class: Gastropoda
- Subclass: Caenogastropoda
- Order: Littorinimorpha
- Family: Caecidae
- Genus: Caecum
- Species: C. varanoi

Binomial name
- Caecum varanoi Pizzini, Nofroni & Bonfitto, 2008

= Caecum varanoi =

Species of gastropod

Caecum varanoi is a species of small sea snail, a marine gastropod mollusk or micromollusk in the family Caecidae.

== Distribution ==
This marine species occurs off Vanuatu.
