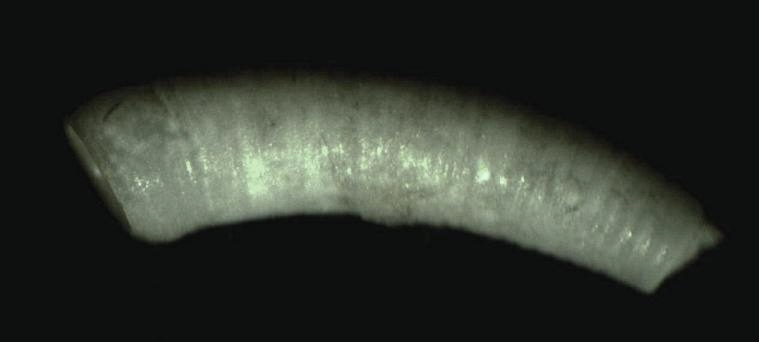
- shell of Caecum trachea

Scientific classification
- Kingdom: Animalia
- Phylum: Mollusca
- Class: Gastropoda
- Subclass: Caenogastropoda
- Order: Littorinimorpha
- Family: Caecidae
- Genus: Caecum
- Species: C. trachea

Binomial name
- Caecum trachea (Montagu, 1803)

Synonyms
- Brochus striatus T. Brown, 1827; Brochus trachiformis T. Brown, 1827; Caecum elagans Deregaslavtseva, 1891; Caecum elegans Periaslavzev 1891 (? Dubious synonym); Caecum fasciatum de Folin, 1876; Caecum fasciatum var. intaminata de Folin, 1876; Caecum trachea var. obsoleta Carpenter, 1859; Dentalium imperforatum Kanmacher, 1798 (dubious synonym); Odontidium rugulosum Philippi, 1836

= Caecum trachea =

Species of gastropod

Caecum trachea is a species of small sea snail, a marine gastropod mollusk or micromollusk in the family Caecidae.

== Description ==
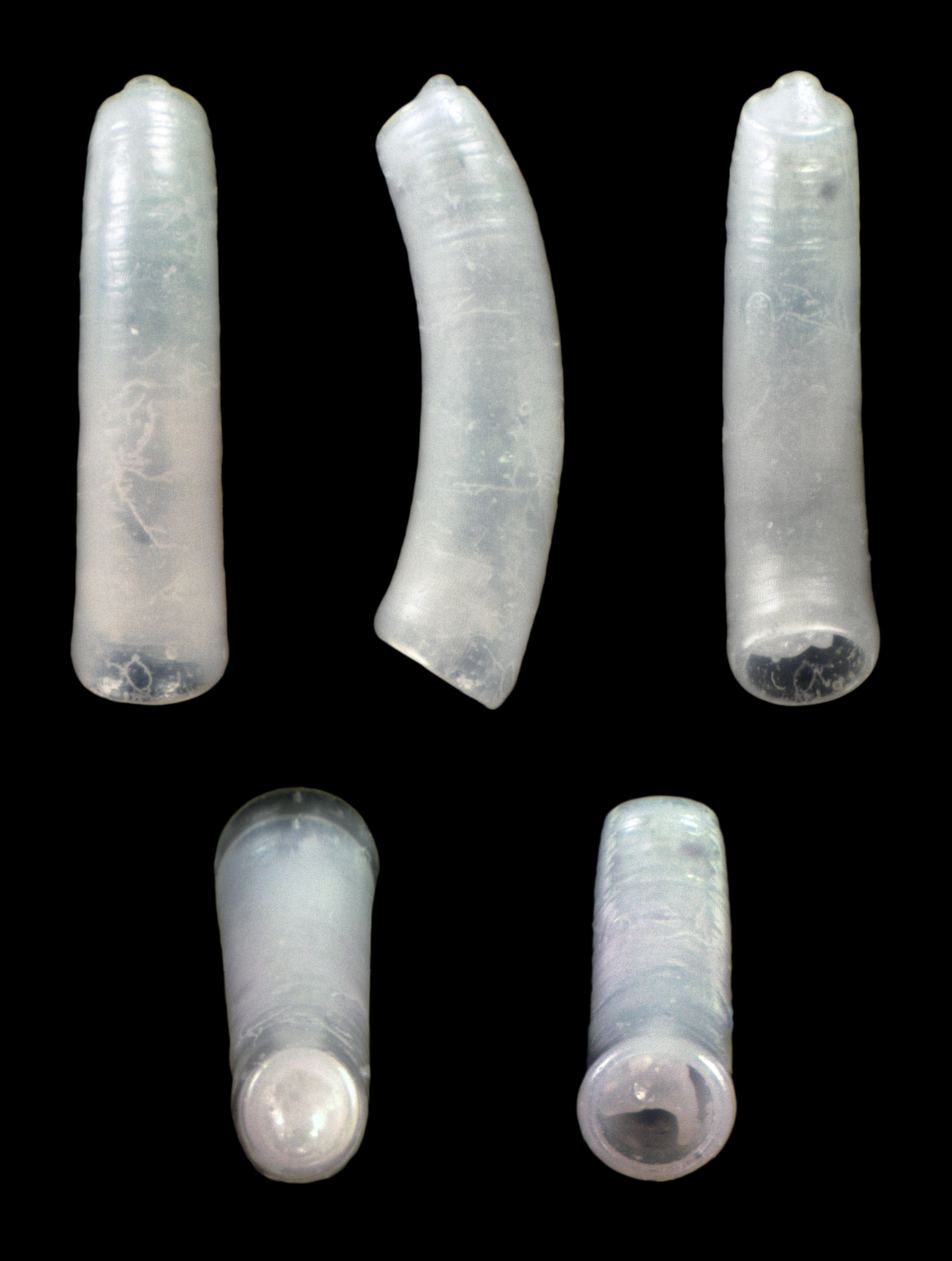
Caecum trachea obsoleta (Carpenter, 1859)

The shell size varies between 2 mm and 4 mm.

== Distribution ==
This species is distributed on rocky shores in European waters from Norway to the Canaries, in the Mediterranean Sea and in the Black Sea
