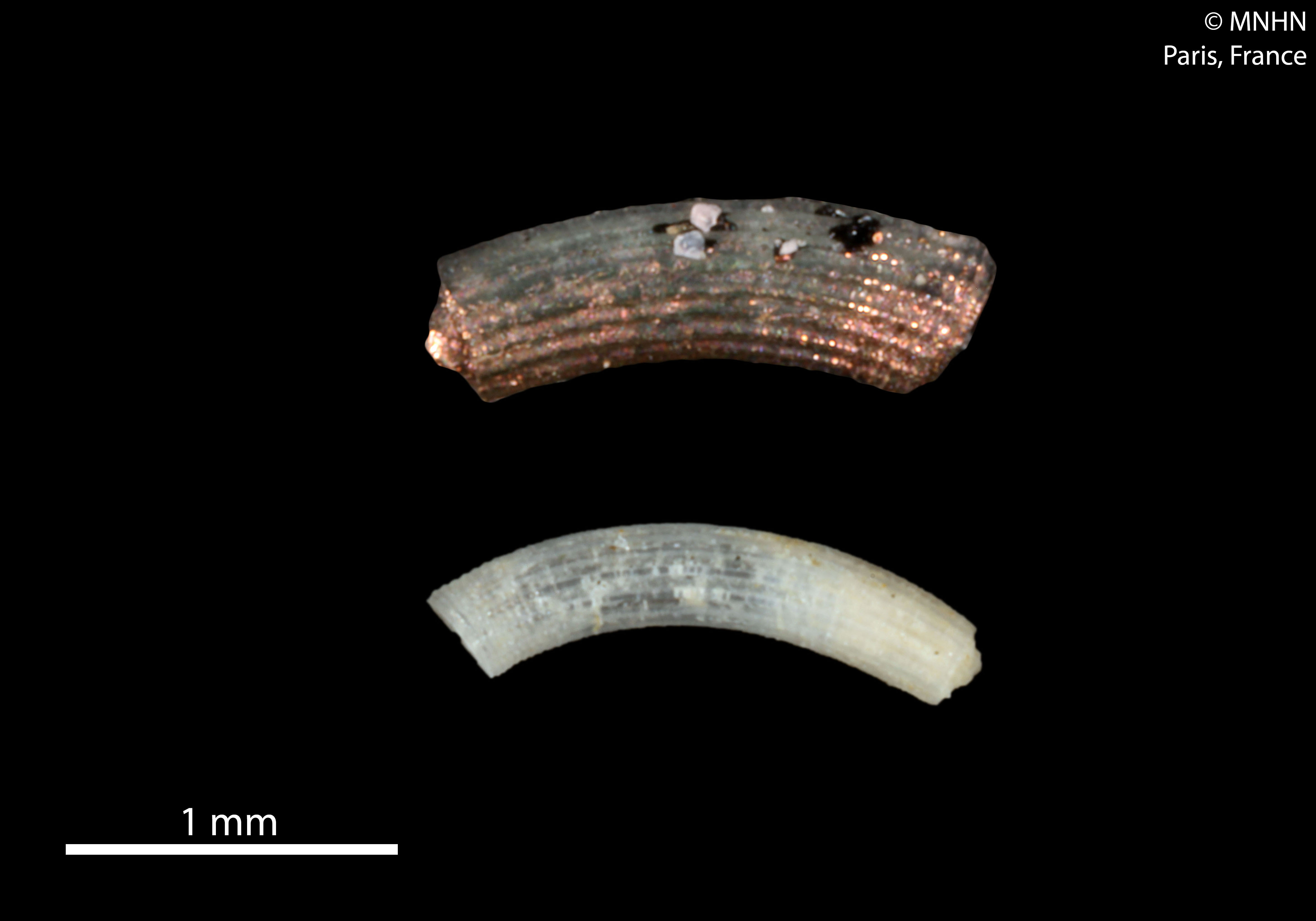

Scientific classification
- Kingdom: Animalia
- Phylum: Mollusca
- Class: Gastropoda
- Subclass: Caenogastropoda
- Order: Littorinimorpha
- Family: Caecidae
- Genus: Caecum
- Species: C. brennani

Binomial name
- Caecum brennani Raines & Pizzini, 2009

= Caecum brennani =

Species of gastropod

Caecum brennani is a species of minute sea snail, a marine gastropod mollusk or micromollusk in the family Caecidae.
