= Caecum mammillatum =

Scientific classification
- Kingdom: Animalia
- Phylum: Mollusca
- Class: Gastropoda
- Subclass: Caenogastropoda
- Order: Littorinimorpha
- Family: Caecidae
- Genus: Caecum
- Species: C. mammillatum

Binomial name
- Caecum mammillatum S.V. Wood, 1848

Species of gastropod

Caecum mammillatum is a species of small sea snail, a marine gastropod mollusk or micromollusk in the family Caecidae.
