= WAMI =

Wami or WAMI may refer to:

- the Wami River in Tanzania
  - Battle of Wami, World War I battle fought near the river
  - Wami Bridge, a bridge crossing the river
- Gete Wami (born 1974), Ethiopian long-distance runner and Olympic medallist
- Mulugeta Wami (born 1982), Ethiopian marathon runner
- West African Monetary Institute, the implementing body of the West African Monetary Zone
- Caecum wami, a species of small sea snail
- Umshini wami, a Zulu language "struggle song"
- Wide-area motion imagery
- ICAO code for Sultan Bantilan Airport
- Wami Taksar, town in Nepal

== Music and media ==
- WAMI-FM, a radio station (102.3 FM) licensed to Opp, Alabama, United States
- WAMI-DT, a television station (channel 24, virtual 69) licensed to Hollywood, Florida, United States
- WAPC (AM), a radio station (880 AM) licensed to Opp, Alabama, United States, which held the call sign WAMI from 1953 to 2025
- West Australian Music Industry Awards
- Wisconsin Area Music Industry
