= Turbonilla ovalis =

Scientific classification
- Kingdom: Animalia
- Phylum: Mollusca
- Class: Gastropoda
- Family: Pyramidellidae
- Genus: Turbonilla
- Species: T. ovalis

Binomial name
- Turbonilla ovalis de Folin, 1868

Synonyms
- Elusa secunda Saurin, 1959

Species of gastropod

Turbonilla ovalis is a species of sea snail, a marine gastropod mollusk in the family Pyramidellidae, the pyramids and their allies.
