= Caecum johnsoni =

Johnson's caecum
- Caecum johnsoni, lateral view, scale bar 0.2 mm.

Scientific classification
- Kingdom: Animalia
- Phylum: Mollusca
- Class: Gastropoda
- Subclass: Caenogastropoda
- Order: Littorinimorpha
- Family: Caecidae
- Genus: Caecum
- Species: C. johnsoni

Binomial name
- Caecum johnsoni Winkley, 1908

Species of gastropod

Caecum johnsoni, common name the Johnson's caecum, is a species of small sea snail, a marine gastropod mollusk or micromollusk in the family Caecidae.

== Description ==
The maximum recorded shell length is 4.5 mm.

== Habitat ==
Minimum recorded depth is 0 m. Maximum recorded depth is 75 m.
