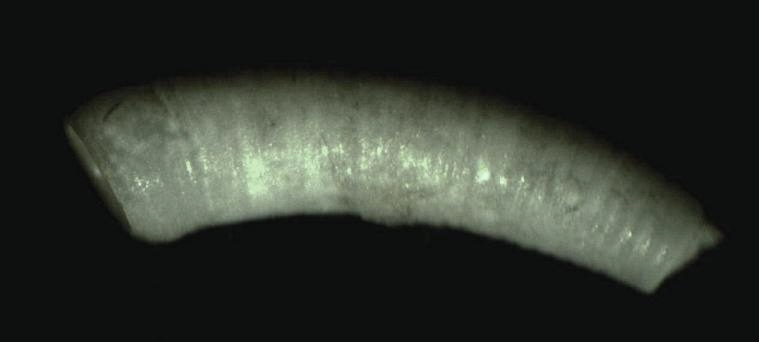
- A shell of Caecum trachea

Scientific classification
- Kingdom: Animalia
- Phylum: Mollusca
- Class: Gastropoda
- Subclass: Caenogastropoda
- Order: Littorinimorpha
- Family: Caecidae
- Genus: Caecum; Fleming, 1817

Type species
- Caecum tracheum tracheum Montagu, G., 1803

Species
- See text

Synonyms
- Brochina Gray, 1857; Brochus T. Brown, 1827; Caecum (Anellum) Carpenter, 1856· accepted, alternate representation; Caecum (Bambusum) Olsson & Harbison, 1954· accepted, alternate representation; Caecum (Brochina) Gray, 1857· accepted, alternate representation; Caecum (Caecum) J. Fleming, 1813· accepted, alternate representation; Caecum (Defolinia) Weisbord, 1962; Caecum (Elephantulum) Carpenter, 1857· accepted, alternate representation; Caecum (Fartulum) Carpenter, 1857· accepted, alternate representation; Coecum [sic]; Cornuoides T. Brown, 1827; Elephantanellum Bartsch, 1920; Elephantulum Carpenter, 1857; Fartulum Carpenter, 1857; Micranellum Bartsch, 1920; Odontidium Philippi, 1836; Pictocaecum Habe, 1978

= Caecum (gastropod) =

Genus of gastropods

Caecum is a genus of minute sea snails, marine gastropod micromolluscs or micromollusks in the family Caecidae or blind shells.

== Distribution ==
This genus occurs worldwide in warm and temperate seas. Many species live in sponges, in sandy spots on reefs, or in grassy beds in shallow waters in bays and lagoons. Some species are very common and can be extremely numerous where they do occur, such as the "beautiful caecum" (Caecum pulchellum), but even they can be easily overlooked as they are so tiny. Many species are considered to be uncommon, but this assessment may be a result of lack of proper sampling.

== Shell description ==
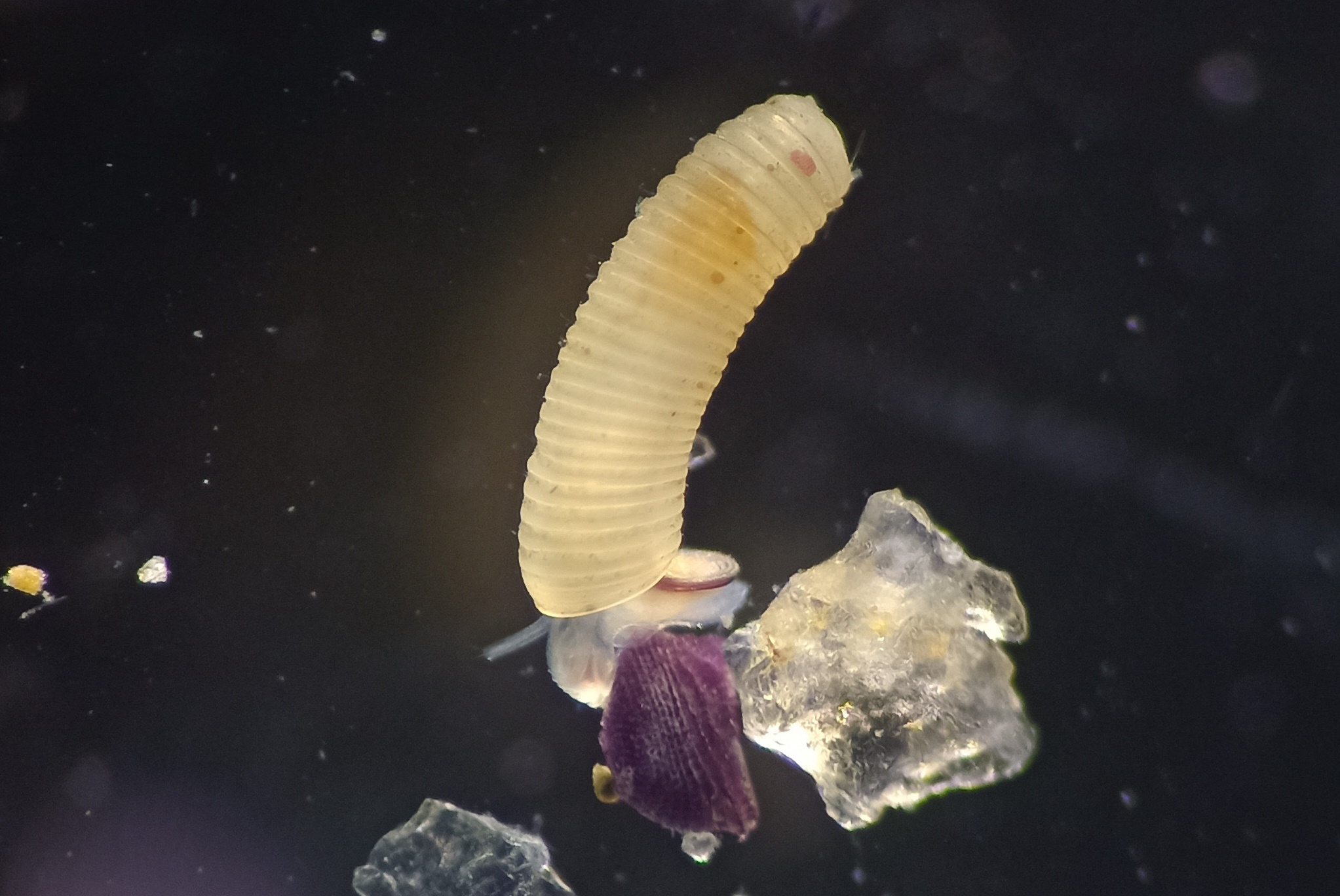
Caecum brasilicum on a sand grain.

The shells in this genus, like the others in the family, are very small with a length between 2 mm and 6 mm. Their colour is white to yellowish white and some are almost translucent. They are unusual in that the teleoconch of the adult shell is a curving tube for most of its length. In the first stage of the shell it is spiral-shaped but soon becomes cylindrical.

The shell is sealed with a permanent calcareous plug at one end and (when the animal has withdrawn into the shell) with a circular, multispiral, horny operculum at the other end, the shell aperture. The sculpture is smooth or consists of a close-set, large number of annular ridges.

== Feeding habits ==
These snails feed on one-celled organisms on sand grains or pebbles.

== Species ==
Species in the genus Caecum include:

- † Caecum aartseni Van Dingenen, Ceulemans & Landau, 2016
- Caecum achirona (de Folin, 1867)
- Caecum adamsi Raines, 2020
- Caecum amputatum Ch. Hedley, 1894
- Caecum amydroglyptum Rehder, 1980
- Caecum angustum de Folin, 1879
- Caecum annulatum Emmons, 1858
- Caecum antillarum Carpenter, 1858 - Antillean caecum
- Caecum arabicum Issel, 1869
- Caecum armoricum de Folin, 1869 - De Folin's lagoon snail. This species is fully protected in the United Kingdom under the Wildlife and Countryside Act 1981 since 1992.
- Caecum atlantidis R. B. Watson, 1897
- Caecum attenuatum de Folin, 1879
- Caecum auriculatum de Folin, 1868
- Caecum austrafricanum Vannozzi, Pizzini & Raines, 2015
- Caecum australe Pizzini & Raines, 2011
- Caecum bathus Pizzini, Raines & Vannozzi, 2013
- † Caecum benhami Goedert & Raines, 2016
- † Caecum bensoni Goedert & Raines, 2016
- Caecum beaufortensis Ward and Blackwelder 1987
- Caecum bimamillatum de Folin, 1867
- Caecum bimarginatum Carpenter, 1859
- Caecum biomaglo Vannozzi, 2023
- Caecum bipartitum de Folin, 1870
- Caecum borneoense de Folin, 1867
- Caecum bounty Pizzini & Raines, 2011
- Caecum brasilicum de Folin, 1874
- Caecum brennani Raines & Pizzini, 2009
- Caecum breve de Folin, 1867
- Caecum bucerium Golikov, 1967
- Caecum californicum Dall, 1885 - California caecum
- Caecum calvertense Martin, 1904
- Caecum campanulatum Raines & Pizzini, 2005
- Caecum campe Pilsbry and Olsson, 1941
- Caecum carolinianum Dall, 1892 - Carolina caecum
- † Caecum carpenteri Deshayes, 1861
- Caecum caverna Moolenbeek, Faber & Iliffe, 1989
- Caecum chilense Stuardo, 1962
- Caecum chinense de Folin, 1879
- Caecum chipolanum Gardner, 1947
- Caecum cinctum Olsson & Harbison, 1953
- Caecum circumvolutum de Folin, 1867
- Caecum clarkii P. P. Carpenter, 1858
- Caecum clarum Lamy, 1910 [ex de Folin MS]
- Caecum clathratum P. P. Carpenter, 1857
- Caecum clava de Folin, 1867 - club caecum
- Caecum cocoense Sibaja-Cordero, García-Méndez & Troncoso, 2013
- Caecum codoceoae Gálvez & Huidobro, 2017
- Caecum condylum Moore, 1969 - bone caecum
- Caecum continens Van der Linden & Moolenbeek, 2000
- Caecum cooki Pizzini & Raines, 2011
- Caecum cooperi S. I. Smith, 1860 - Cooper's Atlantic caecum
- Caecum corrugatulum Carpenter, 1857
- Caecum crassum de Folin, 1870
- Caecum crebricinctum Carpenter, 1864 - many-named caecum
- Caecum crispum A. E. Verrill & Bush, 1900
- Caecum crystallinum de Folin, 1880
- Caecum cubitatum (de Folin, 1868) - smooth caecum
- Caecum cuspidatum Chaster, 1896
- Caecum cycloferum de Folin, 1867 - fatlip caecum
- Caecum dakuwaqa Pizzini, Raines & Vannozzi, 2013
- Caecum dalli Bartsch, 1920
- Caecum danielei Pizzini & Raines, 2011
- Caecum debile A. E. Verrill & Bush, 1900
- Caecum delicatulum A. E. Verrill & Bush, 1900
- Caecum derjugini Golikov, 1967
- Caecum dextroversum P. P. Carpenter, 1858
- Caecum digitulum Hedley, 1904
- Caecum diminutum C. B. Adams, 1852
- Caecum directum Vannozzi, 2019
- Caecum donmoorei Mitchell-Tapping, 1979
- Caecum draperi Raines, 2020
- Caecum dux de Folin, 1871
- Caecum eburneum C. B. Adams, 1852
- Caecum egenum Vannozzi, 2017
- Caecum elegantissimum Carpenter, 1859
- Caecum eliezeri Absalao, 1997
- Caecum elongatum P. P. Carpenter, 1857
- Caecum engli Nofroni, Pizzini, Oliverio, 1997
- Caecum eunoi Nofroni, Pizzini, Oliverio, 1997
- Caecum exile de Folin, 1875
- Caecum farcimen P. P. Carpenter, 1857
- Caecum fijiense Pizzini, Raines & Vannozzi, 2013
- Caecum firmatum C. B. Adams, 1852
- Caecum floridanum Stimpson, 1851 - Florida caecum
- Caecum folini Kisch, 1959
- Caecum frugi Vannozzi, 2019
- Caecum galapagoense Raines, 2020
- Caecum geigeri Pizzini & Raines, 2011
- Caecum glabellum A. Adams, 1868
- Caecum glabriforme Carpenter, 1857
- Caecum glabrum (Montagu, 1803)
- Caecum gofasi Pizzini & Nofroni, 2001
- Caecum granulatum Vannozzi, 2019
- Caecum greensboroense Martin, 1904
- Caecum gulosum Hedley, 1899
- Caecum gurgulio Carpenter, 1858 - windpipe caecum
- Caecum hemphilli Bartsch, 1920
- Caecum heptagonum (Bartsch, 1920)
- Caecum heterochromum Raines & Pizzini, 2005
- Caecum hyalinum Vannozzi, 2022
- Caecum imbricatum Carpenter, 1858 - imbricate caecum
- Caecum incisum Vannozzi, Pizzini & Raines, 2015
- Caecum imperforatum Kanamacher, 1798 (nomen dubium)
- Caecum inclinatum de Folin, 1869
- Caecum infimum de Folin, 1867
- Caecum inflatulum Vannozzi, 2017
- Caecum inflatum de Folin, 1867
- Caecum inhacaense Albano & Pizzini 2011
- Caecum insculptum Carpenter, 1857
- Caecum insularum Moore, 1969
- Caecum intortum Vannozzi, Pizzini & Raines, 2015
- Caecum invisibile Egger & Jörger, 2020
- Caecum iricolor Vannozzi, 2023
- Caecum japonicum (Habe, 1978)
- Caecum johnsoni Winkley, 1908
- Caecum jonatani Espinosa, Ortea & Fernandez-Garcés, 2007
- Caecum jonesae Swinnen & Simone, 2024
- Caecum jucundum de Folin, 1867
- Caecum knysnaense Vannozzi, Pizzini & Raines, 2015
- Caecum kontiki Pizzini & Raines, 2011
- Caecum laeve C.B. Adams, 1852
- Caecum lapita Pizzini, Raines & Vannozzi, 2013
- Caecum laqueatum C. B. Adams, 1852
- † Caecum larieyense Lozouet, Lesport & Renard, 2001
- Caecum leilae Vannozzi, Pizzini & Raines, 2015
- Caecum lightfootanum Raines, 2020
- Caecum limnetes Long, 1972
- Caecum limpidum de Folin, 1874
- Caecum lindae Vannozzi, Pizzini & Raines, 2015
- Caecum lineicinctum de Folin, 1880
- Caecum liratocinctum Carpenter, 1857
- Caecum lohri Strong & Hertlein, 1939
- Caecum loyaltense Pizzini, Raines & Vannozzi, 2013
- Caecum lozoueti Vannozzi & Renda, 2024
- Caecum lucidum de Folin, 1867
- Caecum macrum Van der Linden & Moolenbeek, 2000
- Caecum maestratii Pizzini, Raines & Vannozzi, 2013
- Caecum magellanicum di Geronimo, Privitera & Valdovinos, 1995
- Caecum malleatum de Folin, 1867
- † Caecum mammillatum S. V. Wood, 1848
- Caecum maori Pizzini & Raines, 2006
- Caecum maraisi Vannozzi, Pizzini & Raines, 2015
- Caecum marginatum de Folin, 1869
- Caecum marmoratum de Folin, 1869
- Caecum massambabense Absalao, 1994
- Caecum mauritianum de Folin, 1867
- Caecum metamorphosicum S. Lima, Santos & Absalão, 2013
- Caecum microannulatum Vannozzi & Renda, 2024
- Caecum microstriatum Pizzini, Raines & Vannozzi, 2013
- Caecum miliarium Vannozzi & Renda, 2024
- † Caecum mineuri Lozouet, 1999
- Caecum mirificum de Folin, 1867
- Caecum modestum de Folin, 1867
- Caecum monstrosum C. B. Adams, 1852
- Caecum moorei (Marincovich, 1973)
- Caecum morgan Vannozzi, Pizzini & Raines, 2015
- Caecum multicostatum de Folin, 1867
- Caecum musorstomi Pizzini, Raines & Vannozzi, 2013
- Caecum nasutum Vannozzi, 2019
- † Caecum nemoralis Lozouet, 2015
- Caecum neocaledonicum de Folin, 1867
- Caecum neoguineanum Vannozzi, 2019
- Caecum nofronii Vannozzi, 2019
- Caecum oahuense H. A. Pilsbry, 1921
- Caecum obtusum Carpenter, 1857
- Caecum occidentale (Bartsch, 1920) - western caecum
- Caecum orcutti (Dall, 1885)
- Caecum paradoxum de Folin, 1867
- Caecum parvum C. B. Adams, 1852
- Caecum pascuanum Raines & Pizzini, 2005
- † Caecum pertenuis Laws, 1941
- Caecum planum de Folin, 1874
- Caecum patuxentium Martin, 1904
- Caecum plicatum Carpenter, 1858 - plicate caecum
- Caecum pollicare Carpenter, 1859
- Caecum praegrande Vannozzi, 2017
- Caecum profundicolum Bartsch, 1920 - deepwater caecum
- Caecum properegulare Mansfield, 1925
- Caecum pulchellum Stimpson, 1851 - beautiful caecum
- Caecum pygmaeum C. B. Adams, 1852
- Caecum quadratum P. P. Carpenter, 1857
- Caecum rapanuiense Raines & Pizzini, 2005
- Caecum regulare Carpenter, 1858
- Caecum rehderi Raines & Pizzini, 2005
- Caecum restrictum Vannozzi & Renda, 2024
- Caecum reversum Carpenter, 1857
- Caecum richthofeni A. M. Strong & J. G. Hertlein, 1939
- Caecum rijgersmai Jong & Coomans, 1988
- † Caecum roederi Raines, C. L. Powell & LaFollette, 2023
- Caecum rolani Pizzini & Nofroni, 2001
- Caecum rosanum Bartsch, 1920
- Caecum rostratum de Folin, 1881
- Caecum ruggerii Pizzini, 1997
- Caecum rugulosum Phil, 1836
- Caecum ryssotitum de Folin, 1867 - minute caecum
- Caecum searleswoodii Carpenter, 1859
- Caecum semilaeve Carpenter, 1857
- Caecum senegambianum de Folin, 1870
- Caecum sepimentum de Folin, 1868
- Caecum shaskyi Raines, 2020
- Caecum simplicissimum Thiele, 1925
- Caecum sinuatum de Folin, 1867
- Caecum skoglundae Pizzini, Raines & Nofroni, 2007
- Caecum smriglioi Pizzini, Nofroni & Bonfitto, 2008
- Caecum someri (de Folin, 1867)
- Caecum spiculum Raines, 2020
- Caecum striatum de Folin, 1875
- Caecum strictum de Folin, 1871
- Caecum strigosum de Folin, 1868
- Caecum subannulatum de Folin, 1870
- Caecum subaustrale Stuardo, 1970
- Caecum subconicum Carpenter, 1857
- Caecum subcylindratum Pizzini, Raines & Vannozzi, 2013
- Caecum subflavum de Folin, 1879
- Caecum subimpressum P. P. Carpenter, 1857
- Caecum subobsoletum Carpenter, 1857
- Caecum subornatum de Folin, 1874
- Caecum subspirale Carpenter, 1857
- Caecum subquadratum Carpenter, 1859
- Caecum subspirale Carpenter, 1857
- Caecum subvolutum de Folin, 1874
- Caecum succineum de Folin, 1879
- Caecum swinneni Nofroni, Pizzini, Oliverio, 1997
- Caecum taeniatum de Folin, 1869
- Caecum tahitianum Pizzini & Raines, 2011
- Caecum temporale Vannozzi & Renda, 2024
- Caecum tenue Verrill & Bush, 1900
- Caecum tenuicostatum de Folin, 1881
- Caecum tenuiliratum Carpenter, 1857
- † Caecum tenuistriatum O. Boettger, 1869
- Caecum teres Carpenter, 1857
- Caecum textile de Folin, 1867 - textile caecum
- Caecum tornatum A. E. Verrill & Bush, 1900
- Caecum torquetum de Folin, 1867
- Caecum tortile Dall, 1892 - twisted caecum
- Caecum trachea G. Montagu, 1803
- Caecum trindadense S. Lima, Santos & Absalão, 2013
- Caecum troglodyta Moolenbeek, Faber & Iliffe, 1989
- † Caecum tumidum Carpenter, 1858
- Caecum uncinatum de Folin, 1867
- Caecum undatum P. P. Carpenter, 1857
- Caecum vanuatuarum Pizzini, Raines & Vannozzi, 2013
- Caecum varanoi Pizzini, Nofroni & Bonfitto, 2008
- Caecum variegatum de Folin, 1867
- Caecum venosum de Folin, 1867
- † Caecum verai Moreno, Peñas & Rolán, 2003
- Caecum vertebrale Ch. Hedley, 1899
- Caecum vicinum de Folin, 1870
- Caecum virginiae Pizzini, Raines & Vannozzi, 2013
- Caecum vitreum P. P. Carpenter, 1858
- Caecum wakense Raines & Vannozzi, 2024
- Caecum wami Raines & Pizzini, 2009
- Caecum wayae Pizzini & Nofroni, 2001
- Caecum zaagmani Jong and Coomans, 1988

Subgenera brought into synonymy

- Caecum (Defolinia) Weisbord, 1962: synonym of Caecum Fleming, 1813
- Caecum (Meioceras) Carpenter, 1859: synonym of Meioceras Carpenter, 1859

Species brought into synonymy

- Caecum abnormale Carpenter, 1857: synonym of Caecum subspirale Carpenter, 1857
- Caecum amaltheanum Hedley, 1899: synonym of Mauroceras legumen (Hedley, 1899)
- Caecum amamiense Habe, 1978: synonym of Mauroceras amamiense (Habe, 1978)
- Caecum arcuatum de Folin, 1867 : synonym of Caecum sepimentum de Folin, 1868
- Caecum bahiahondaense A. M. Strong & J. G. Hertlein, 1939 : synonym of Caecum clathratum Carpenter, 1857
- Caecum bakeri (Bartsch, 1920): synonym of Caecum dextroversum Carpenter, 1857
- Caecum berthae Lange de Morretes, 1954: synonym of Caecum plicatum Carpenter, 1858
- Caecum biminicola Pilsbry, 1951: synonym of Caecum plicatum Carpenter, 1858
- Caecum buccina de Folin, 1870: synonym of Caecum circumvolutum de Folin, 1867
- Caecum bucheri Parenzan, 1979: synonym of Filogranula annulata (O. G. Costa, 1861)
- Caecum butoti Jong & Coomans, 1988 : synonym of Caecum marmoratum de Folin, 1869
- Caecum capitanum de Folin, 1874: synonym of Caecum pulchellum Stimpson, 1851
- Caecum carmenense de Folin, 1870: synonym of Caecum circumvolutum de Folin, 1867
- Caecum carpenteri (Bartsch, 1920): synonym of Caecum adamsi Raines, 2020
- Caecum cayoense Rehder, 1943: synonym of Caecum floridanum Stimpson, 1851
- Caecum clenchi Olsson & McGinty, 1958: synonym of Caecum cycloferum de Folin, 1867
- Caecum compactum P. P. Carpenter, 1857 : synonym of Caecum quadratum Carpenter, 1857
- Caecum conjunctum de Folin, 1867: synonym of Caecum pulchellum Stimpson, 1851
- Caecum contractum de Folin, 1870: synonym of Caecum bipartitum de Folin, 1870
- Caecum corneum R. W. Dunker, 1875 : synonym of Caecum ryssotitum de Folin, 1867
- Caecum cornucopiae (Carpenter, 1858) - horn-of-plenty caecum : synonym of Meioceras cornucopiae Carpenter, 1859
- Caecum coronatum de Folin, 1867: synonym of Caecum imbricatum Carpenter, 1858
- Caecum coronellum Dall, 1892: synonym of Caecum cycloferum de Folin, 1867
- Caecum costatum A. E. Verrill, 1872: synonym of Caecum cooperi S. I. Smith, 1860
- Caecum crassicostum Gabb, 1881: synonym of Caecum floridanum Stimpson, 1851
- Caecum curtatum de Folin, 1867: synonym of Caecum pulchellum Stimpson, 1851
- Caecum decussatum de Folin, 1869: synonym of Caecum plicatum Carpenter, 1858
- Caecum dux de Folin, 1871: synonym of Caecum floridanum Stimpson, 1851
- Caecum eburneum de Folin, 1886: synonym of Caecum folini Kisch, 1959
- Caecum elagans Deregaslavtseva, 1891: synonym of Caecum trachea (Montagu, 1803)
- Caecum elegans Perejoslavitseva, 1831 : synonym of Caecum trachea (Montagu, 1803)
- Caecum fasciatum de Folin, 1876: synonym of Caecum trachea (Montagu, 1803)
- Caecum formulosum de Folin, 1869: synonym of Caecum imbricatum Carpenter, 1858
- Caecum fulvum Kisch, 1959: synonym of Caecum neocaledonicum de Folin, 1867
- Caecum heladum Olsson and Harbison, 1953 - fine-line caecum : synonym of Caecum multicostatum de Folin, 1867
- Caecum heterapex T. Habe, 1963 : synonym of Caecum clarum Lamy, 1910
- Caecum hinoidei T. Habe, 1978 : synonym of Caecum neocaledonicum de Folin, 1867
- Caecum insigne de Folin, 1867: synonym of Caecum imbricatum Carpenter, 1858
- Caecum instructum de Folin, 1870: synonym of Caecum bipartitum de Folin, 1870
- Caecum irregulare de Folin, 1867: synonym of Caecum floridanum Stimpson, 1851
- Caecum legumen Hedley, 1904: synonym of Meioceras legumen (Hedley, 1904)
- Caecum leptoglyphos de Folin, 1881: synonym of Caecum textile de Folin, 1867
- Caecum lermondi Dall, 1924: synonym of Meioceras nitidum (Stimpson, 1851)
- Caecum lightfootae Pizzini, Nofroni, Oliverio, 1994 : synonym of Caecum atlantidis Watson, 1897
- Caecum lilianum Ch. Hedley, 1903 : synonym of Caecum sepimentum de Folin, 1867
- Caecum maculatum T. Habe, 1963 : synonym of Caecum sepimentum de Folin, 1867
- Caecum malleatum var. sublaevis de Folin, 1868: synonym of Caecum modestum de Folin, 1868
- Caecum microcyclus de Folin, 1879 : synonym of Caecum attenuatum de Folin, 1880 (subsequent spelling)
- Caecum nitidum Stimpson, 1851 - little horn caecum: synonym of Meioceras nitidum (Stimpson, 1851)
- Caecum obesum A. E. Verrill & Bush, 1900 : synonym of Caecum plicatum Carpenter, 1858
- Caecum orientale de Folin, 1868 : synonym of Caecum clarkii Carpenter, 1859
- Caecum phronimum de Folin, 1867 : synonym of Caecum floridanum Stimpson, 1851
- Caecum puntagordanum Weisbord, 1962: synonym of Caecum floridanum Stimpson, 1851
- Caecum putnamense Mansfield, 1924 : synonym of Caecum johnsoni Winkley, 1908
- Caecum rotundum de Folin, 1868 : synonym of Meioceras nitidum (Stimpson, 1851)
- Caecum saavedrae Beltran, 1965 : synonym of Caecum auriculatum de Folin, 1868
- Caecum sardinianum de Folin, 1869 : synonym of Caecum clarkii Carpenter, 1859
- Caecum sculptum de Folin, 1881: synonym of Caecum imbricatum Carpenter, 1858
- Caecum semitracheum S. Brusina, 1865 : synonym of Caecum clarkii Carpenter, 1859
- Caecum smithi Cooper, 1872: synonym of Caecum cooperi S. Smith, 1860
- Caecum solitarium Oliver, 1915 : synonym of Caecum maori Pizzini & Raines, 2006
- Caecum syriacum de Folin, 1869: synonym of Caecum auriculatum de Folin, 1868
- Caecum tenue A. E. Verrill & Bush, 1900: synonym of Caecum armoricum de Folin, 1869
- Caecum termes Heilprin, 1889: synonym of Caecum plicatum Carpenter, 1858
- Caecum tomaculum (Weisbord, 1962) : synonym of Caecum ryssotitum de Folin, 1867
- Caecum triornatum de Folin, 1870: synonym of Caecum bipartitum de Folin, 1870
- Caecum uvea Pizzini, Raines & Vannozzi, 2013: synonym of Caecum folini Kisch, 1959
- Caecum veracruzanum Collins, 1937 : synonym of Caecum circumvolutum de Folin, 1867
- Caecum vestitum de Folin, 1868 - Vera Cruz caecum: synonym of Caecum circumvolutum de Folin, 1867

Nomina dubia

- Caecum abreviatum de Folin, 1870
- Caecum achates Sykes, 1925: taxon inquirendum
- Caecum bicinctum de Folin, 1870
- Caecum gracile Carpenter, 1858
- Caecum hemisphericum de Folin, 1867
- Caecum imperforatum (Kanmacher, 1798)
