= Caecum verai =

Scientific classification
- Kingdom: Animalia
- Phylum: Mollusca
- Class: Gastropoda
- Subclass: Caenogastropoda
- Order: Littorinimorpha
- Family: Caecidae
- Genus: Caecum
- Species: C. verai

Binomial name
- Caecum verai Moreno, Peñas & Rolán, 2003

Species of gastropod

Caecum verai is a species of minute sea snail, a marine gastropod mollusk or micromollusk in the family Caecidae.
