= Caecum skoglundae =

Scientific classification
- Kingdom: Animalia
- Phylum: Mollusca
- Class: Gastropoda
- Subclass: Caenogastropoda
- Order: Littorinimorpha
- Family: Caecidae
- Genus: Caecum
- Species: C. skoglundae

Binomial name
- Caecum skoglundae Pizzini, Raines & Nofroni, 2007

Species of gastropod

Caecum skoglundae is a species of small sea snail, a marine gastropod mollusc or micromollusc in the family Caecidae.
