= Caecum smriglioi =

Scientific classification
- Kingdom: Animalia
- Phylum: Mollusca
- Class: Gastropoda
- Subclass: Caenogastropoda
- Order: Littorinimorpha
- Family: Caecidae
- Genus: Caecum
- Species: C. smriglioi

Binomial name
- Caecum smriglioi Pizzini, Nofroni & Bonfitto, 2008

Species of gastropod

Caecum smriglioi is a species of small sea snail, a marine gastropod mollusk or micromollusk in the family Caecidae.
