= Caecum macrum =

Scientific classification
- Kingdom: Animalia
- Phylum: Mollusca
- Class: Gastropoda
- Subclass: Caenogastropoda
- Order: Littorinimorpha
- Family: Caecidae
- Genus: Caecum
- Species: C. macrum

Binomial name
- Caecum macrum van der Linden & Moolenbeek, 2000

Species of gastropod

Caecum macrum is a species of minute sea snail, a marine gastropod mollusk or micromollusk in the family Caecidae.
