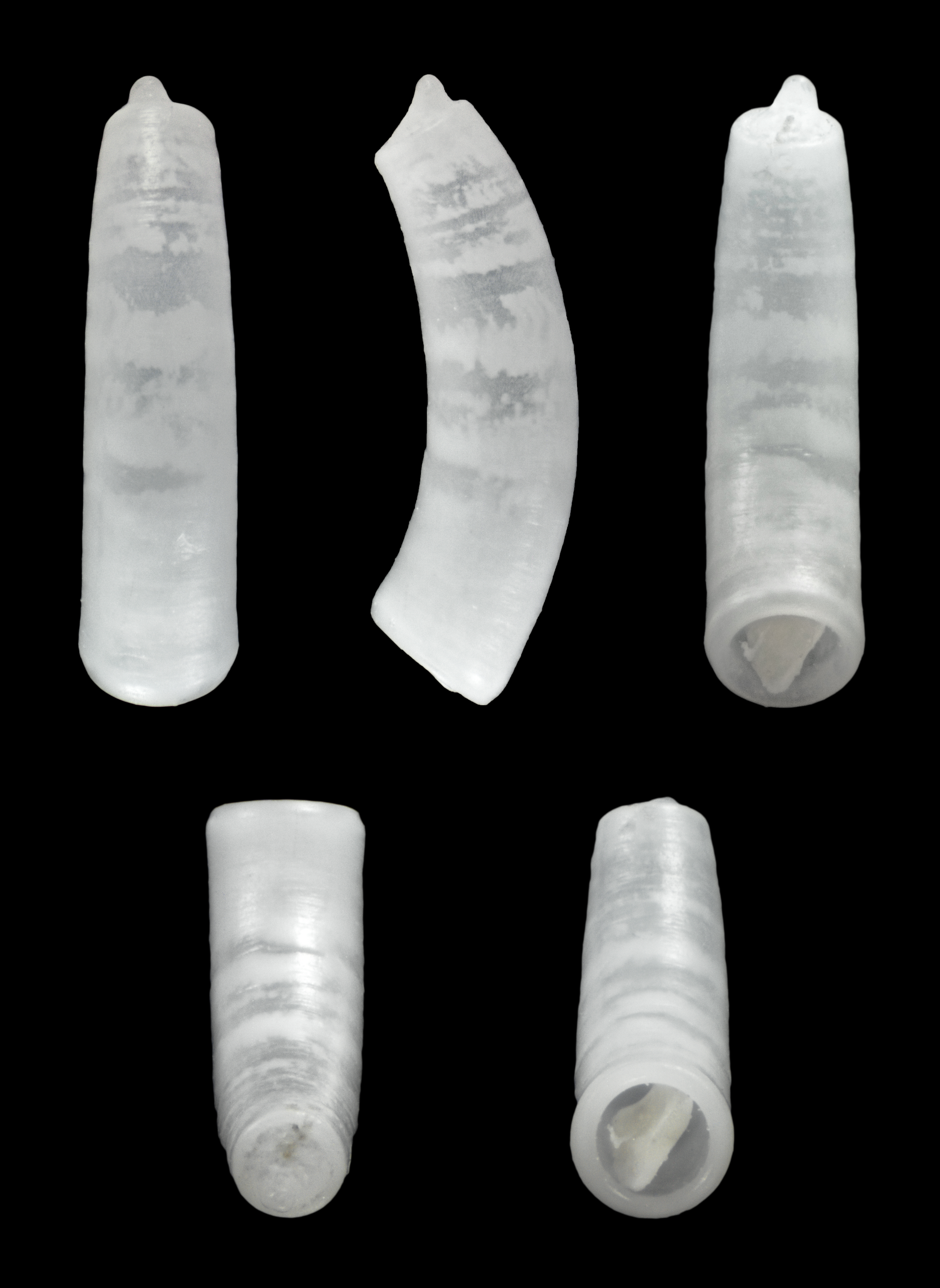

Scientific classification
- Kingdom: Animalia
- Phylum: Mollusca
- Class: Gastropoda
- Subclass: Caenogastropoda
- Order: Littorinimorpha
- Family: Caecidae
- Genus: Caecum
- Species: C. vitreum

Binomial name
- Caecum vitreum (Carpenter, 1859)

= Caecum vitreum =

Species of gastropod

Caecum vitreum is a species of small sea snail, a marine gastropod mollusk or micromollusk in the family Caecidae.

== Distribution ==
The Caecum vitreum has been seen in Galicia, Spain and in the Canary Islands.
