= Caecum wayae =

Scientific classification
- Kingdom: Animalia
- Phylum: Mollusca
- Class: Gastropoda
- Subclass: Caenogastropoda
- Order: Littorinimorpha
- Family: Caecidae
- Genus: Caecum
- Species: C. wayae

Binomial name
- Caecum wayae Pizzini & Nofroni, 2001

Species of gastropod

Caecum wayae is a species of minute sea snail, a marine gastropod mollusk or micromollusk in the family Caecidae.
