= Caecum carolinianum =

Scientific classification
- Kingdom: Animalia
- Phylum: Mollusca
- Class: Gastropoda
- Subclass: Caenogastropoda
- Order: Littorinimorpha
- Family: Caecidae
- Genus: Caecum
- Species: C. carolinianum

Binomial name
- Caecum carolinianum Dall, 1892

Species of gastropod

Caecum carolinianum is a species of minute sea snail, a marine gastropod mollusk or micromollusk in the family Caecidae.

== Description ==
The maximum recorded shell length is 4.75 mm.

== Habitat ==
Minimum recorded depth is 7 m. Maximum recorded depth is 37 m.
