= Caecum digitulum =

Scientific classification
- Kingdom: Animalia
- Phylum: Mollusca
- Class: Gastropoda
- Subclass: Caenogastropoda
- Order: Littorinimorpha
- Family: Caecidae
- Genus: Caecum
- Species: C. digitulum

Binomial name
- Caecum digitulum Hedley, 1904

Species of gastropod

Caecum digitulum is a species of small sea snail, a marine gastropod mollusc or micromollusc in the family Caecidae.
