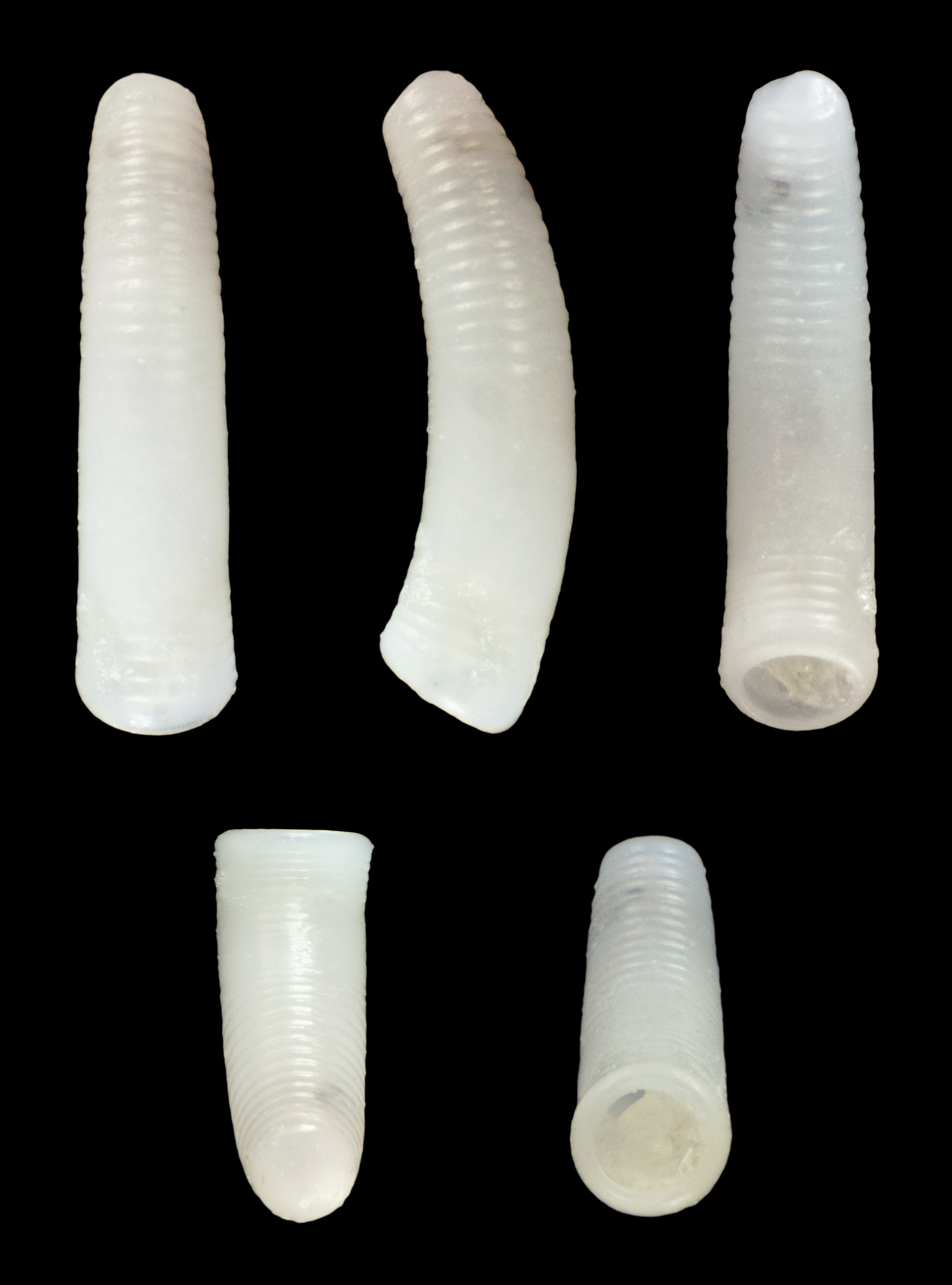

Scientific classification
- Kingdom: Animalia
- Phylum: Mollusca
- Class: Gastropoda
- Subclass: Caenogastropoda
- Order: Littorinimorpha
- Family: Caecidae
- Genus: Caecum
- Species: C. atlantidis

Binomial name
- Caecum atlantidis Watson, 1897

= Caecum atlantidis =

Species of gastropod

Caecum atlantidis is a species of small sea snail, a marine gastropod mollusk or micromollusk in the family Caecidae.
