= Caecum clarkii =

Scientific classification
- Kingdom: Animalia
- Phylum: Mollusca
- Class: Gastropoda
- Subclass: Caenogastropoda
- Order: Littorinimorpha
- Family: Caecidae
- Genus: Caecum
- Species: C. clarkii

Binomial name
- Caecum clarkii Carpenter, 1859

Synonyms
- Caecum orientale de Folin, 1868 (dubious synonym); Caecum sardinianum de Folin, 1870; Caecum semitracheum Monterosato, 1884; Caecum vitreum var. clarkii Carpenter, 1859 (basionym)

Species of gastropod

Caecum clarkii is a species of small sea snail, a marine gastropod mollusk or micromollusk in the family Caecidae.

== Description ==
The shell size varies between 1 mm and 2 mm

== Distribution ==
This species is distributed in European waters from the Netherlands to the Azores; in the Mediterranean Sea.
