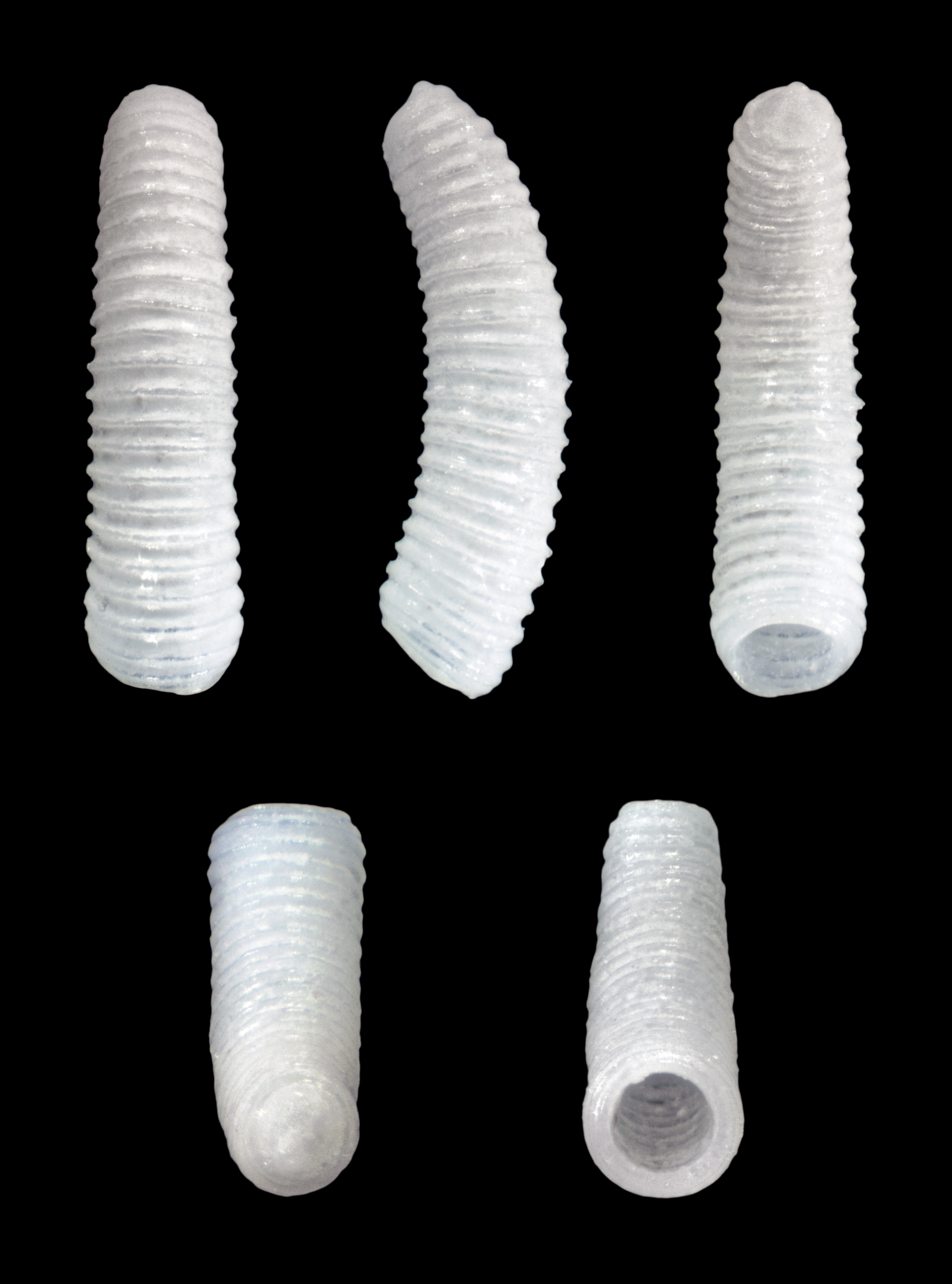

Scientific classification
- Kingdom: Animalia
- Phylum: Mollusca
- Class: Gastropoda
- Subclass: Caenogastropoda
- Order: Littorinimorpha
- Family: Caecidae
- Genus: Caecum
- Species: C. pulchellum

Binomial name
- Caecum pulchellum Stimpson, 1851

= Caecum pulchellum =

Beautiful caecum

Species of gastropod

Caecum pulchellum, common name the beautiful caecum, is a species of small sea snail, a marine gastropod mollusk or micromollusk in the family Caecidae.

== Description ==
The maximum recorded shell length is 4.5 mm.

== Habitat ==
Minimum recorded depth is 0.3 m. Maximum recorded depth is 101 m.
