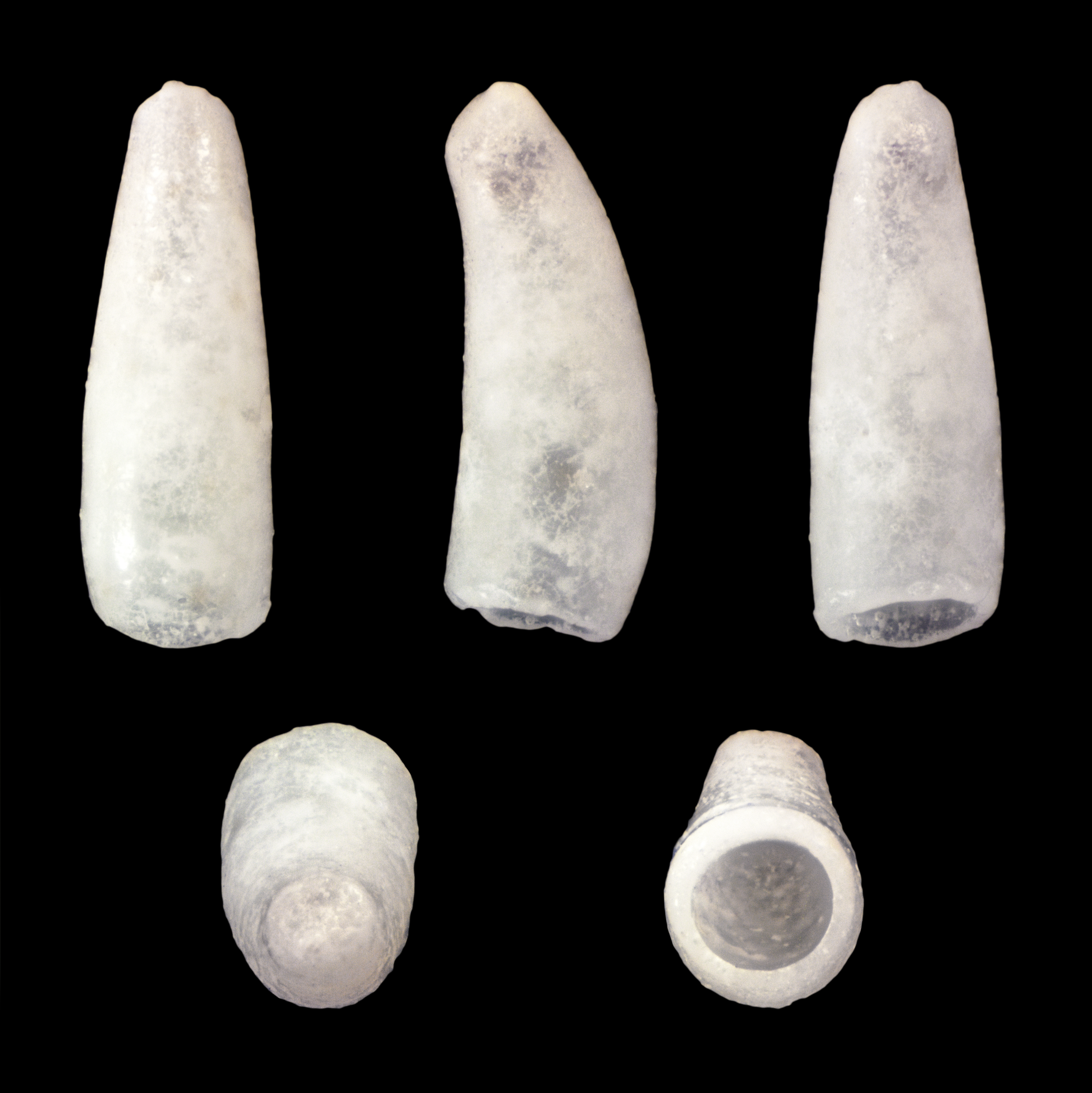

Scientific classification
- Kingdom: Animalia
- Phylum: Mollusca
- Class: Gastropoda
- Subclass: Caenogastropoda
- Order: Littorinimorpha
- Family: Caecidae
- Genus: Meioceras
- Species: M. nitidum

Binomial name
- Meioceras nitidum (Stimpson, 1851)

= Meioceras nitidum =

Species of gastropod

Meioceras nitidum is a species of small sea snail, a marine gastropod mollusk or micromollusk in the family Caecidae.

== Distribution ==
Western Atlantic: North America.

== Description ==
The maximum recorded shell length is 3.1 mm.

== Habitat ==
Minimum recorded depth is 0 m. Maximum recorded depth is 24 m.
