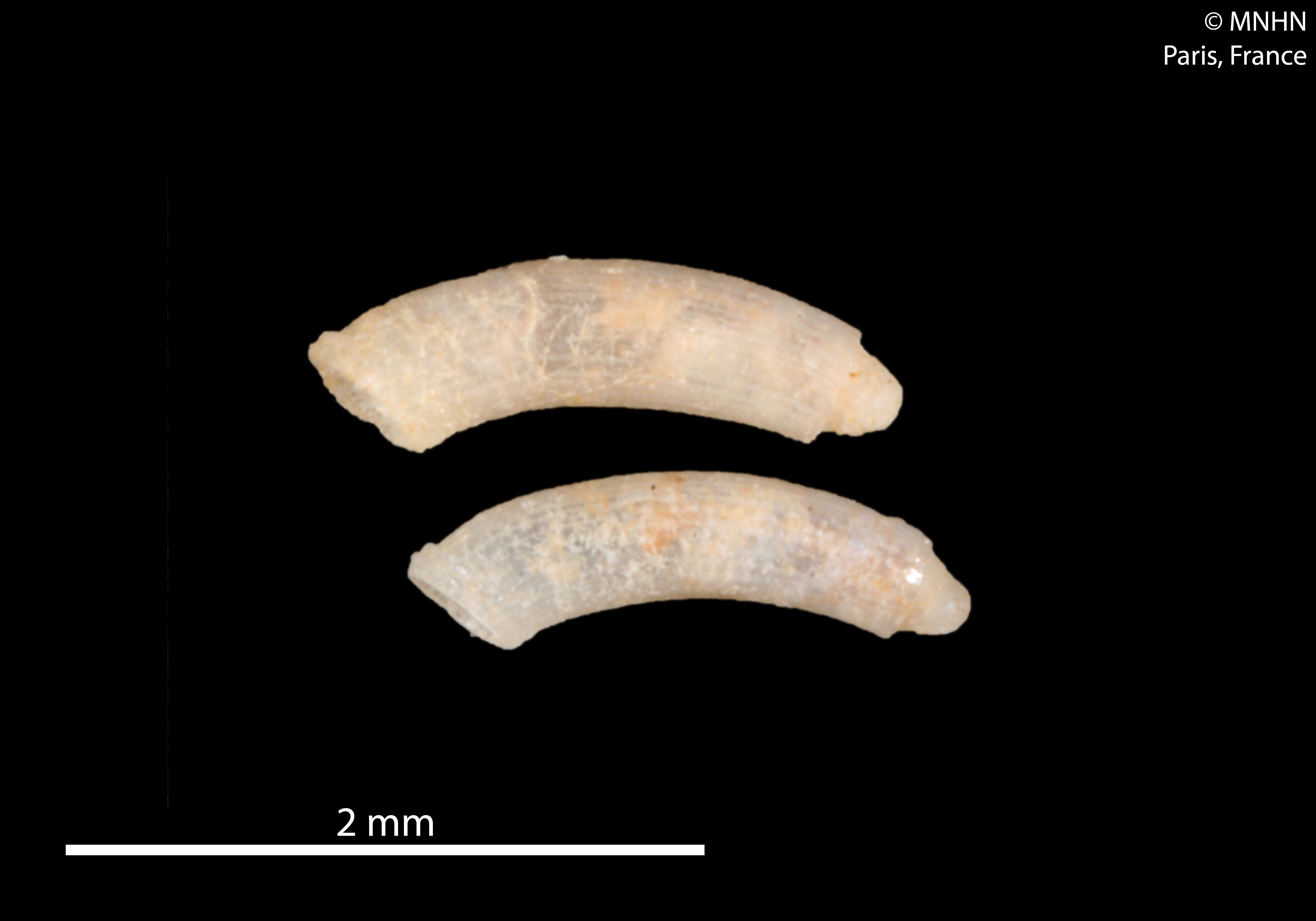
- Shell of Caecum wami (paratype at MNHN, Paris)

Scientific classification
- Kingdom: Animalia
- Phylum: Mollusca
- Class: Gastropoda
- Subclass: Caenogastropoda
- Order: Littorinimorpha
- Family: Caecidae
- Genus: Caecum
- Species: C. wami

Binomial name
- Caecum wami Raines & Pizzini, 2009

= Caecum wami =

Species of gastropod

Caecum wami is a species of minute sea snail, a marine gastropod mollusk or micromollusk in the family Caecidae.

== Distribution ==
This marine species occurs off Northwestern Australia.
