= Léopold de Folin =

French zoologist, author and oceanographer

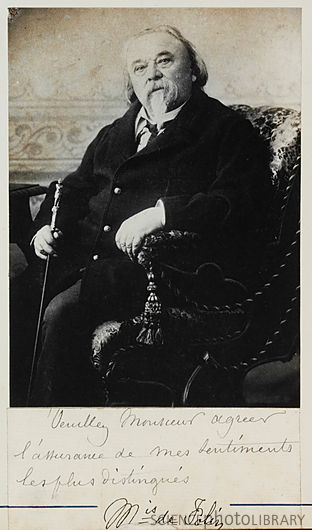
- Born: 28 August 1817; Tournus, Saône-et-Loire
- Died: 5 July 1896 (aged 78); Biarritz, Pyrénées-Atlantiques
- Scientific career
- Fields: Oceanography, malacology
- Author abbrev. (zoology): Folin

Léopold de Folin (French pronunciation: [leɔpɔl(d) də fɔlɛ̃]; Alexandre Guillaume Léopold de, Marquis de Folin, 28 August 1817 – 5 July 1896) was an author, oceanographer, malacologist and early founder (1871) of the collections which were to become the Musée de la mer (sea museum) in Biarritz, France

De Folin wrote on Caecidae for the reports published following the Challenger expedition of 1872–1876.

With Henri Milne-Edwards's son Alphonse, de Folin carried out a survey of the Gulf of Gascony. He worked on board the Travailleur (a paddle-wheel aviso) in 1880, and on board the Talisman in 1883, for trips to the Canary Islands, the Cape Verde Islands and the Azores.

De Folin also described the genus Oceanida of sea snails in the family Eulimidae.

== Relatives ==
Léopold de Folin was the brother-in-law of the French naturalist Pierre Marie Arthur Morelet, through his marriage with Morelet's sister Noémie.

== Books ==
- Les Batysiphons (premières pages d'une monographie du genre) in Actes de la société Linnéenne de Bordeaux. Deloynes - J. Perez - Paul Brunaud - Abbé Letu - E. Simon - P. Fischer - P. De Loynes - Marquis DE FOLIN - Fernand Lataste - Louis Petit - E. Benoist - J. T. Billiot - P. Fischer - E. Duregne, 1886.
- Les Fonds de la Mer, études internationale sur les particularités nouvelles des régions sous-marines. De Folin, L. & Périer, L., 1867–1887. (in French)
- Sous les mers. Campagne d'explorations du "travailleur" et du "talisman". Avec 45 figures intercalées dans le texte. Paris, Librairie J.B. Baillière et fils, 1887 (in French).
- Pêches et chasses zoologiques. Avec 117 figures dessinées par l'auteur et intercalées dans le texte. Paris, Baillière, 1893 (in French)
- Other books on Amazon.com

== Tributes ==
The sea snail genus Folinella was named after de Folin.

An exposition room dedicated to oceanography in the Musée de la mer in Biarritz, France, bears his name.
