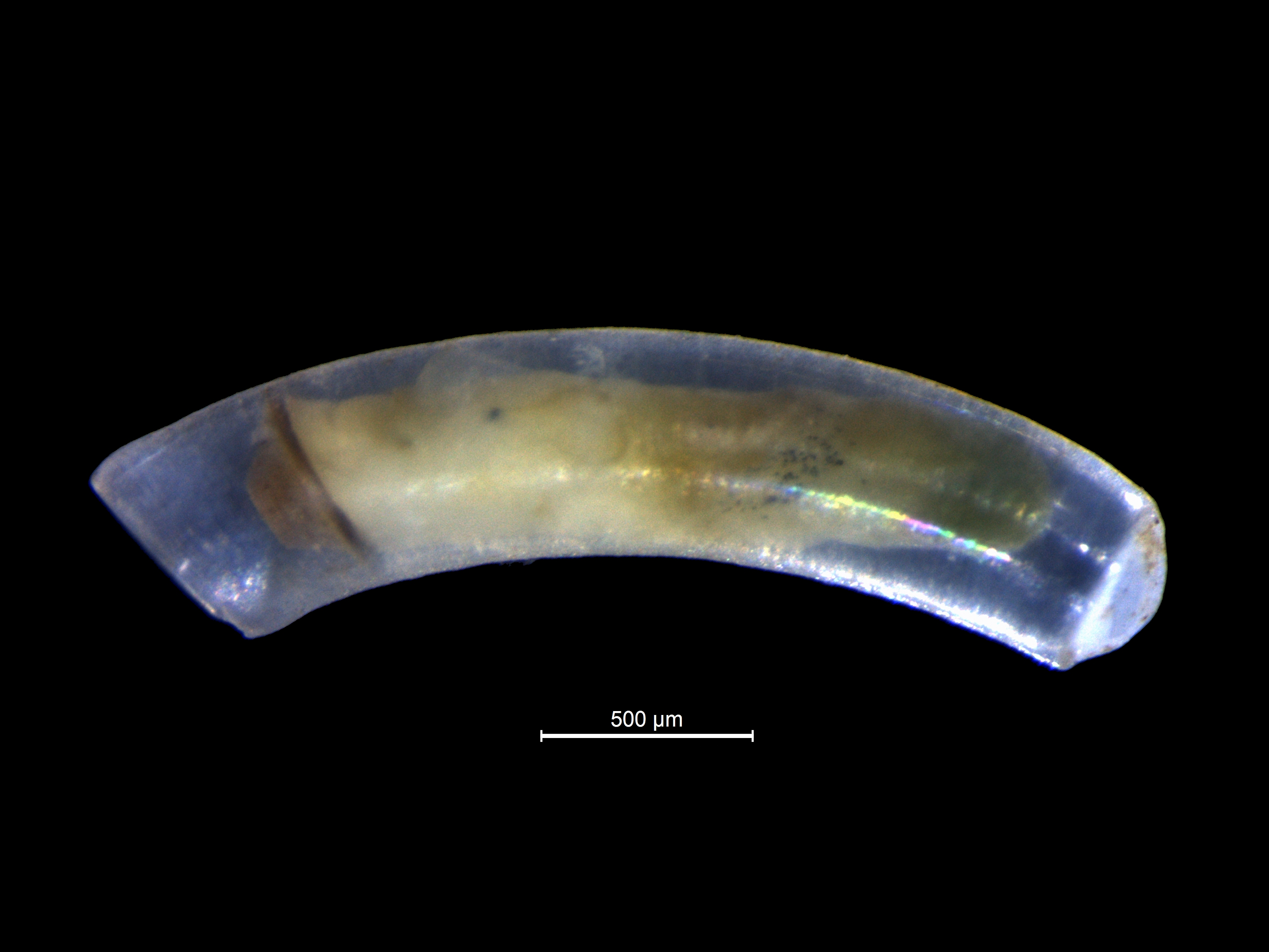
- Caecum glabrum
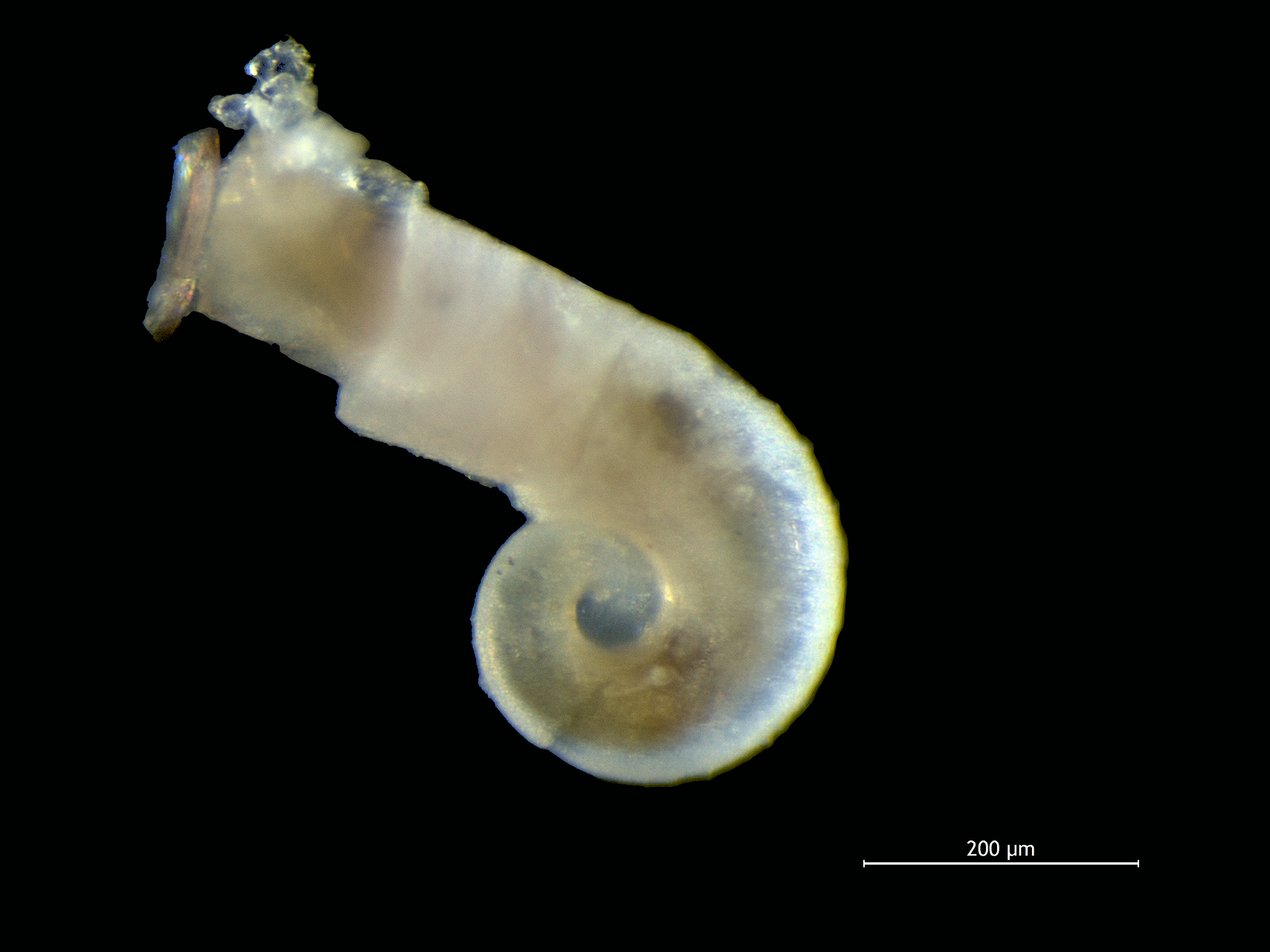
- Juvenile showing protoconch

Scientific classification
- Kingdom: Animalia
- Phylum: Mollusca
- Class: Gastropoda
- Subclass: Caenogastropoda
- Order: Littorinimorpha
- Superfamily: Truncatelloidea
- Family: Caecidae; Gray, 1850

Genera
- See text

= Caecidae =

Family of gastropods

Caecidae is a taxonomic family of minute sea snails or micromolluscs, marine gastropod molluscs in the order Littorinimorpha.

== Habitat ==
These minute tubular shells can be found living in marine sediment, or among algae or sponges, in warm and temperate seas.

== Shell description ==
The shells in this family are unusual in that the adult shell is a curving tube. In the subfamily Caecinae the protoconch is lost, and the tube is sealed with a permanent calcareous plug at one end. In the subfamilies Ctiloceratinae and Strebloceratinae the protoconch is retained. At the other end, the tube is sealed by a circular operculum. The spiral part is almost always lost when outgrowing the juvenile stage. The color of the shell is white to pale yellow.

== Taxonomy ==
This family contains three subfamilies:

- Caecinae Gray, 1850
- Ctiloceratinae Iredale & Laseron, 1957
- Strebloceratinae Bandel, 1996

== Genera ==
WoRMS lists the following genera:

=== Caecinae ===
- Caecum Fleming, 1813
- Mauroceras Vannozzi, 2019
- Meioceras Carpenter, 1859
- Pizzinia Vannozzi, 2017

=== Ctiloceratinae ===
- Ctiloceras R. B. Watson, 1886
- Enigmerces Iredale & Laseron, 1957
- Jayella Iredale & Laseron, 1957
- Parastrophia de Folin, 1869
- Ponderoceras Bandel, 1996

=== Strebloceratinae ===
- Strebloceras Carpenter 1859

=== Genera brought into synonymy ===
- Brochina Gray, 1857: synonym of Caecum Fleming, 1813
- Brochus T. Brown, 1827: synonym of Caecum Fleming, 1813
- Caecalium J. Fleming, 1822: synonym of Caecum Fleming, 1813
- Carinocera Iredale & Laseron, 1957: synonym of Ctiloceras R. B. Watson, 1886
- Coecum: synoym of Caecum Fleming, 1813 (misspelling)
- Cornuoides T. Brown, 1827: synonym of Caecum Fleming, 1813
- Elephantanellum Bartsch, 1920: synonym of Caecum Fleming, 1813
- Elephantellum: misspelling of Elephantanellum, synonym of Caecum Fleming, 1813
- Fartulum P. P. Carpenter, 1857: synonym of Caecum Fleming, 1813
- Gladioceras Iredale & Laseron, 1957 synonym of Parastrophia de Folin, 1869
- Micranellum Bartsch 1900: synonym of Caecum Fleming, 1813
- Mioceras Cossmann, 1912: synonym of Meioceras Carpenter, 1859
- Moreletia de Folin, 1869: synonym of Parastrophia de Folin, 1869
- Odontidium Philippi, 1836: synonym of Caecum Fleming, 1813
- Pedumicra Iredale & Laseron, 1957: synonym of Parastrophia de Folin, 1869
- Phleboceras de Folin, 1868: synonym of Strebloceras Carpenter, 1859
- Pictocaecum Habe 1978: synonym of Caecum Fleming, 1813
- Spirolidium O. G. Costa, 1861: synonym of Parastrophia de Folin, 1869
- Torresella Iredale & Laseron, 1957/: synonym of Ctiloceras R. B. Watson, 1886
- Transcopia Iredale & Laseron, 1957: synonym of Ctiloceras R. B. Watson, 1886
- Watsonia de Folin, 1880: synonym of Parastrophia de Folin, 1869
