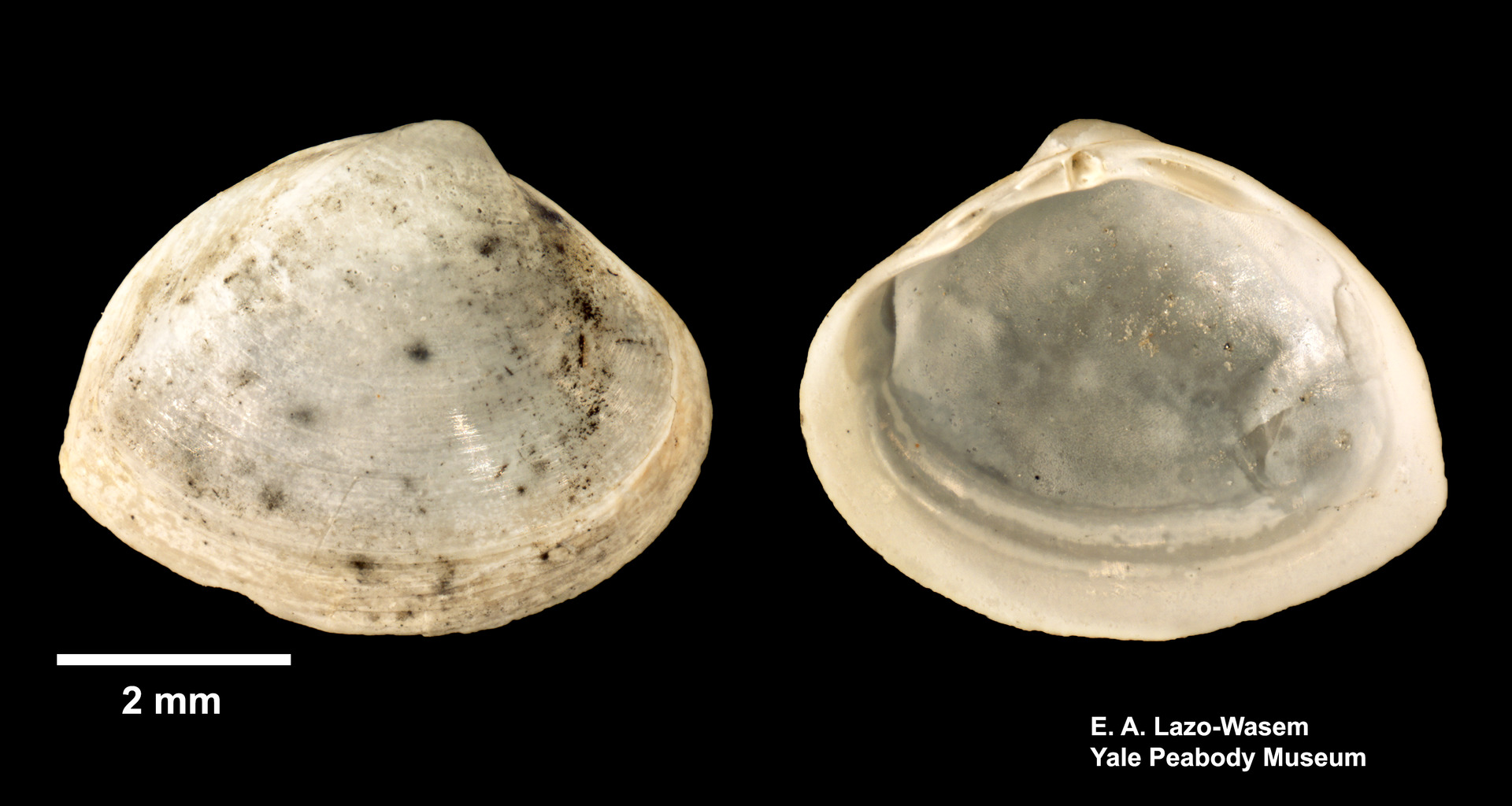

Scientific classification
- Kingdom: Animalia
- Phylum: Mollusca
- Class: Bivalvia
- Order: Venerida
- Family: Mactridae
- Subfamily: Mactrinae
- Genus: Mulinia
- Species: M. lateralis

Binomial name
- Mulinia lateralis (Say, 1822)

Synonyms
- Mactra lateralis Say, 1822; Mactra rostrata Philipp, 1849

= Mulinia lateralis =

Species of bivalve

Mulinia lateralis, the dwarf surf clam or coot clam, is a species of small saltwater clam, a bivalve mollusc in the family Mactridae. It occurs in the western Atlantic Ocean and the Caribbean Sea.

== Description ==
Mulinia lateralis has a somewhat inflated triangular shell, with valves that are thin but not brittle. The shell reaches 15 mm in adult size. The anterior end of the shell is rounded, but the posterior end has a distinctive radial ridge giving it an angular look. The outer surface is white or yellowish and somewhat glossy, covered with fine concentric sculpturing. The beaks are prominent and are slightly angled towards the anterior end. The hinge has a small chondrophore, and the ligament joining the valves is internal. The inner surface of the valves is glossy white.

== Distribution ==
Mulinia lateralis is found on the eastern coasts of North America from the north-eastern United States (New Jersey) southwards to Mexico. It lives shallowly buried in sand or mud on the lower shore and in the sublittoral zone. It is tolerant of low salinities and is found in estuaries and lagoons. It is sometimes abundant, and as many as 21,000 individuals have been found in a square metre.

== Biology ==
Mulinia lateralis is a filter feeder. The diet is mainly bacteria or other planktonic material. Like other bivalve molluscs, the animal raises its siphons to the surface of the sediment, draws water in though one and expels it through the other, having filtered out nutrient particles in the gills.

The sexes are separate in Mulinia lateralis. The female produces up to 2 million eggs at a time, and fertilisation is external. The veliger larvae disperse as part of the zooplankton and take from 1 to 3 weeks to develop into the pediveliger stage, whereupon they settle and undergo metamorphosis. The juveniles grow fast and are sexually mature within 2 months.

== Ecology ==
A number of different animals prey on Mulinia lateralis. These include birds such as the sanderling and laughing gull and crabs. The gray sea star (Luidia clathrata) selectively feeds on it and the knobbed whelk (Busycon carica) is also a major predator.

In addition to a variety of salinities, Mulinia lateralis is able to tolerate other ecologically stressful conditions like temperature extremes and anoxia. Mulinia lateralis has been found in the European wadden sea, and has the potential to become an invasive alien species due to its high fecundity, short generation cycle of just 60 days, and broad ecological amplitudes.
