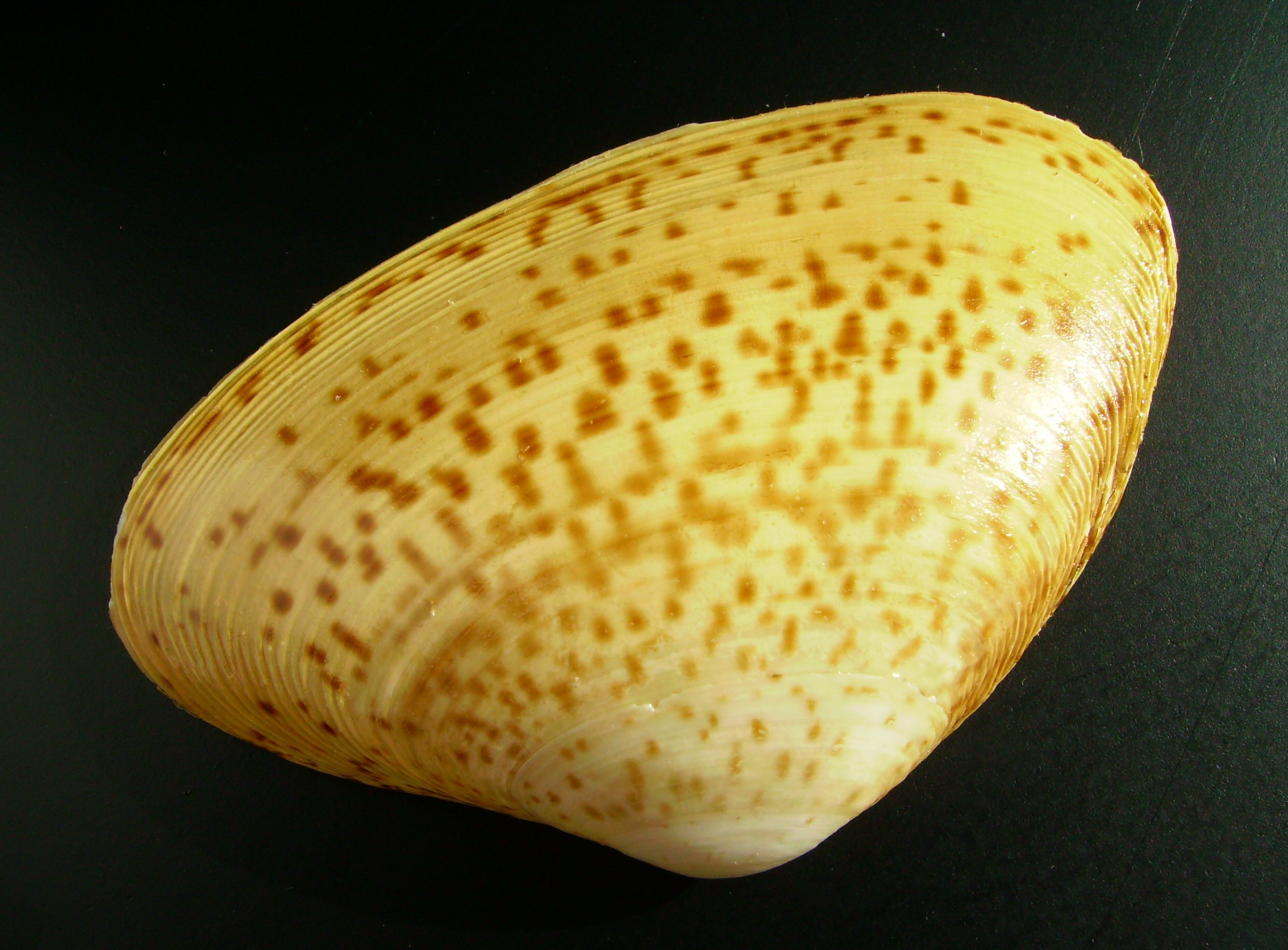

Scientific classification
- Kingdom: Animalia
- Phylum: Mollusca
- Class: Bivalvia
- Order: Venerida
- Family: Mactridae
- Genus: Oxyperas
- Species: O. elongatum

Binomial name
- Oxyperas elongatum (Quoy and Gaimard, 1835)

Synonyms
- Longimactra elongata (Quoy & Gaimard, 1835) superseded combination; †Longimactra elongata komakoensis R. M. Carter, 1972 junior subjective synonym; Mactra elongata Quoy & Gaimard, 1835 superseded combination; Mactra mariae A. Adams, 1856 junior subjective synonym; Mulinia notata F. W. Hutton, 1873 junior subjective synonym; Oxyperas elongata (Quoy & Gaimard, 1835) wrong grammatical agreement of the species epithet

= Oxyperas elongatum =

Species of bivalve

Oxyperas elongatum, the long trough shell (Māori: tohemanga or poua), is a species of large bivalve mollusc in the family Mactridae. It is endemic to New Zealand and found throughout the country.

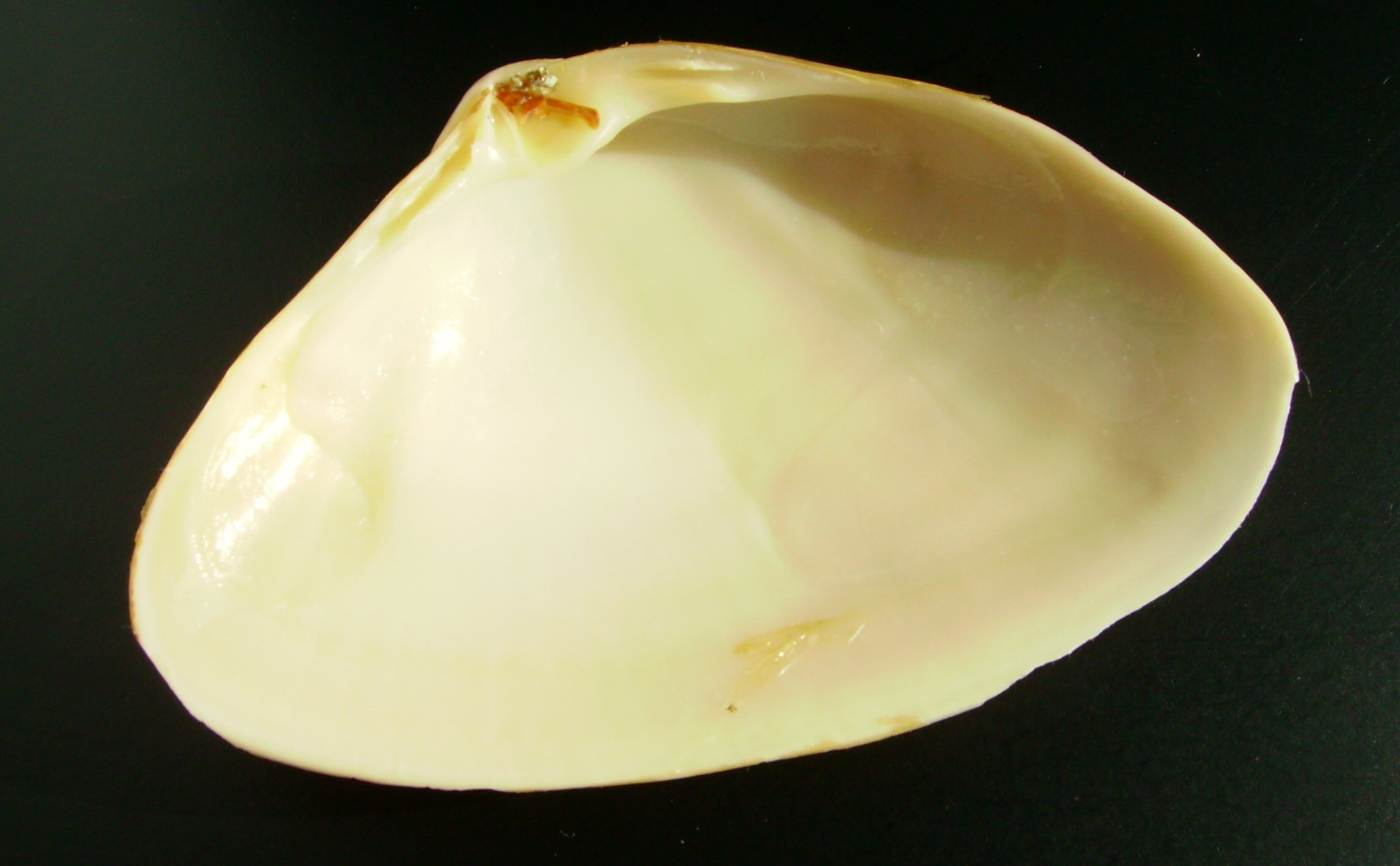
Oxyperas elongatum inside view
