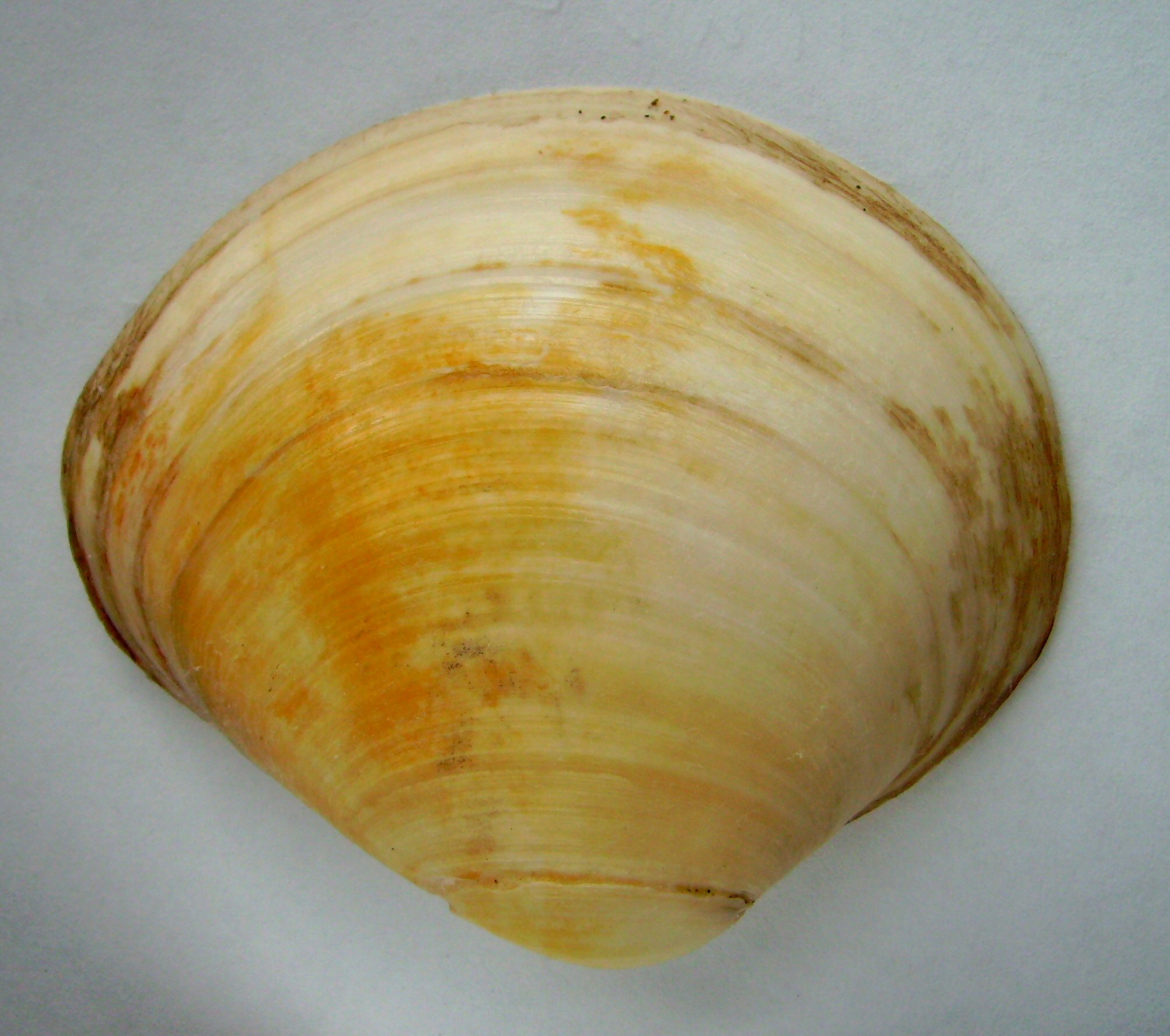

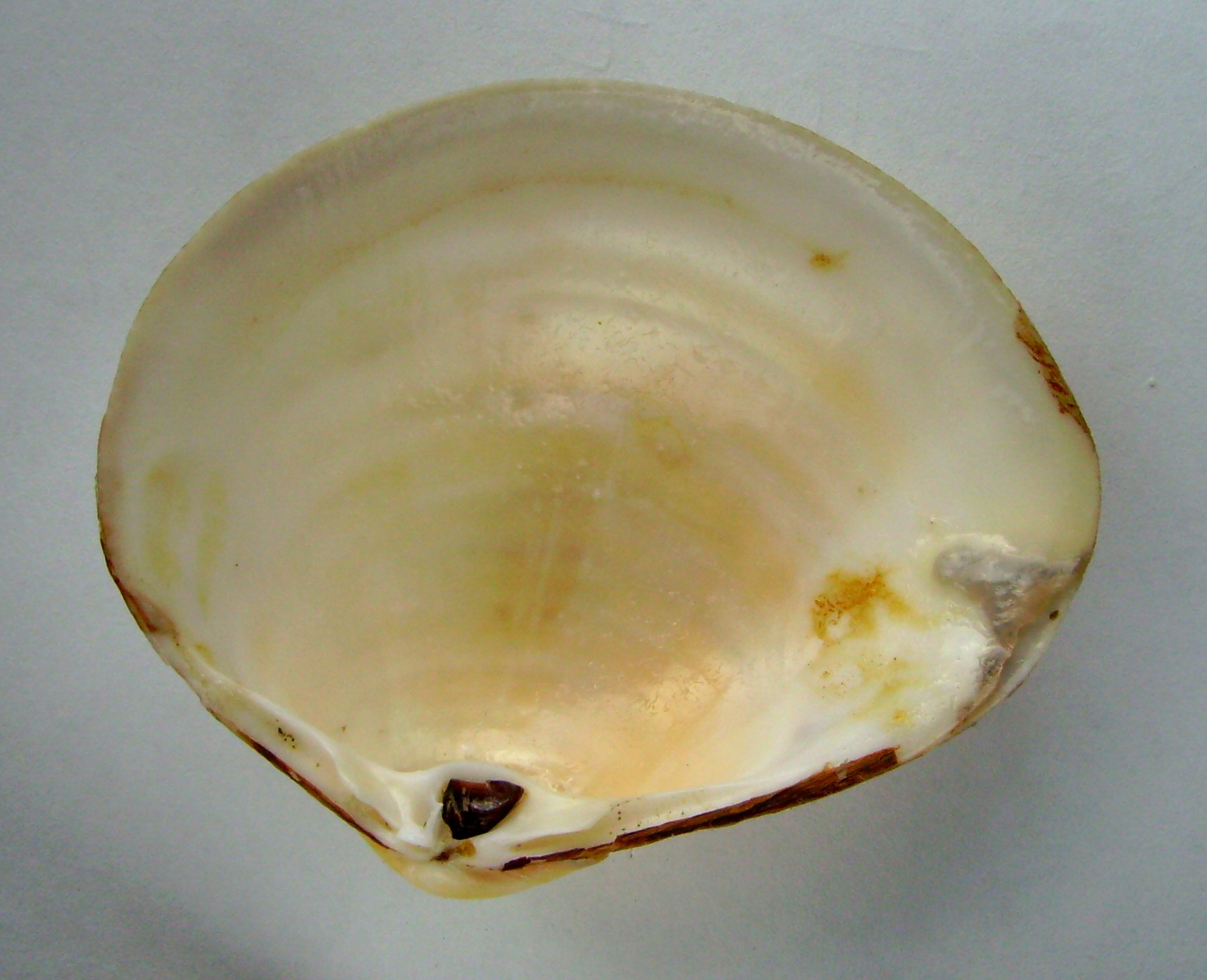

Scientific classification
- Kingdom: Animalia
- Phylum: Mollusca
- Class: Bivalvia
- Order: Venerida
- Family: Mactridae
- Subfamily: Mactrinae
- Genus: Cyclomactra
- Species: C. ovata

Binomial name
- Cyclomactra ovata (Gray, 1843)

Synonyms
- Mactra deluta Gould, 1850; Mactra inflata Hutton, 1873; Mactra lavata Hutton, 1885; Spisula ovata Gray, 1843; Standella aequalis Webster, 1905; Standella inflata (Hutton, 1873)

= Cyclomactra ovata =

Species of bivalve

Cyclomactra ovata is a species of marine bivalve in the family Mactridae. It is endemic to New Zealand.
