= Cyclomactra =

Scientific classification
- Kingdom: Animalia
- Phylum: Mollusca
- Class: Bivalvia
- Order: Venerida
- Family: Mactridae
- Subfamily: Mactrinae
- Genus: Cyclomactra; Dall, 1895

Type species
- Mactra tristis Reeve, 1854

Species
- C. ovata (Gray, 1843); C. tristis (Reeve, 1854)

Synonyms
- Mactra (Cyclomactra) Dall, 1895

Genus of bivalves

Cyclomactra is a genus of marine bivalves in the family Mactridae. It includes two species, both endemic to New Zealand.

== Species ==
The genus Cyclomactra includes two species:

- Cyclomactra ovata (Gray, 1843)
- Cyclomactra tristis (Reeve, 1854)
