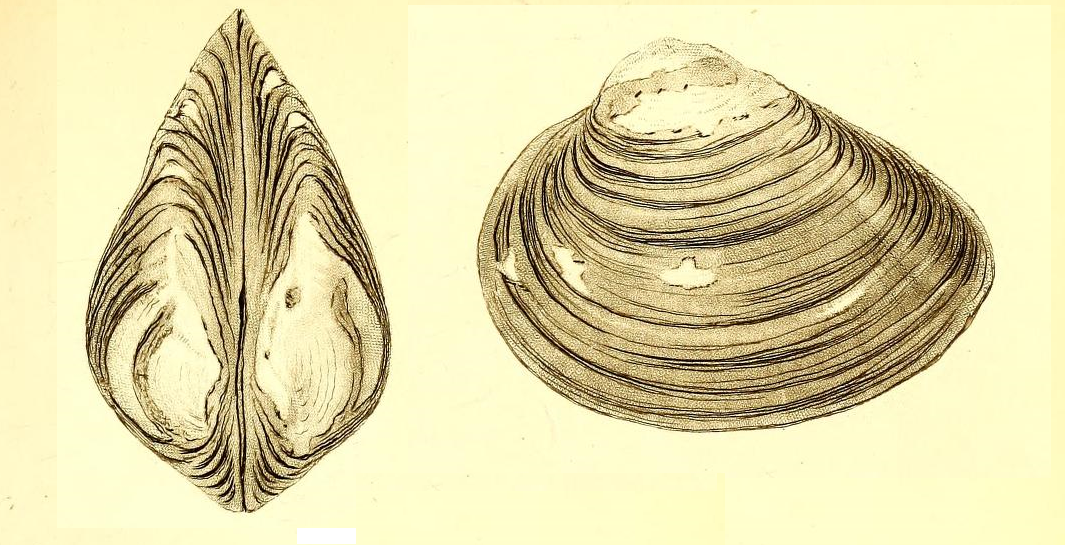

Scientific classification
- Kingdom: Animalia
- Phylum: Mollusca
- Class: Bivalvia
- Order: Venerida
- Family: Mactridae
- Genus: Rangia
- Species: R. cuneata

Binomial name
- Rangia cuneata (G. B. Sowerby I, 1832)

Synonyms
- Gnathodon cuneatus G. B. Sowerby I, 1832; Gnathodon cuneatus nasutus Dall, 1884; Gnathodon nasutus Dall, 1884; Rangia cyrenoides Des Moulins, 1832

= Rangia cuneata =

Species of clam

Rangia cuneata or Atlantic rangia, also known as wedge clam, gulf wedge clam, common rangia, and cocktail clam, is a mollusc native to the Gulf of Mexico. It is an oval clam with a body length of up to 5 cm, living from the intertidal zone to depths of 124 meters. It is edible and is harvested for food in Mexico, and has been so since pre-Hispanic times.

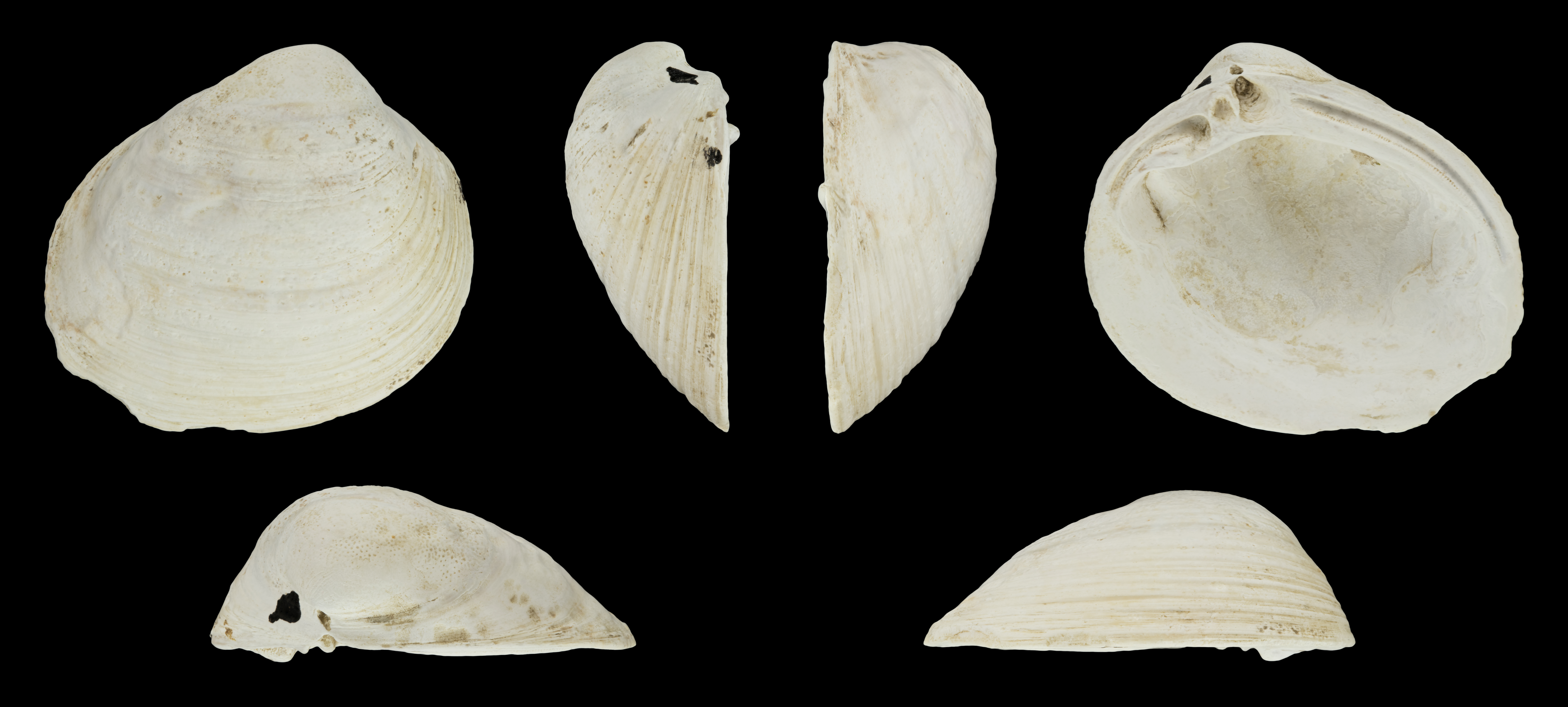
Right valve

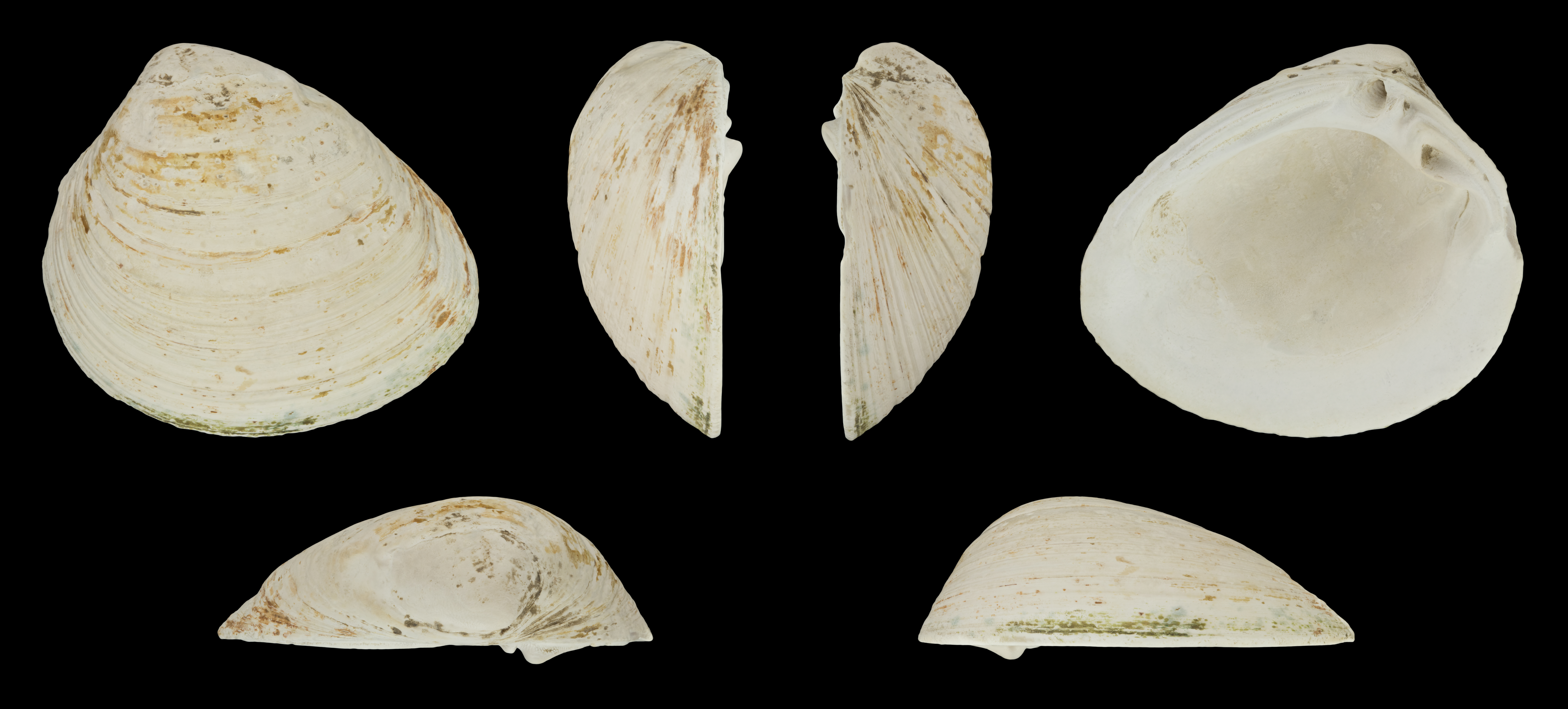
Left valve

== Invasive species ==
Atlantic rangia have been documented as an invasive species in the US North Atlantic coast, Belgium (Antwerp), The Netherlands, the Baltic Sea, and Norway. They was likely introduced with oyster shipments or as larvae though ballast water.
