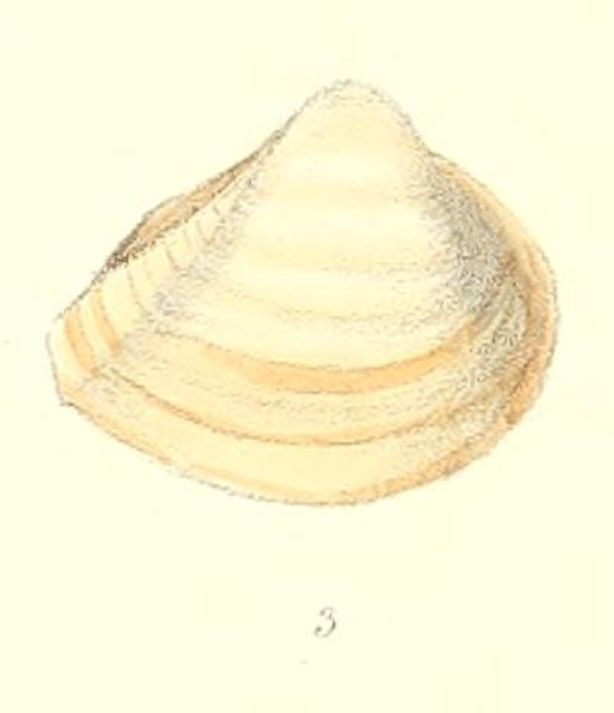

Scientific classification
- Kingdom: Animalia
- Phylum: Mollusca
- Class: Bivalvia
- Order: Venerida
- Family: Mactridae
- Genus: Mulinia
- Species: M. cleryana

Binomial name
- Mulinia cleryana (d'Orbigny, 1846)

Synonyms
- Gnathodon cantrainei G. B. Sowerby II, 1873; Mactra carinulata Reeve, 1854; Mactra cleryana d'Orbigny, 1846; Mactra guadelupensis Récluz, 1852; Mulinia branneri Dall, 1901; Mulinia portoricensis Shuttleworth, 1856

= Mulinia cleryana =

Mulinia cleryana Temporal range: Miocene–recent

Species of bivalve

Mulinia cleryana is a species of marine bivalve in the family Mactridae. This species occurs in the Caribbean Sea and the western Atlantic Ocean as far south as Brazil. It can grow to 40 mm (1.6 in).

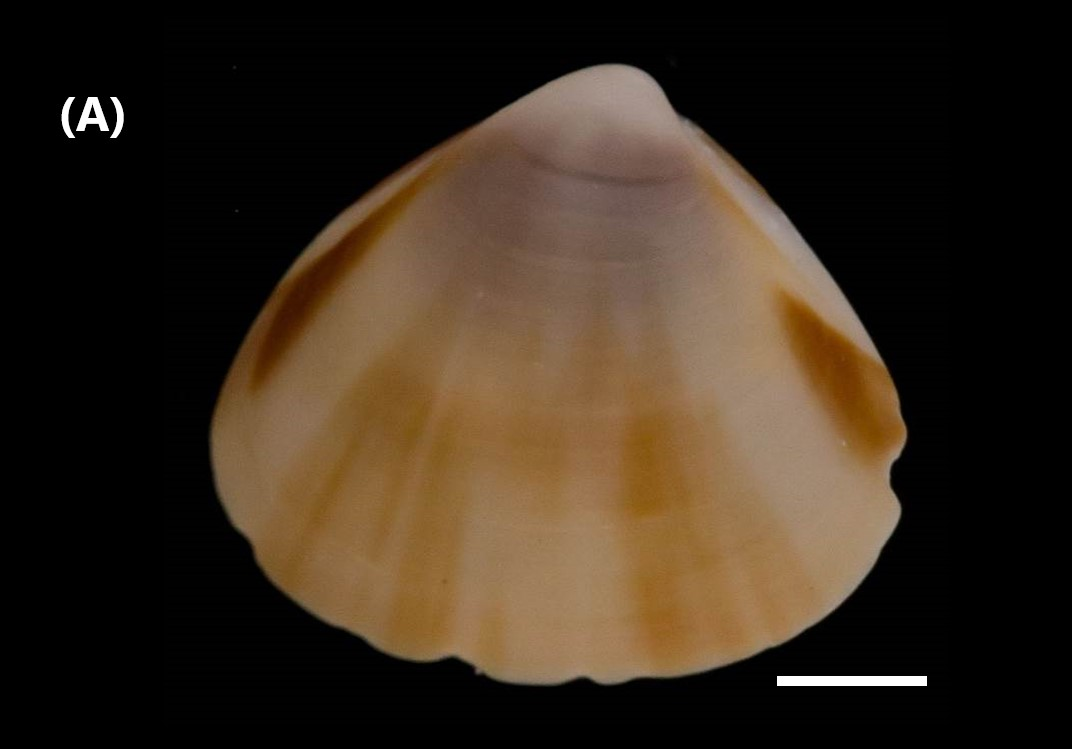
A shell from northeast Brazil. Scale bar = 0.5 mm.
