= UK Archaeological Sciences Conference =

The United Kingdom Archaeological Sciences Conference is a biennial conference established in 1987 at the University of Glasgow.

From 1987 to 1999 the conference proceedings were published. Major topics discussed at the conference include stable isotope analysis, proteomics, ancient genetics and material analysis. The 2017 conference at UCL was attended by 190 delegates from 20 countries.

== Conference locations ==
Year	Location
1987	Glasgow
1989	Bradford
1991	York
1993	Bournemouth
1995	Liverpool
1997	Durham
1999	Bristol
2001	Newcastle
2003	Oxford
2005	Bradford
2009	Nottingham
2011	Reading
2013	Cardiff
2015	Durham
2017	UCL
2019	Manchester
2022	Aberdeen
2024	York
2026	Bristol
