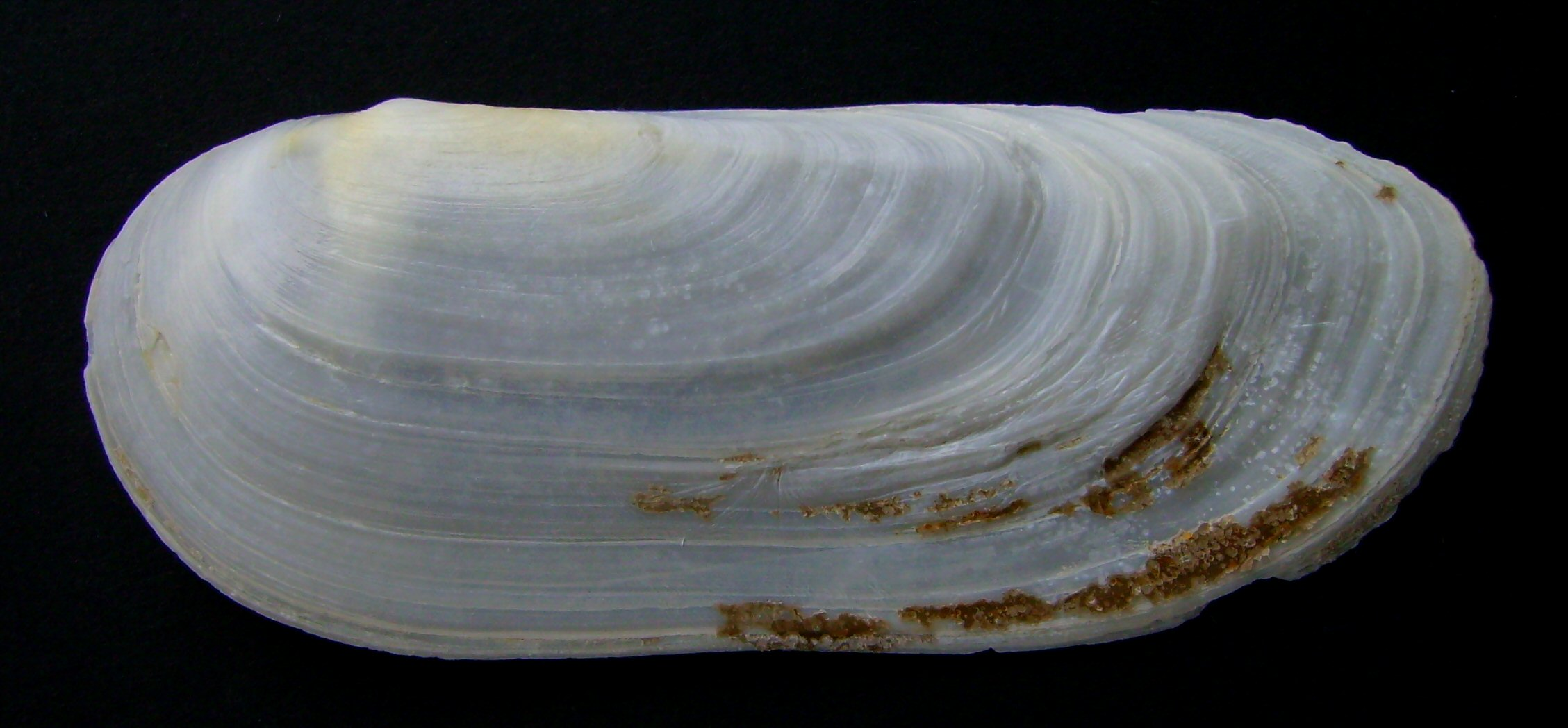

Scientific classification
- Kingdom: Animalia
- Phylum: Mollusca
- Class: Bivalvia
- Order: Venerida
- Superfamily: Mactroidea
- Family: Mactridae
- Genus: Zenatia
- Species: Z. acinaces

Binomial name
- Zenatia acinaces (Quoy and Gaimard, 1835)

Synonyms
- Lutraria acinaces Quoy and Gaimard, 1835; Zenatia zelandica Gray, 1853; Lutraria deshayesi Reeve, 1854

= Zenatia acinaces =

Zenatia acinaces Temporal range: Lower Pliocene to Present

Species of bivalve

Zenatia acinaces is a species of moderately large marine bivalve mollusc in the family Mactridae.

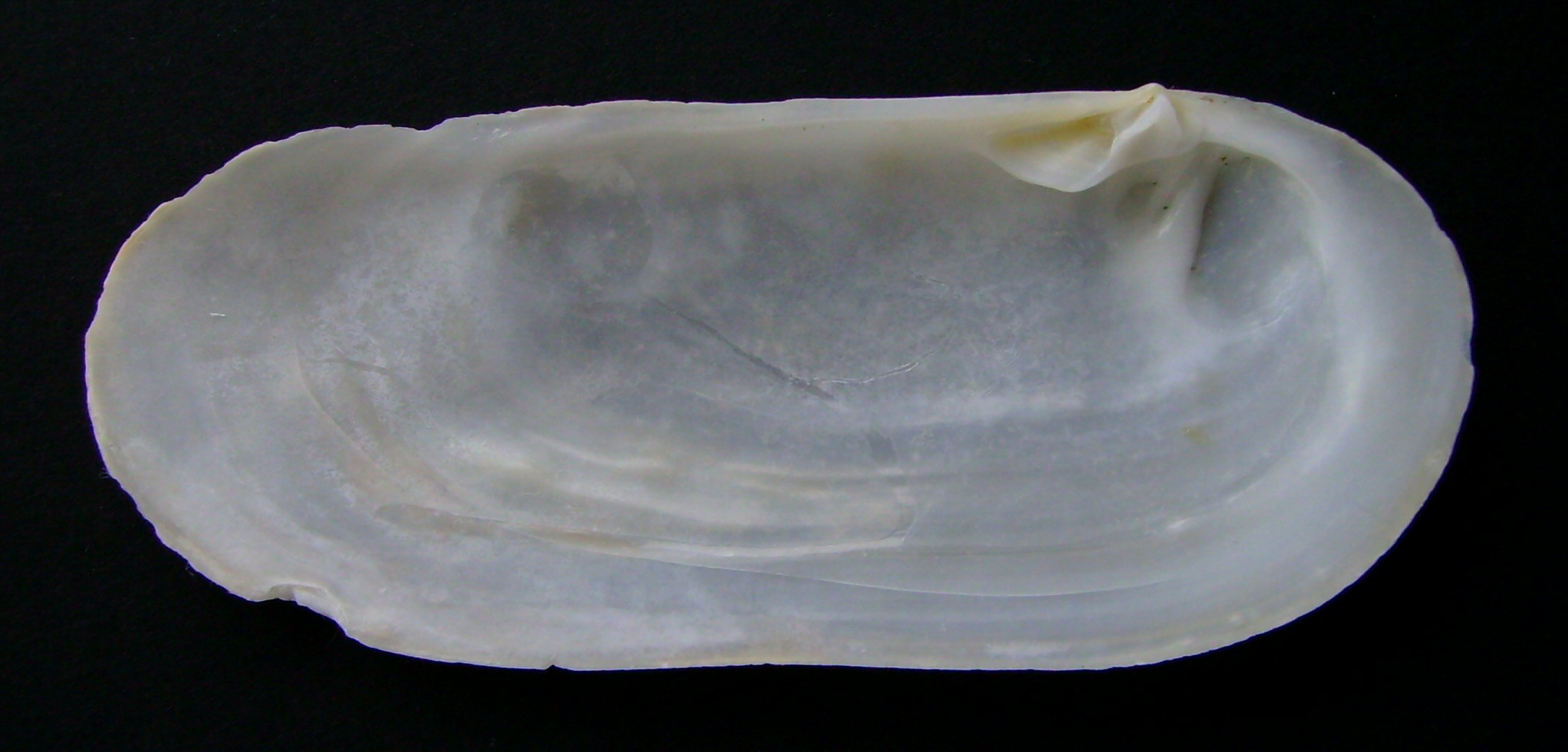
Inside view of Zenatia acinaces
