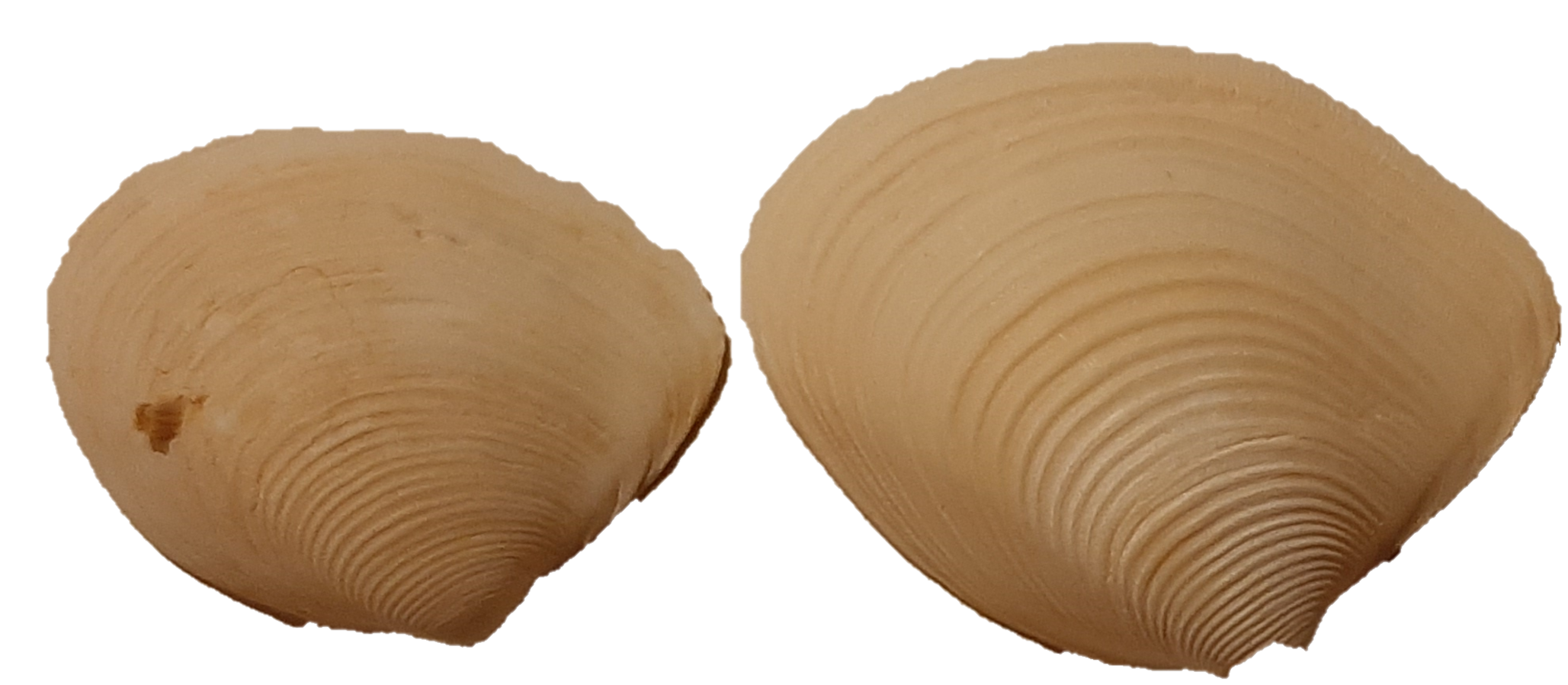
- Anatina anatina

Scientific classification
- Domain: Eukaryota
- Kingdom: Animalia
- Phylum: Mollusca
- Class: Bivalvia
- Order: Venerida
- Superfamily: Mactroidea
- Family: Mactridae
- Genus: Anatina; Schumacher, 1817

Species
- See text

= Anatina =

Genus of bivalves

Anatina is a genus of saltwater clams, marine bivalve molluscs in the family Mactridae.

== Species ==
Species within the genus Anatina include:

- Anatina anatina (Spengler, 1802)
- Anatina cyprina (W. Wood, 1828)
- Anatina inconstans (Cosel, 1995)
- Anatina vitrea (Spengler, 1802)
