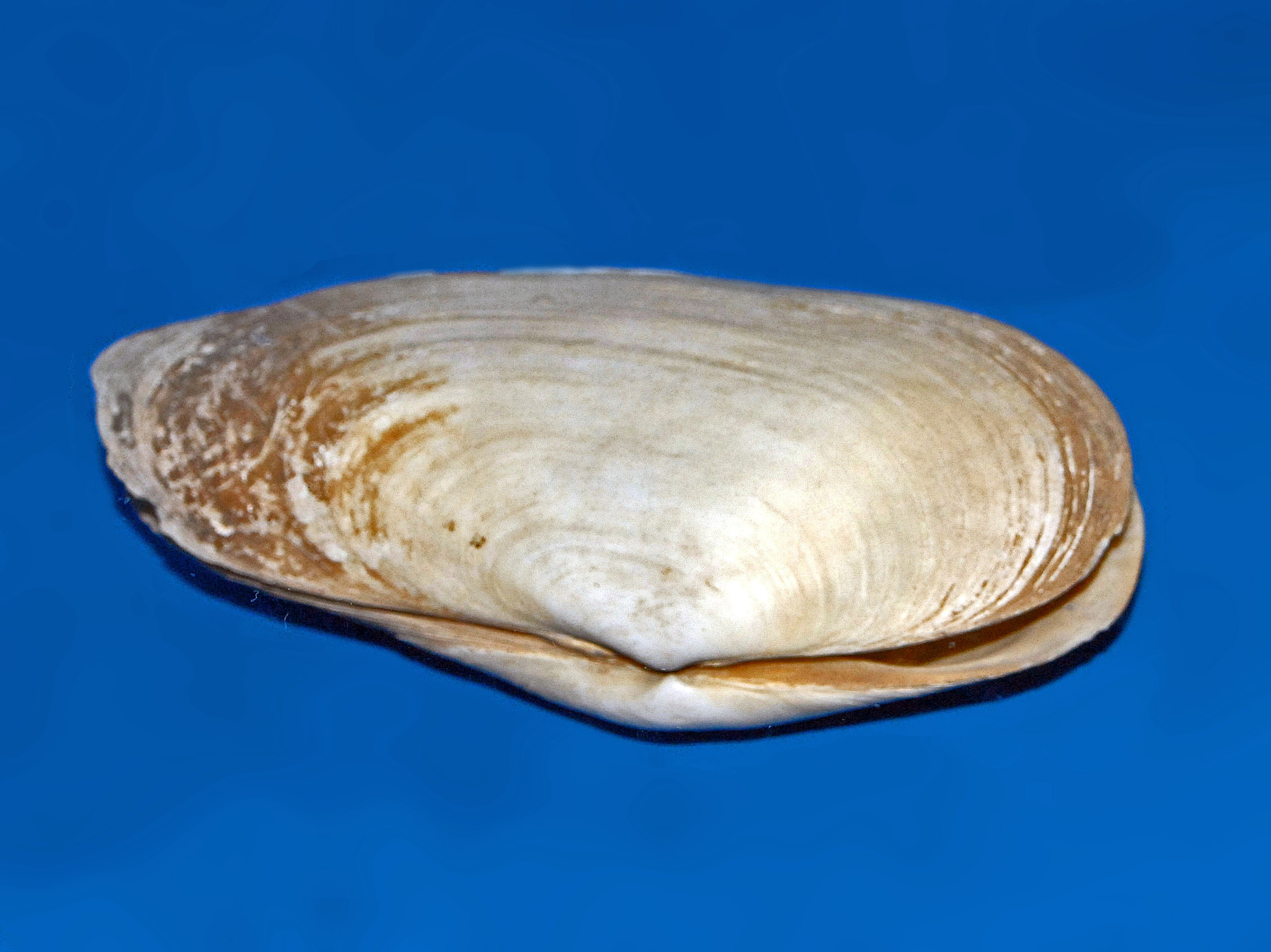
- Shell of Lutraria oblonga from Sicily at the Museo Civico di Storia Naturale di Milano

Scientific classification
- Kingdom: Animalia
- Phylum: Mollusca
- Class: Bivalvia
- Order: Venerida
- Family: Mactridae
- Genus: Lutraria
- Species: L. oblonga

Binomial name
- Lutraria oblonga (Gmelin, 1791)

Synonyms
- Lutraria magna (da Costa, 1778); Lutraria solenoides Lamarck, 1801; Mactra hians Pulteney, 1799; Mya oblonga Gmelin, 1791

= Lutraria oblonga =

Species of bivalve

Lutraria oblonga, common name the oblong otter shell, is a species of large saltwater clam, a marine bivalve mollusc in the family Mactridae.

== Description ==
Lutraria oblonga has a shell that can grow to a length of 11–15 cm.

Right and left valve of the same specimen:

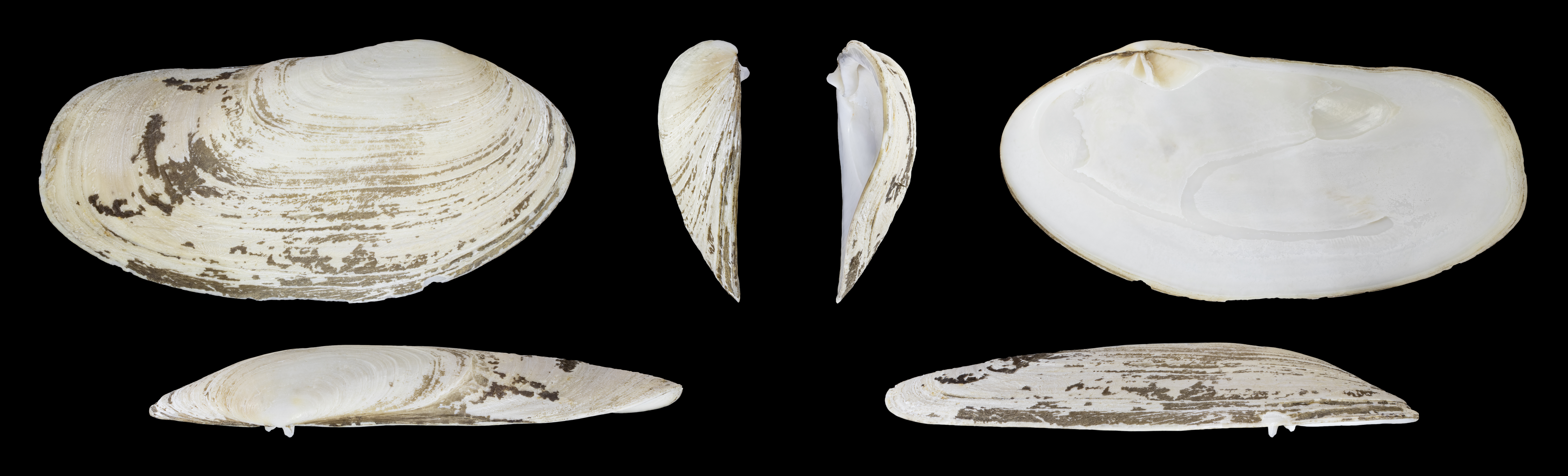
Right valve

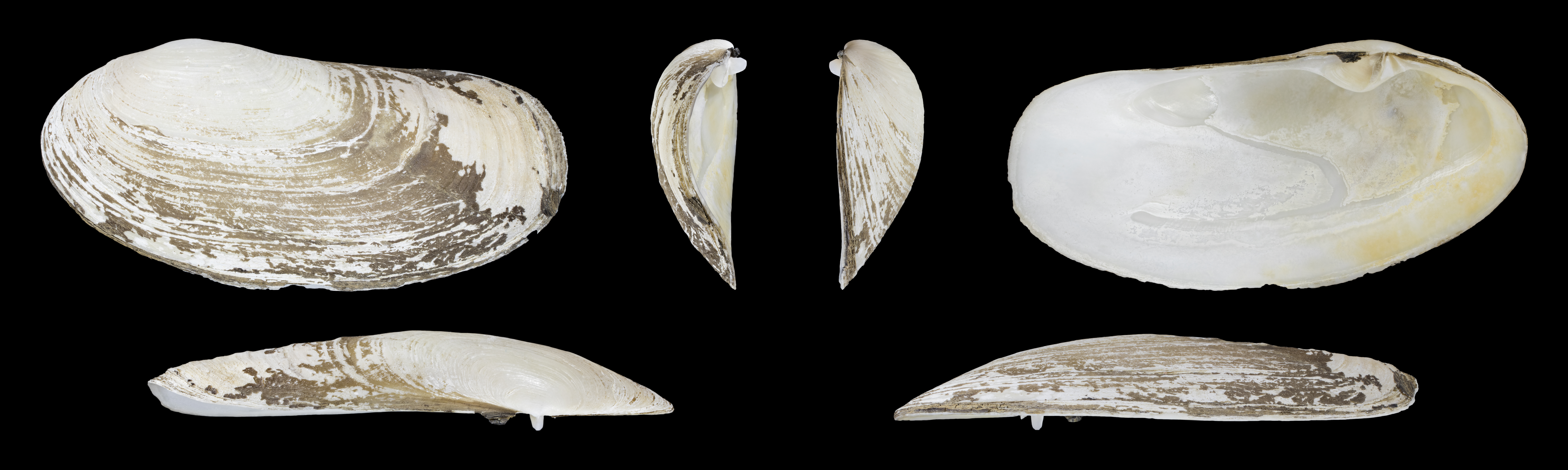
Left valve

== Distribution ==
L. oblonga is present in the North African coast of the Mediterranean Sea, in the Red Sea and in the eastern coast of Africa.
