= Rangia =

Rangia may refer to

- Rangia or Rangiya, a city in Assam
- Rangia (bivalve), a genus of bivalve molluscs
