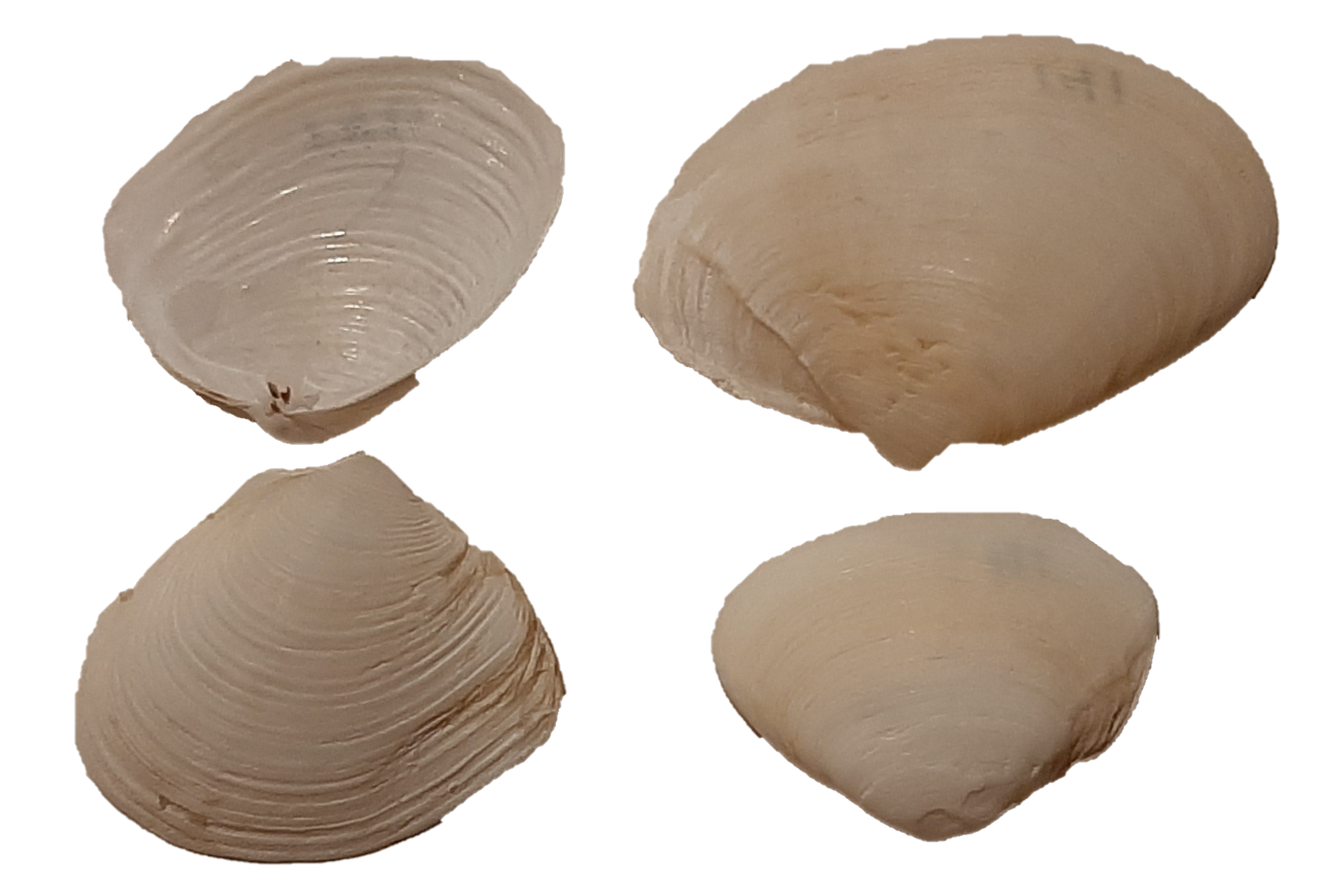

Scientific classification
- Domain: Eukaryota
- Kingdom: Animalia
- Phylum: Mollusca
- Class: Bivalvia
- Order: Venerida
- Family: Mactridae
- Genus: Anatina
- Species: A. anatina

Binomial name
- Anatina anatina (Spengler, 1802)

Synonyms
- Anatina lineata (Say, 1822)

= Anatina anatina =

Species of bivalve

Anatina anatina, commonly called smooth duckclam, is a species of bivalves in the family Anatinellidae which is found in America.
