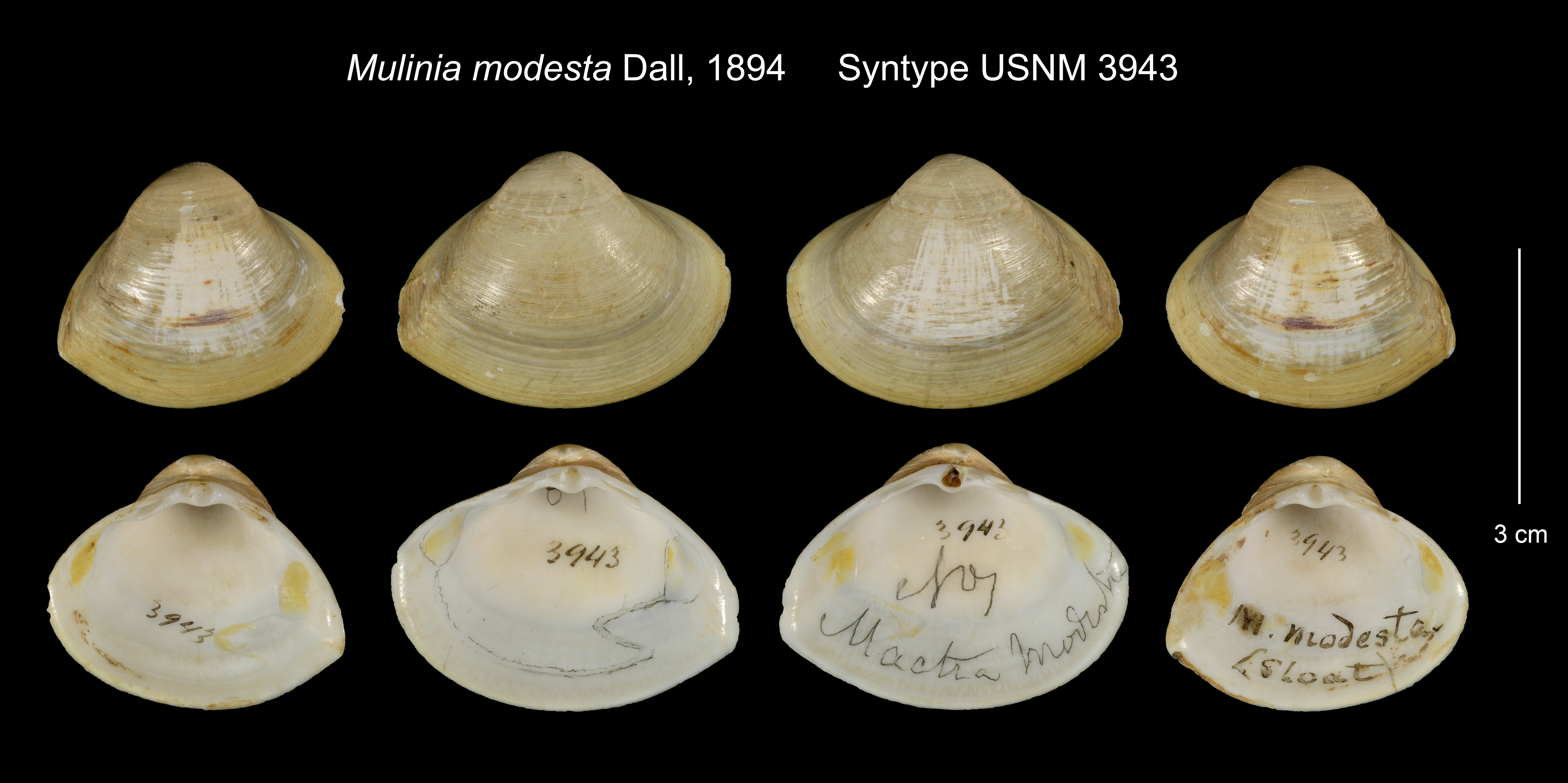
- Dry shells

Scientific classification
- Kingdom: Animalia
- Phylum: Mollusca
- Class: Bivalvia
- Order: Venerida
- Family: Mactridae
- Genus: Mulinia
- Species: M. modesta

Binomial name
- Mulinia modesta (Carpenter, 1864)

Synonyms
- Mactra modesta Carpenter, 1864; Mulinia coloradoensis Dall, 1894; Mactra coloradoensis Dall, 1894; Mulinia coloradoensis var. acuta Dall, 1894; Mulinia coloradoensis subsp. acuta (Dall, 1894)

= Mulinia modesta =

Species of bivalve

Mulinia modesta is a species of clam belonging to the family Mactridae.

== Description ==
The longitude of a medium sized specimen is 49 mm, the altitude 36.5 mm and the diameter 82 mm.

The shell is solid, rude and equilateral. It resembles Mulinia modesta, but is larger and has the posterior dorsal margin more arched. The base behind the posterior dorsal angle is somewhat concavely flexuous, and the surface anteriorly and on the dorsal area is marked with obsolete, little elevated radii.

== Distribution ==
It is endemic to the northern and central Gulf of California. The clam is known to live in both brackish and fully marine habitats. It is a shallow-water filter feeder that prefers mud-sand bottoms.

== Conservation history ==
Prior to the diversion of water upstream in the Colorado River, this species might have been the most common mollusc in the Colorado River Delta, in the extreme northwestern region of the northern Gulf of California. It has been estimated to have constituted 80-90% of the clams throughout the delta and was so abundant that heaps of the shells formed ridges that stretched for miles. The density of Mulinia modesta has estimated to have been reduced from 25 to 50 per m^{2} to three per m^{2}.

It has been hypothesized that the increase in salinity of the water and decrease of nutrient input from the river as a result of diversion and use of water led to the decline of the clam in the extreme northeastern region of the upper Gulf of California. The clams are not harvested and are not affected by pressure from fishing.

Studies of the clam have been used to infer the original extent the estuary in the absence of earlier survey data. Shells of the clam became sharply less prevalent about 65 km (40 mi) south of the river's mouth, constituting only 25% of shells in this area, and becoming rare to absent at a distance of 80 km (50 mi). These observations have been used to infer that the mixing zone of river and sea water probably extended as far as 65 km (40 mi) south of the river's mouth. Isotope analysis of oxygen in the shells of the clam have also been used to independently estimate rates of salinity, and the results from this approach were found to correspond with observations of the prevalence of the clam shells, and also to agree with numerical models proposed in the past.

== Ecology ==
Damage to shells was used to assess the trophic importance of this species, and it was found to be a major source of food for crabs and predatory gastropods. On the basis of these studies, it was predicted that restoration of water flow in the Colorado River would result in an increase in this species, which would result in an increase of species that depend on it for food, including commercially valuable crabs.
