= Crassula (disambiguation) =

Crassula may refer to:

- Crassula, a succulent plants genus in the family Crassulaceae
- Crassula (bivalve), a bivalve genus in the family Mactridae
