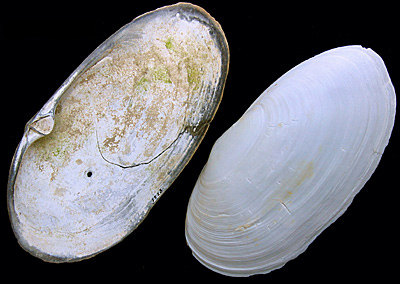
- Lutraria lutraria

Scientific classification
- Kingdom: Animalia
- Phylum: Mollusca
- Class: Bivalvia
- Order: Venerida
- Superfamily: Mactroidea
- Family: Mactridae
- Genus: Lutraria; Lamarck, 1799

Species
- See text.

= Lutraria =

Lutraria Temporal range: Eocene – Present

Genus of bivalves

Lutraria is a genus of medium-sized marine bivalve mollusks or clams, commonly known as otter shells.

== Characteristics ==
Members of this genus have large, elongated oval shells with two equal sized valves. The anterior end is somewhat sharply curved but the posterior end is more rounded. The valves gape slightly at both ends, more so at the posterior end. The shell is fairly thick and is sculptured with fine concentric lines corresponding to periods of growth. The basic colour is white and the periostracum is brown, but the latter is usually abraded. The interior surface of the valves is glossy white. The beaks are blunt and situated slightly closer to the anterior end. The ligament is small and largely internal. The foot is small and the siphons are long and are housed in a common horny sheath for most of their length.

== Biology ==
These mollusks live buried in sand to a depth of about 30 cm (12 in), usually below low water mark, with their siphons extended to the sea bed. As they grow they burrow deeper but are otherwise relatively sedentary.

== Fossil record ==
Fossils of Lutraria are found in marine strata from the Eocene to the Quaternary (age range: from 33.9 to 0.0 million years ago.). Fossils are known from Europe, South Africa, Japan, New Zealand, Pakistan, Australia, India and Argentina.

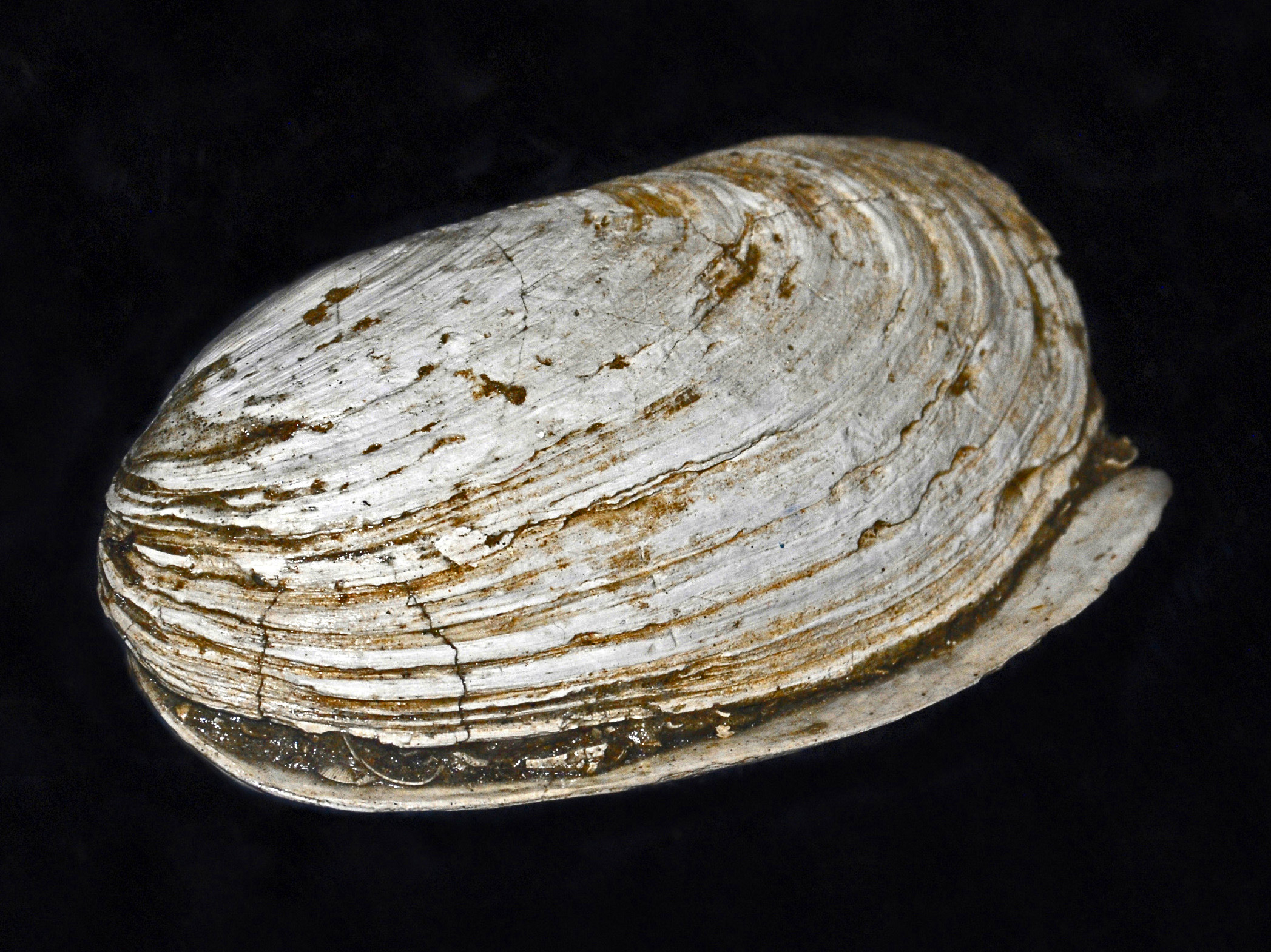
Fossil shell of Lutraria oblonga

== Species ==
- Lutraria angustior Philippi, 1844
- Lutraria budkeri Nicklès, 1955
- Lutraria capensis Reeve, 1854
- Lutraria complanata (Gmelin, 1791)
- Lutraria curta Reeve, 1854
- Lutraria impar Reeve, 1854
- Lutraria inhacaensis Boshoff, 1965
- Lutraria lutraria (Linnaeus, 1758)
- Lutraria maxima Jonas, 1844
- Lutraria oblonga (Gmelin, 1791)
- Lutraria rhynchaena Jonas, 1844
- Lutraria senegalensis Gray, 1837
- Lutraria sieboldii Reeve, 1854
- Lutraria steynlussii Huber, 2010
- Lutraria turneri Jousseaume, 1891
