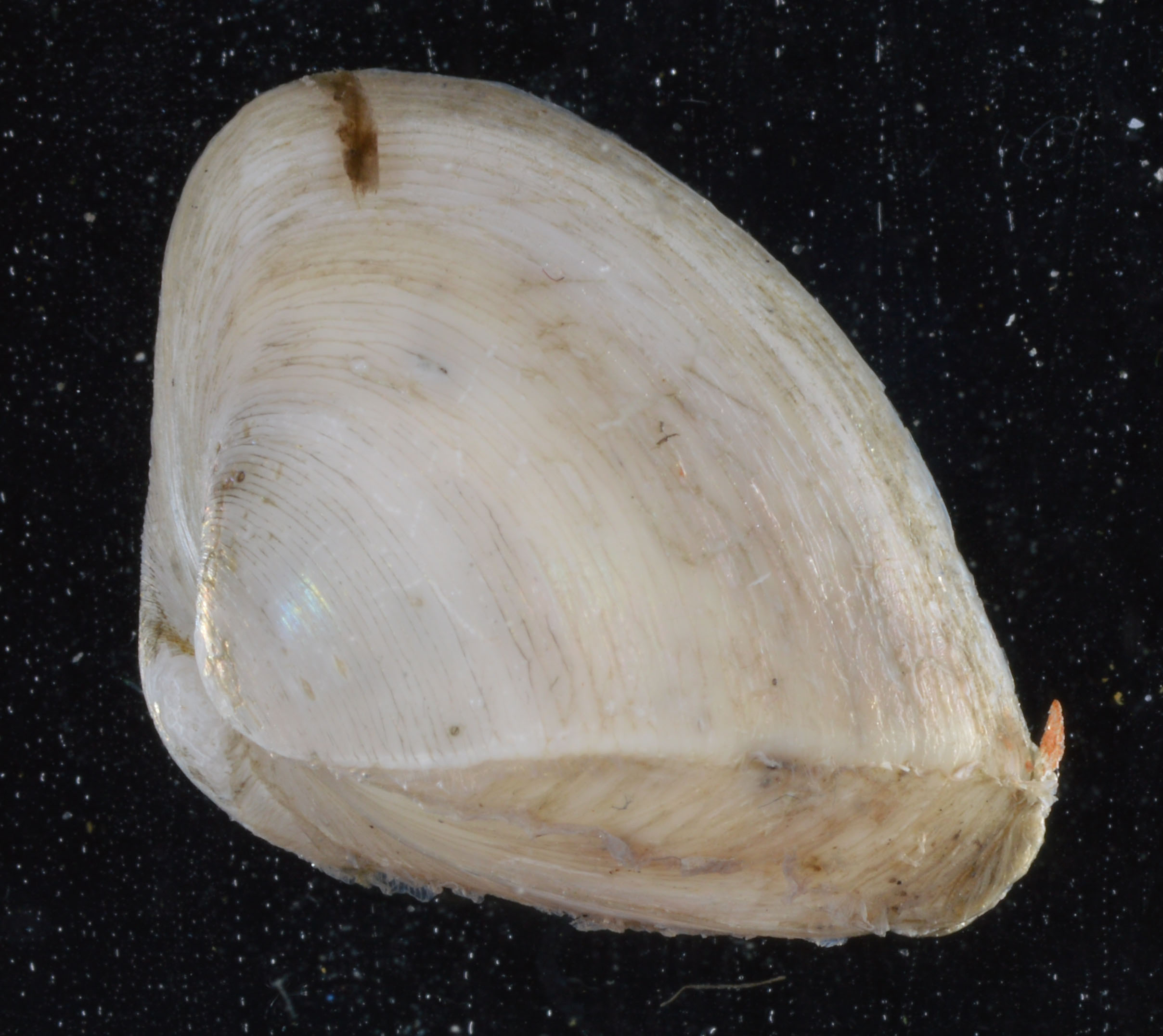
- Mulinia lateralis

Scientific classification
- Domain: Eukaryota
- Kingdom: Animalia
- Phylum: Mollusca
- Class: Bivalvia
- Order: Venerida
- Superfamily: Mactroidea
- Family: Mactridae
- Subfamily: Mactrinae
- Genus: Mulinia; Gray, 1837

Species
- See text.

= Mulinia =

Genus of bivalves

Mulinia is a genus of small to medium-sized saltwater and estuarine clams, marine bivalve mollusks in the family Mactridae.

== Species ==
Species within the genus Mulinia include:

- Mulinia cleryana
- Mulinia coloradoensis – the Colorado Delta clam
- Mulinia edulis
- Mulinia lateralis
- Mulinia pallida
