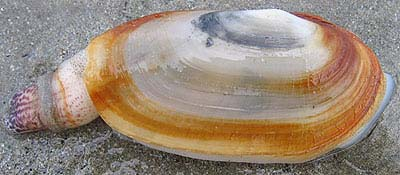
- Otter shell with unextended siphons

Scientific classification
- Kingdom: Animalia
- Phylum: Mollusca
- Class: Bivalvia
- Order: Venerida
- Superfamily: Mactroidea
- Family: Mactridae
- Genus: Lutraria
- Species: L. lutraria

Binomial name
- Lutraria lutraria (Linnaeus, 1758)

Synonyms
- Chama magna da Costa, 1778; Lutraria elliptica Lamarck, 1801; Lutraria elliptica var. latior Philippi, 1844; Lutraria lutraria var. panormensis Gregorio, 1885; Lutraria solida Philippi, 1851; Lutraria vulgaris Fleming, 1828; Mya lutraria Linnaeus, 1758 (basionym)

= Lutraria lutraria =

Species of bivalve

Lutraria lutraria is a species of large marine bivalve mollusc in the family Mactridae. Its common names include the otter shell and the common otter shell. It occurs in coastal regions of the north east Atlantic Ocean where it lives buried in the sand.

== Taxonomy ==
Lutraria lutraria is the type species of the genus Lutraria, the name Mya lutraria being the basionym used by Carl Linnaeus when he described the species in 1758. It was later determined that there were sufficient differences between it and other Mya species for the otter shell to be placed in its own genus. The similarity between Mya and Lutraria is due to convergence due to exploitation of the same habitat rather than a close phylogenetic relationship.

== Description ==
L. lutraria has a pair of large, elongated oval valves up to 15 cm (6 in) long. They are smooth, glossy and fairly thin. They are a creamy colour and the periostracum is olive brown. This layer gets worn away over time and is often completely missing in shells found on the beach. There are concentric sculptured lines showing periods of growth and a few faint radial lines near the hinge. The left valve has two cardinal teeth with a third small one behind. The right valve has two small cardinal teeth and a small lateral one.

The flesh of the animal is white. The foot is thick and protrudes through the pedal gape at the posterior end. The mantle edges are fringed with white and are fused together. The massive siphons can be extended to two or three times the length of the shell and are joined together for their entire length. They are streaked with brown and purple and are housed in a transparent, gelatinous sheath composed of protein and chitin. The siphons are outgrowths of the mantle while the sheath is a continuation of the periostracum. There are two rings of tiny tentacles round the orifice of the inhalant siphon and a single ring and a membrane round the exhalant one. The mantle has a fourth pallial opening near the base of the siphon.

Right and left valve of the same specimen:

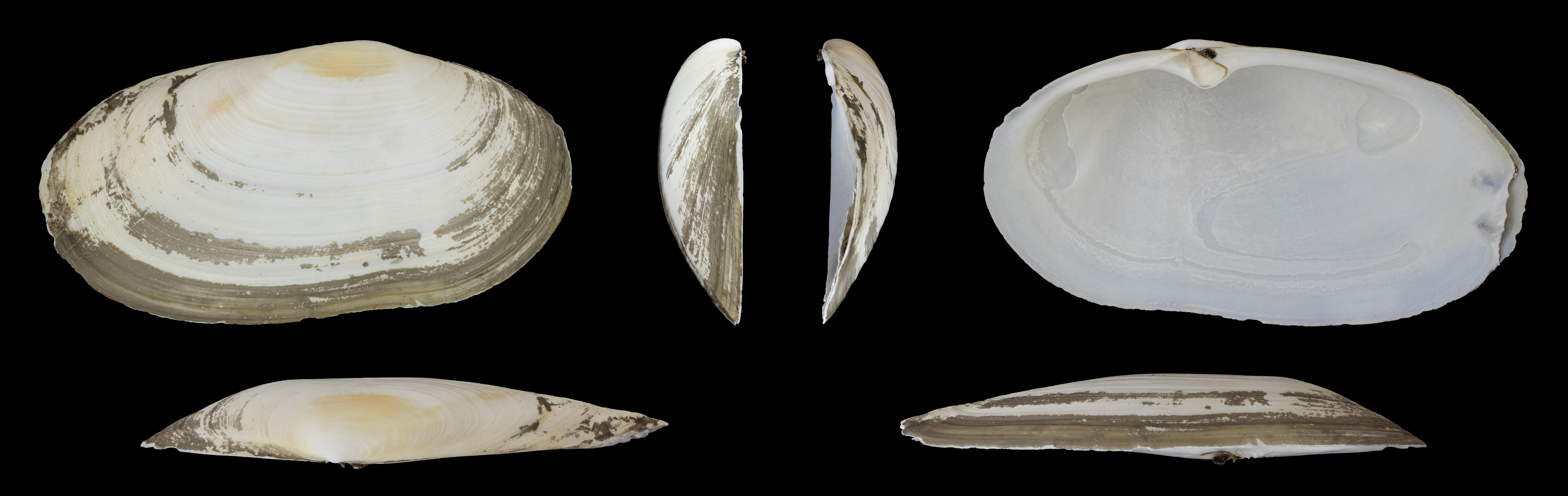
Right valve

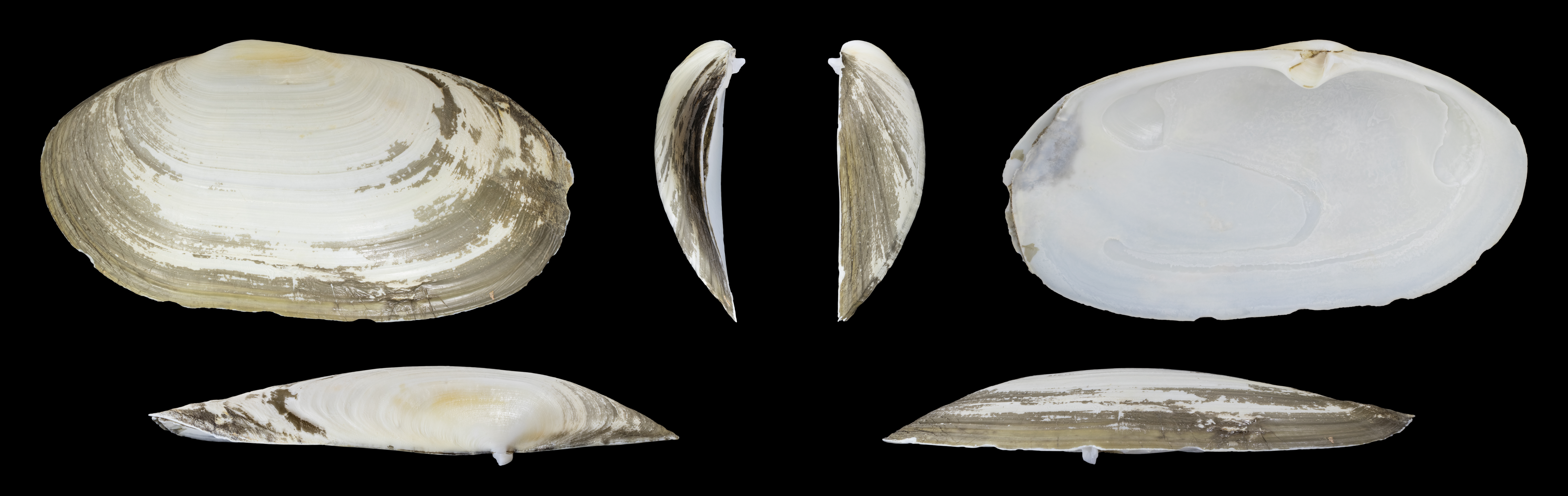
Left valve

== Distribution ==
L. lutraria is found off the coasts of north west Europe from Norway south to the Mediterranean Sea and also in West Africa. It is found in soft substrates from the low tide mark down to about one hundred metres. The largest individuals with the longest siphons bury themselves at the greatest depths.

== Biology ==
L. lutraria is a filter feeder. It draws in water through one siphon and expels it through the other. Respiration takes place as the water current passes over the gills. Waste is periodically expelled through the fourth pallial opening which can also be used for expulsion of water from the mantle cavity.

Trawling may damage or remove the tips of the siphons and bottom feeding fish may nip them off but the animal can regenerate the inner layers over the course of a few days.

Hydraulic blade dredge fishing takes place for razor clams, Ensis spp., in Scotland and the process was studied to examine its impact. Bottom trawling of the seabed is often preceded by a sand fluidation process designed to loosen the sediment. Dredging damages a considerable portion of the benthic megafauna including L. lutraria, however this species tends to live at greater depths than is reached by the process. Nevertheless, between 20% and 100% are damaged in a single dredge haul. Some individuals are undamaged but left lying on the surface and it has been found that their ability to rebury themselves is limited. Unlike razor clams, they normally spend their lives in one spot and the foot is relatively small and mainly used for anchorage rather than digging. Any animal unable to rebury itself rapidly is likely to fall prey to the scavengers that move in after a trawl has passed. Such studies are of importance in assessing the ecological consequence and sustainability of fisheries.
