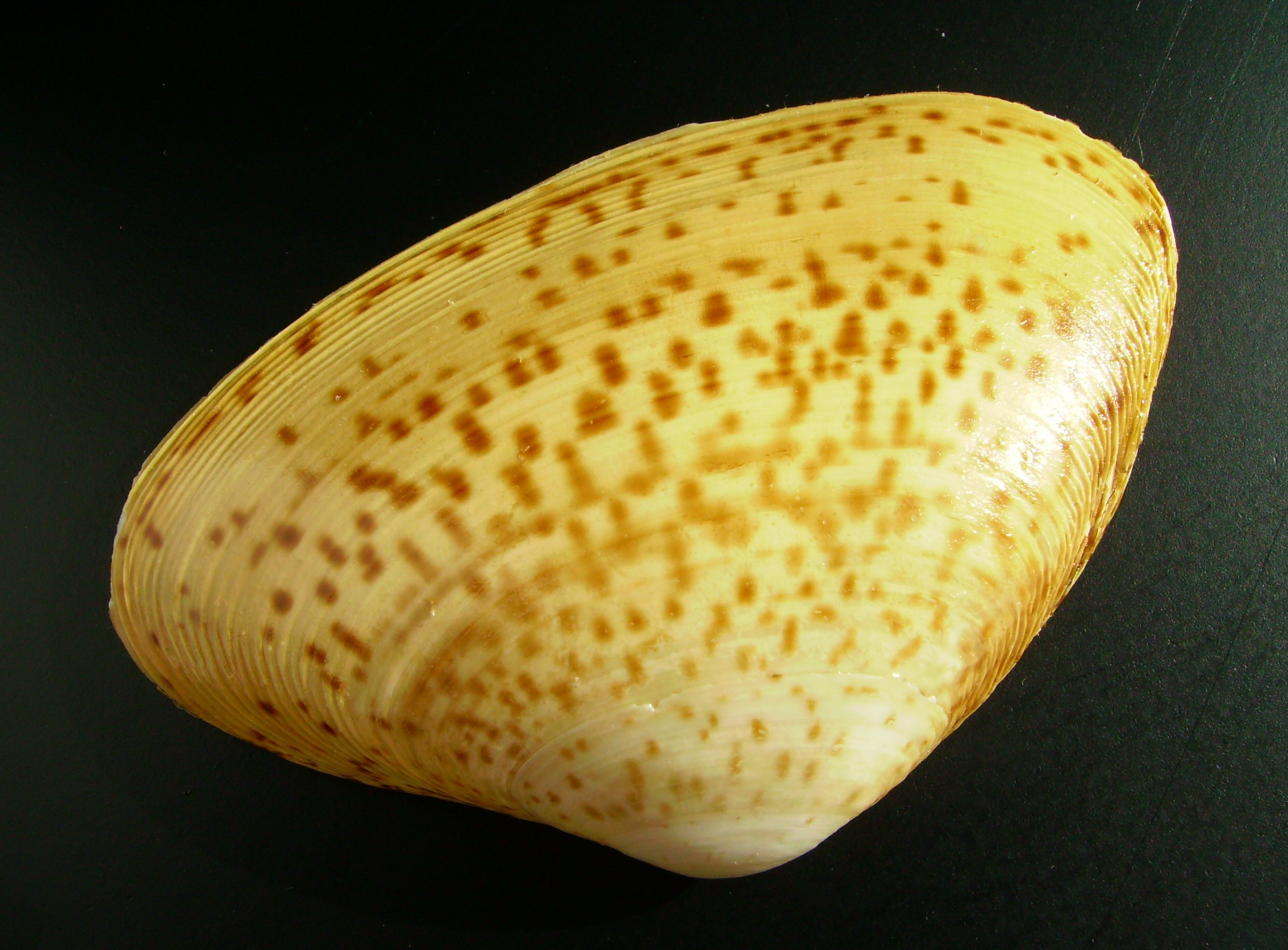
- Oxyperas elongatum

Scientific classification
- Kingdom: Animalia
- Phylum: Mollusca
- Class: Bivalvia
- Order: Venerida
- Family: Mactridae
- Subfamily: Mactrinae
- Genus: Oxyperas; Mörch, 1853

Type species
- Oxyperas lentiginosum (A. Gould, 1852)

Species
- †Oxyperas asperaeformis (Nomura & Zinbo, 1934); Oxyperas aspersum (G. B. Sowerby I, 1825); Oxyperas bellianum (W. R. B. Oliver, 1915); Oxyperas bernardi (Pilsbry, 1904); Oxyperas coppingeri (E. A. Smith, 1884); Oxyperas egenum (Reeve, 1854); Oxyperas elongatum (Quoy & Gaimard, 1835); †Oxyperas exense P. A. Maxwell, 1978; †Oxyperas flemingi (Marwick, 1960); †Oxyperas leda (H. J. Finlay, 1924); Oxyperas lentiginosum (A. Gould, 1852); †Oxyperas ortmanni Zinsmeister, 1984; Oxyperas proaspersum (Sacco, 1901); Oxyperas transversum (Reeve, 1854)

Synonyms
- Longimactra H. J. Finlay, 1928; Mactra (Oxyperas) Mörch, 1853; Mactra (Pseudoxyperas) Sacco, 1901 superseded combination; Oxyperas (Pseudoxyperas) Sacco, 1901; Pseudoxyperas Sacco, 1901; Spisula (Oxyperas) Mörch, 1853 superseded rank; Spisula (Pseudoxyperas) Sacco, 1901

= Oxyperas =

Genus of bivalves

Oxyperas is a genus of large marine bivalve molluscs or clams, in the family Mactridae.
