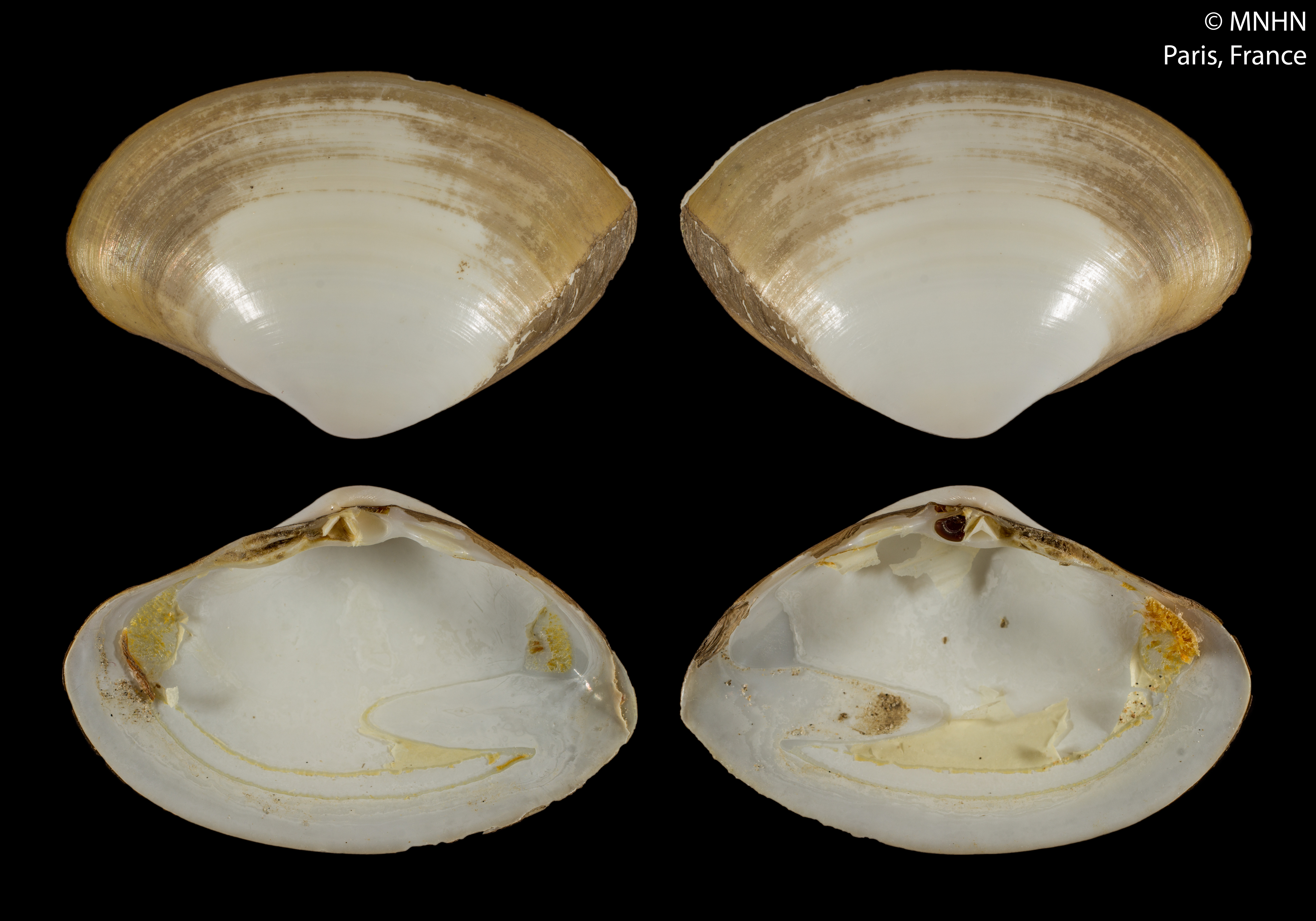
- Scissodesma angolensis

Scientific classification
- Domain: Eukaryota
- Kingdom: Animalia
- Phylum: Mollusca
- Class: Bivalvia
- Order: Venerida
- Superfamily: Mactroidea
- Family: Mactridae
- Subfamily: Mactrinae
- Genus: Scissodesma; Gray, 1837

Type species
- Mactra spengleri Linnaeus, 1767

Synonyms
- Schizodesma of Gray, 1838 · unaccep (incorrect subsequent spelling); Scissodesma (Crepispisula) Eames, 1957 · alternate representation; Scissodesma (Scissodesma) Gray, 1837 · alternate representation; † Spisula (Crepispisula) Eames, 1957

= Scissodesma =

Genus of bivalves

Scissodesma is a genus of bivalves belonging to the subfamily Mactrinae of the family Mactridae.

The species of this genus are found in Africa.

Species:

- Scissodesma acutissima (Cosel, 1995)
- Scissodesma (Crepispisula) amekiensis (Eames, 1957)
- Scissodesma angolensis (Cosel, 1995)
- Scissodesma micronitida (Cosel, 1995)
- Scissodesma nitida (Gmelin, 1791)
- Scissodesma spengleri (Linnaeus, 1767)
