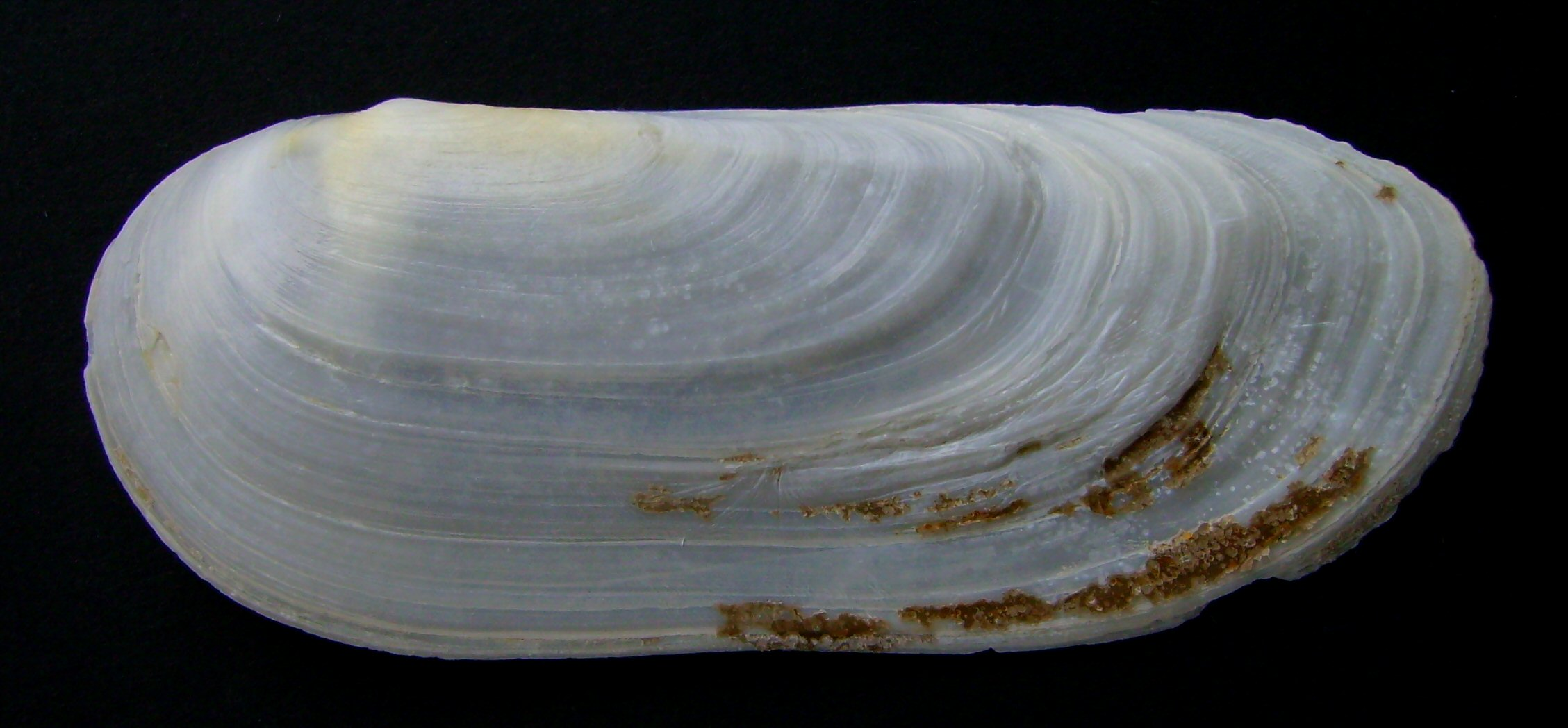
- One valve of a shell of Zenatia acinaces

Scientific classification
- Kingdom: Animalia
- Phylum: Mollusca
- Class: Bivalvia
- Order: Venerida
- Superfamily: Mactroidea
- Family: Mactridae
- Genus: Zenatia; Gray, 1853

Species
- See text.

= Zenatia =

Genus of bivalves

Zenatia is a genus of medium-sized clams, marine bivalve molluscs in the family Mactridae.

== Distribution ==
This genus is endemic to New Zealand.

== Species ==
Species in the genus Zenatia include:

- Zenatia acinaces (Quoy and Gaimard)
- Zenatia zelandica Gray
