= Isotope analysis =

Analytical technique based on isotopic abundance

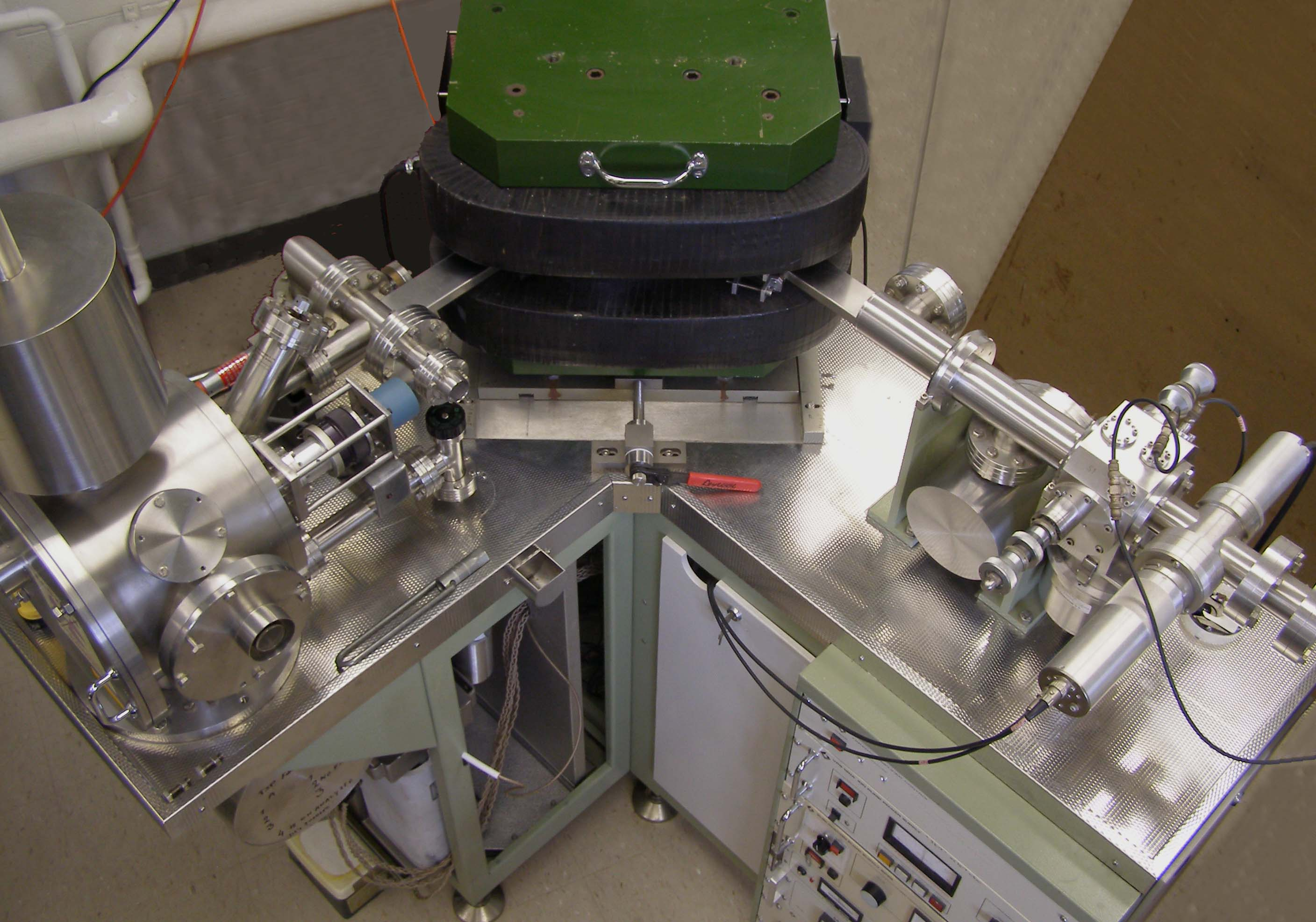
Magnetic sector mass spectrometer used in isotope ratio analysis, through thermal ionization

Isotope analysis (or bulk stable isotope analysis) is the identification of isotopic signature, abundance of certain stable isotopes of chemical elements within organic and inorganic compounds. Isotopic analysis can be used to understand the flow of energy through a food web, to reconstruct past environmental and climatic conditions, to investigate human and animal diets, for food authentication, and a variety of other physical, geological, paleontological and chemical processes. Stable isotope ratios are measured using mass spectrometry, which separates the different isotopes of an element on the basis of their mass-to-charge ratio. Isotope analysis has widespread applicability in the natural sciences. These include numerous applications in the biological, earth and environmental sciences.

== Biology ==
Biologists use a wide variety of tissue types for stable isotope analysis depending on their specific research question. The isotopic profile of any given tissue is a product of both environmental factors (diet, geographic baseline) and metabolism/physiological processes (tissue turnover time, diet-tissue discrimination factors, isotopic routing, fractionization, etc.) with the later explaining the differing isotopic compositions of tissues from the same organism (and thus a tissue's relevancy for any specific research question).

=== Time scale ===
Tissue with long turnover times are not replenished rapidly in the body and thus their isotopic analysis can provide insight into an organism's environment over a longer timeframe. Common tissues for long-term isotopic assessments include bone marrow, collagen, and dentine (teeth). Rapid turnover tissues are being constantly replaced within an organism and thus reflect a much more short-term window into an animals isotopic composition, making them ideal for research interested in seasonal, ontogenetic, or disturbance-based shifts in organism's diet, movement, or food web structure. Common short term tissues include plasma and liver tissue.

Tissues of animals that grow by accretion like hair, fish otoliths and scales, tree or coral growth rings are of unique interest to stable isotope ecologists as they grow in concentric rings throughout an organism's life with each ring growing atop previous rings without effecting their chemical makeup. By examining the chemical composition of each ring, researchers can understand an organism's isotopic profile across its lifespan or, in long-lived species, ask important questions about ancient ecosystems or climates.

== Archaeology ==
=== Reconstructing ancient diets ===
Archaeological materials, such as bone, organic residues, hair, or sea shells, can serve as substrates for isotopic analysis. Carbon, nitrogen and zinc isotope ratios are used to investigate the diets of past people; these isotopic systems can be used with others, such as strontium or oxygen, to answer questions about population movements and cultural interactions, such as trade.

Carbon isotopes are analysed in archaeology to determine the source of carbon at the base of the foodchain. Examining the ^{12}C/^{13}C isotope ratio, it is possible to determine whether animals and humans ate predominantly C3 or C4 plants. Potential C3 food sources include wheat, rice, tubers, fruits, nuts and many vegetables, while C4 food sources include millet and sugar cane. Carbon isotope ratios can also be used to distinguish between marine, freshwater, and terrestrial food sources.

Carbon isotope ratios can be measured in bone collagen or bone mineral (hydroxylapatite), and each of these fractions of bone can be analysed to shed light on different components of diet. The carbon in bone collagen is predominantly sourced from dietary protein, while the carbon found in bone mineral is sourced from all consumed dietary carbon, included carbohydrates, lipids, and protein.

Nitrogen isotopes can be used to infer soil conditions, with enriched δ15N used to infer the addition of manure. A complication is that enrichment also occurs as a result of environmental factors, such as wetland denitrification, salinity, aridity, microbes, and clearance. δ13C and δ15N measurements on medieval manor soils has shown that stable isotopes can differentiate between crop cultivation and grazing activities, revealing land use types such as cereal production and the presence of fertilization practices at historical sites.

To obtain an accurate picture of palaeodiets, it is important to understand processes of diagenesis that may affect the original isotopic signal. It is also important for the researcher to know the variations of isotopes within individuals, between individuals, and over time.

=== Sourcing archaeological materials ===
Isotope analysis has been particularly useful in archaeology as a means of characterization. Characterization of artifacts involves determining the isotopic composition of possible source materials such as metal ore bodies and comparing these data to the isotopic composition of analyzed artifacts. A wide range of archaeological materials such as metals, glass and lead-based pigments have been sourced using isotopic characterization. Particularly in the Bronze Age Mediterranean, lead isotope analysis has been a useful tool for determining the sources of metals and an important indicator of trade patterns. Interpretation of lead isotope data is, however, often contentious and faces numerous instrumental and methodological challenges. Problems such as the mixing and re-using of metals from different sources, limited reliable data and contamination of samples can be difficult problems in interpretation.

== Ecology ==
All biologically active elements exist in a number of different isotopic forms, of which two or more are stable. For example, most carbon is present as ^{12}C, with approximately 1% being ^{13}C. The ratio of the two isotopes may be altered by biological and geophysical processes, and these differences can be utilized in a number of ways by ecologists. The main elements used in isotope ecology are carbon, nitrogen, oxygen, hydrogen and sulfur, but also include silicon, iron, and strontium.

=== Stable isotope analysis in aquatic ecosystems ===
Stable isotopes have become a popular method for understanding aquatic ecosystems because they can help scientists in understanding source links and process information in marine food webs. These analyses can also be used to a certain degree in terrestrial systems. Certain isotopes can signify distinct primary producers forming the bases of food webs and trophic level positioning. The stable isotope compositions are expressed in terms of delta values (δ) in permil (‰), i.e. parts per thousand differences from a standard. They express the proportion of an isotope that is in a sample. The values are expressed as:

δX = [(R_{sample} / R_{standard}) – 1] × 10^{3}

where X represents the isotope of interest (e.g., ^{13}C) and R represents the ratio of the isotope of interest and its natural form (e.g., ^{13}C/^{12}C). Higher (or less negative) delta values indicate increases in a sample's isotope of interest, relative to the standard, and lower (or more negative) values indicate decreases. The standard reference materials for carbon, nitrogen, and sulfur are Pee Dee Belemnite limestone, nitrogen gas in the atmosphere, and Cañon Diablo meteorite respectively. Analysis is usually done using a mass spectrometer, detecting small differences between gaseous elements. Analysis of a sample can cost anywhere from $30 to $100. Stable isotopes assist scientists in analyzing animal diets and food webs by examining the animal tissues that bear a fixed isotopic enrichment or depletion vs. the diet. Muscle or protein fractions have become the most common animal tissue used to examine the isotopes because they represent the assimilated nutrients in their diet. The main advantage to using stable isotope analysis as opposed to stomach content observations is that no matter what the status is of the animal's stomach (empty or not), the isotope tracers in the tissues will give us an understanding of its trophic position and food source. The three major isotopes used in aquatic ecosystem food web analysis are ^{13}C, ^{15}N and ^{34}S. While all three indicate information on trophic dynamics, it is common to perform analysis on at least two of the previously mentioned three isotopes for better understanding of marine trophic interactions and for stronger results.

In contrast to bulk stable isotope analysis which determines the average isotopic ratio across all compounds of a tissue sample, compound-specific isotope analysis separates target compounds such as amino acids (AAs) or fatty acids before conducting stable isotope analysis on the isolated components. These components are often separated using Gas Chromatography or Liquid Chromatography prior to Isotope-Monitoring Mass Spectrometry. This approach can provide more precise tracing of molecular exchange within a food web due to each AA's different fractionization and incorporation rates (as opposed than a single averaged value provided by bulk isotope analysis) and its ability to more clearly account for isotopic routing - the unequal incorporation of prey isotope values into predator tissues. This is especially useful when trying to distinguish isotopic signatures from food sources with similar bulk isotope values such as those from related but distinct primary producers.

Within aquatic ecology, researchers often examine "source AAs" (which fractionate very little - < 0.5‰) to explore how carbon is fixed by primary producers during amino acid synthesis and "trophic AAs" (which fractionate or enrich ∼6–8‰ as they move up the food hain) to better understand trophic position, consumer-prey and host-parasite relationships, and food chain length (Table 1).

	Non-essential amino acid	Essential amino acid
Source AAs	Glycine	Phenylalanine
	Serine	Methionine
	Tyrosine	Lysine
Trophic AAs	Alanine	Isoleucine
	Aspartic acid	Leucine
	Glutamic acid	Valine
	Proline	
Metabolic AA		Threonine

Table 1: Source, trophic, and metabolic amino acids used in compound-specific stable isotope analysis.

==== Hydrogen-2 ====
The ratio of ^{2}H, also known as deuterium, to ^{1}H has been studied in both plant and animal tissue. Hydrogen isotopes in plant tissue are correlated with local water values but vary based on fractionation during photosynthesis, transpiration, and other processes in the formation of cellulose. A study on the isotope ratios of tissues from plants growing within a small area in Texas found tissues from CAM plants were enriched in deuterium relative to C4 plants. Hydrogen isotope ratios in animal tissue reflect diet, including drinking water, and have been used to study bird migration and aquatic food webs.

==== Carbon-13 ====
Carbon isotopes aid us in determining the primary production source responsible for the energy flow in an ecosystem. The transfer of ^{13}C through trophic levels remains relatively the same, except for a small increase (an enrichment < 1 ‰). Large differences of δ^{13}C between animals indicate that they have different food sources or that their food webs are based on different primary producers (i.e. different species of phytoplankton, marsh grasses.) Because δ^{13}C indicates the original source of primary producers, the isotopes can also help us determine shifts in diets, both short term, long term or permanent. These shifts may even correlate to seasonal changes, reflecting phytoplankton abundance. Scientists have found that there can be wide ranges of δ^{13}C values in phytoplankton populations over a geographic region. While it is not quite certain as to why this may be, there are several hypotheses for this occurrence. These include isotopes within dissolved inorganic carbon pools (DIC) may vary with temperature and location and that growth rates of phytoplankton may affect their uptake of the isotopes. δ^{13}C has been used in determining migration of juvenile animals from sheltered inshore areas to offshore locations by examining the changes in their diets. A study by Fry (1983) studied the isotopic compositions in juvenile shrimp of south Texas grass flats. Fry found that at the beginning of the study the shrimp had isotopic values of δ^{13}C = -11 to -14‰ and 6-8‰ for δ^{15}N and δ^{34}S. As the shrimp matured and migrated offshore, the isotopic values changed to those resembling offshore organisms (δ^{13}C= -15‰ and δ^{15}N = 11.5‰ and δ^{34}S = 16‰).

==== Sulfur-34 ====
While there is no enrichment of ^{34}S between trophic levels, the stable isotope can be useful in distinguishing benthic vs. pelagic producers and marsh vs. phytoplankton producers. Similar to ^{13}C, it can also help distinguish between different phytoplankton as the key primary producers in food webs. The differences between seawater sulfates and sulfides (c. 21‰ vs -10‰) aid scientists in the discriminations. Sulfur tends to be more plentiful in less aerobic areas, such as benthic systems and marsh plants, than the pelagic and more aerobic systems. Thus, in the benthic systems, there are smaller δ^{34}S values.

==== Nitrogen-15 ====
Nitrogen isotopes indicate the trophic level position of organisms (reflective of the time the tissue samples were taken). There is a larger enrichment component with δ^{15}N because its retention is higher than that of ^{14}N. This can be seen by analyzing the waste of organisms. Cattle urine has shown that there is a depletion of ^{15}N relative to the diet. As organisms eat each other, the ^{15}N isotopes are transferred to the predators. Thus, organisms higher in the trophic pyramid have accumulated higher levels of ^{15}N ( and higher δ^{15}N values) relative to their prey and others before them in the food web. Numerous studies on marine ecosystems have shown that on average there is a 3.2‰ enrichment of ^{15}N vs. diet between different trophic level species in ecosystems. In the Baltic sea, Hansson et al. (1997) found that when analyzing a variety of creatures (such as particulate organic matter (phytoplankton), zooplankton, mysids, sprat, smelt and herring,) there was an apparent fractionation of 2.4‰ between consumers and their apparent prey.

In addition to trophic positioning of organisms, δ^{15}N values have become commonly used in distinguishing between land derived and natural sources of nutrients. As water travels from septic tanks to aquifers, the nitrogen rich water is delivered into coastal areas. Waste-water nitrate has higher concentrations of ^{15}N than the nitrate that is found in natural soils in near shore zones. For bacteria, it is more convenient for them to uptake ^{14}N as opposed to ^{15}N because it is a lighter element and easier to metabolize. Thus, due to bacteria's preference when performing biogeochemical processes such as denitrification and volatilization of ammonia, ^{14}N is removed from the water at a faster rate than ^{15}N, resulting in more ^{15}N entering the aquifer. ^{15}N is roughly 10-20‰ as opposed to the natural ^{15}N values of 2-8‰. The inorganic nitrogen that is emitted from septic tanks and other human-derived sewage is usually in the form of $\ce{NH4+}$. Once the nitrogen enters the estuaries via groundwater, it is thought that because there is more ^{15}N entering, that there will also be more ^{15}N in the inorganic nitrogen pool delivered and that it is picked up more by producers taking up N. Even though ^{14}N is easier to take up, because there is much more ^{15}N, there will still be higher amounts assimilated than normal. These levels of δ^{15}N can be examined in creatures that live in the area and are non migratory (such as macrophytes, clams and even some fish). This method of identifying high levels of nitrogen input is becoming a more and more popular method in attempting to monitor nutrient input into estuaries and coastal ecosystems. Environmental managers have become more and more concerned about measuring anthropogenic nutrient inputs into estuaries because excess in nutrients can lead to eutrophication and hypoxic events, eliminating organisms from an area entirely.

===== Oxygen-18 =====
Analysis of the ratio of ^{18}O to ^{16}O in the shells of the Colorado Delta clam was used to assess the historical extent of the estuary in the Colorado River Delta prior to construction of upstream dams.

== Forensic science ==
A recent development in forensic science is the isotopic analysis of hair strands. Hair has a recognisable growth rate of 9-11mm per month or 15 cm per year. Human hair growth is primarily a function of diet, especially drinking water intake. The stable isotopic ratios of drinking water are a function of location, and the geology that the water percolates through. ^{87}Sr, ^{88}Sr and oxygen isotope variations are different all over the world. These differences in isotopic ratio are then biologically 'set' in our hair as it grows and it has therefore become possible to identify recent geographic histories by the analysis of hair strands. For example, it could be possible to identify whether a terrorist suspect had recently been to a particular location from hair analysis. This hair analysis is a non-invasive method which is becoming very popular in cases that DNA or other traditional means are bringing no answers.

Isotope analysis can be used by forensic investigators to determine whether two or more samples of explosives are of a common origin. Most high explosives contain carbon, hydrogen, nitrogen and oxygen atoms and thus comparing their relative abundances of isotopes can reveal the existence of a common origin. Researchers have also shown that analysis of the ^{12}C/^{13}C ratios can locate the country of origin for a given explosive.

Stable isotopic analysis has also been used in the identification of drug trafficking routes. Isotopic abundances are different in morphine grown from poppies in south-east Asia versus poppies grown in south-west Asia. The same is applied to cocaine that is derived from Bolivia and that from Colombia.

== Wildlife forensics ==
Stable isotope analysis of Carbon-14 in elephant tusks has been identified by researchers at the University of Utah, including Thure E. Cerling, as an approach to help identify elephant poaching activity, based on when the animal died.

== Traceability ==
Stable isotopic analysis has also been used for tracing the geographical origin of food, timber, and in tracing the sources and fates of nitrates in the environment.

== Hydrology ==
In isotope hydrology, stable isotopes of water (^{2}H and ^{18}O) are used to estimate the source, age, and flow paths of water flowing through ecosystems. The main effects that change the stable isotope composition of water are evaporation and condensation. Variability in water isotopes is used to study sources of water to streams and rivers, evaporation rates, groundwater recharge, and other hydrological processes.

== Paleoclimatology ==
The ratio of ^{18}O to ^{16}O in ice and deep sea cores is temperature dependent, and can be used as a proxy measure for reconstructing climate change. During colder periods of the Earth's history (glacials) such as during the ice ages, ^{16}O is preferentially evaporated from the colder oceans, leaving the slightly heavier and more sluggish ^{18}O behind. Organisms such as foraminifera which combine oxygen dissolved in the surrounding water with carbon and calcium to build their shells therefore incorporate the temperature-dependent ^{18}O to ^{16}O ratio. When these organisms die, they settle out on the sea bed, preserving a long and invaluable record of global climate change through much of the Quaternary. Similarly, ice cores on land are enriched in the heavier ^{18}O relative to ^{16}O during warmer climatic phases (interglacials) as more energy is available for the evaporation of the heavier ^{18}O isotope. The oxygen isotope record preserved in the ice cores is therefore a "mirror" of the record contained in ocean sediments.

Oxygen isotopes preserve a record of the effects of the Milankovitch cycles on climate change during the Quaternary, revealing an approximately 100,000-year cycle in the Earth's climate.
