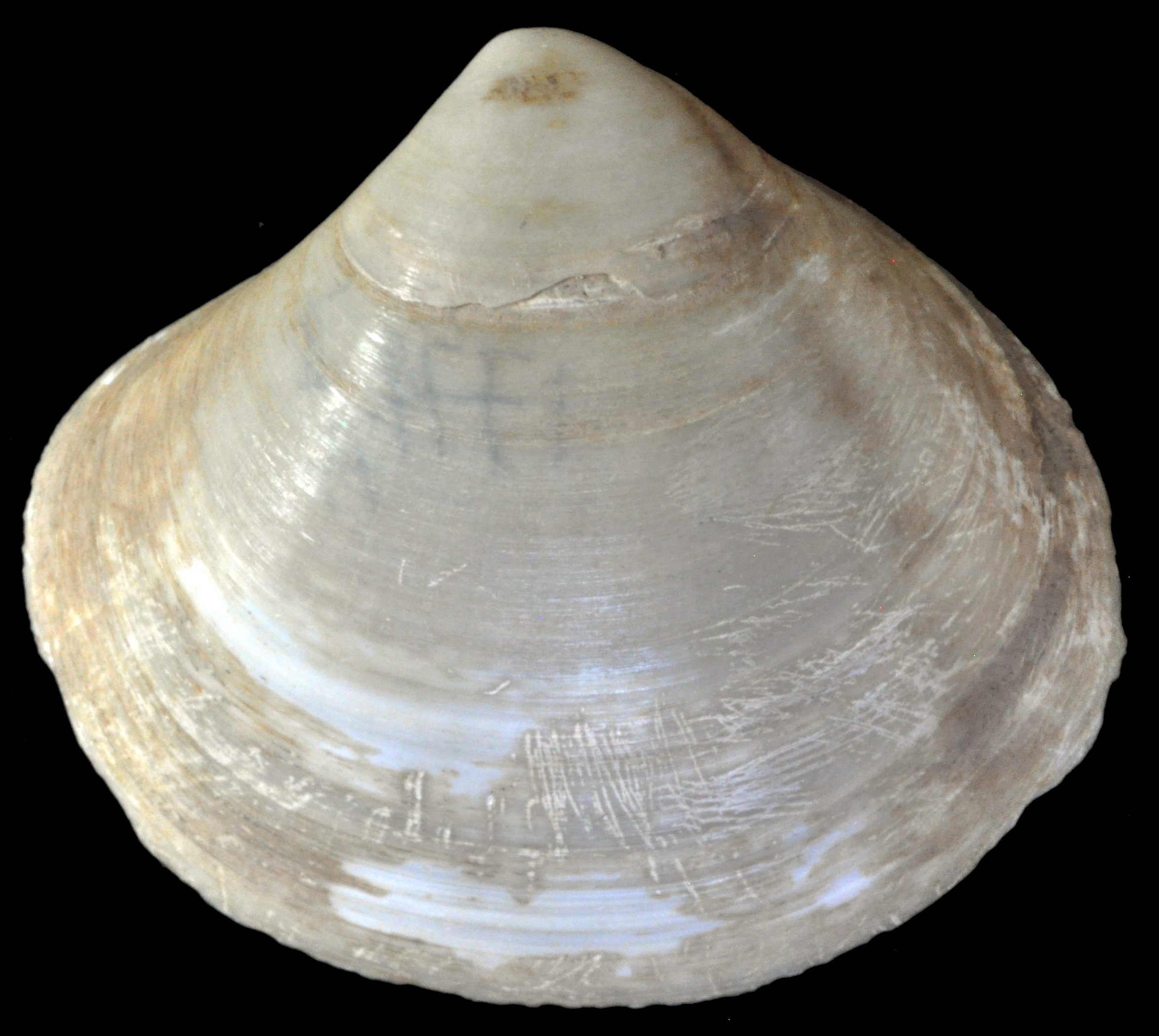
- Shell of Trinitasia iheringi (syntype at MNHN, Paris)

Scientific classification
- Kingdom: Animalia
- Phylum: Mollusca
- Class: Bivalvia
- Order: Venerida
- Superfamily: Mactroidea
- Family: Mactridae
- Genus: Trinitasia; Gray, 1853

Species
- See text.

= Trinitasia =

Genus of bivalves

Trinitasia is a genus of saltwater clams, marine bivalve mollusks in the family Mactridae.

== Species ==
- Trinitasia iheringi (Dall, 1897)

== Distribution ==
This marine species occurs off Brazil.
