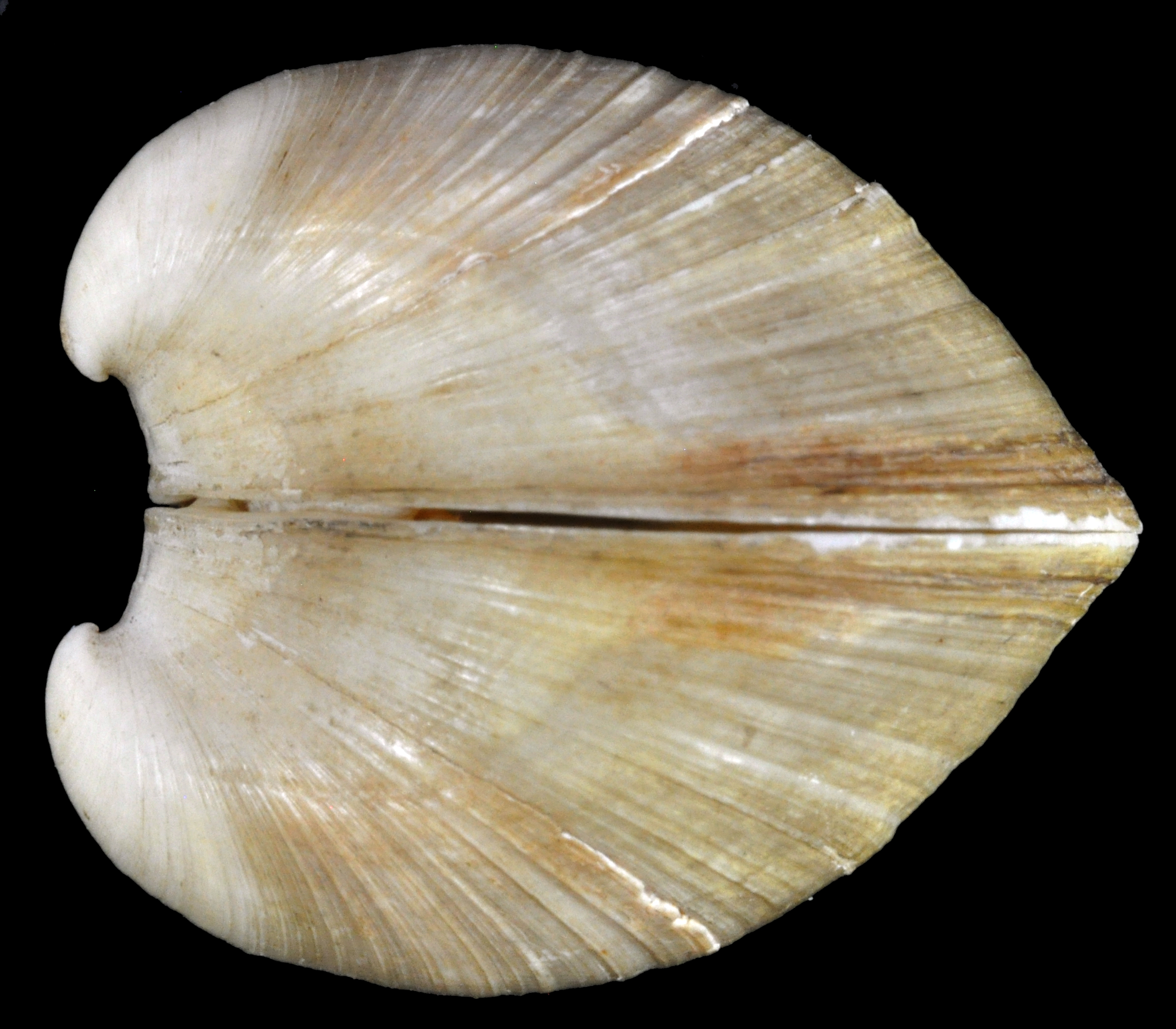
- Shell of Rangia flexuosa

Scientific classification
- Kingdom: Animalia
- Phylum: Mollusca
- Class: Bivalvia
- Order: Venerida
- Superfamily: Mactroidea
- Family: Mactridae
- Subfamily: Mactrinae
- Genus: Rangia; Desmoulins, 1832

Synonyms
- Gnathodon G.B.Sowerby I, 1832; Rangia (Rangia) Desmoulins, 1832 · alternate representation; Rangia (Rangianella) Conrad, 1868 · alternate representation; Rangianella Conrad, 1868

= Rangia (bivalve) =

Genus of bivalves

Rangia is a genus of bivalve molluscs or clams in the subfamily Mactrinae of the family Mactridae.

== Species ==
There are three species:

- Rangia cuneata (G. B. Sowerby I, 1832) – Atlantic rangia
- Rangia flexuosa (Conrad, 1840) – Brown rangia
- † Rangia johnsoni Dall, 1898
- Rangia mendica (Gould, 1851)

Synonyms

- Rangia cyrenoides Des Moulins, 1832: synonym of Rangia cuneata (G. B. Sowerby I, 1832)
