= Mactrinae =

Scientific classification
- Kingdom: Animalia
- Phylum: Mollusca
- Class: Bivalvia
- Order: Venerida
- Family: Mactridae
- Subfamily: Mactrinae; Lamarck, 1809

Genus of bivalves

Mactrinae is a subfamily of marine mollusks in the family Mactridae. Members of Mactrinae are known colloquially as surfclams. Species in Matrinae are bivalvic.

== Distribution ==
Member species of this subfamily occur worldwide and reside in the benthic zone.

== Genera ==
Genera in the subfamily include;

- Austromactra Iredale, 1930
- Barymactra Cossman, 1909
- Coelomactra Dall, 1895
- Crassula Marwick, 1948
- Cyclomactra Dall, 1895
- Diaphoromactra Iredale, 1930
- Harvella J. E. Gray, 1853
- Huberimactra Cosel & Gofas, 2018
- Leptospisula Dall, 1895
- Mactra Linnaeus, 1767
- Mactralla J. E. Gray, 1853
- Mactrellona J. G. Marks, 1951
- Mactrinula J. E. Gray, 1853
- Mactromeris Conrad, 1868
- Maorimactra H. J. Finlay, 1928
- Mulina J. E. Gray, 1837
- Oxyperas Mörch, 1853
- Rangia Des Moulins, 1832
- Scalpomactra H. J. Finlay, 1928
- Scissodesma J. E. Gray, 1837
- Simomactra Dall, 1894
- Spisula J. E. Gray, 1837 (known also as Spissula [sic])
- Standella J. E. Gray, 1853 (previously Mactroma Dall, 1894. Junior objective synonym)
- Trinitasia Maury, 1928
- Tumbeziconcha Pilsbry & Olsson, 1935
