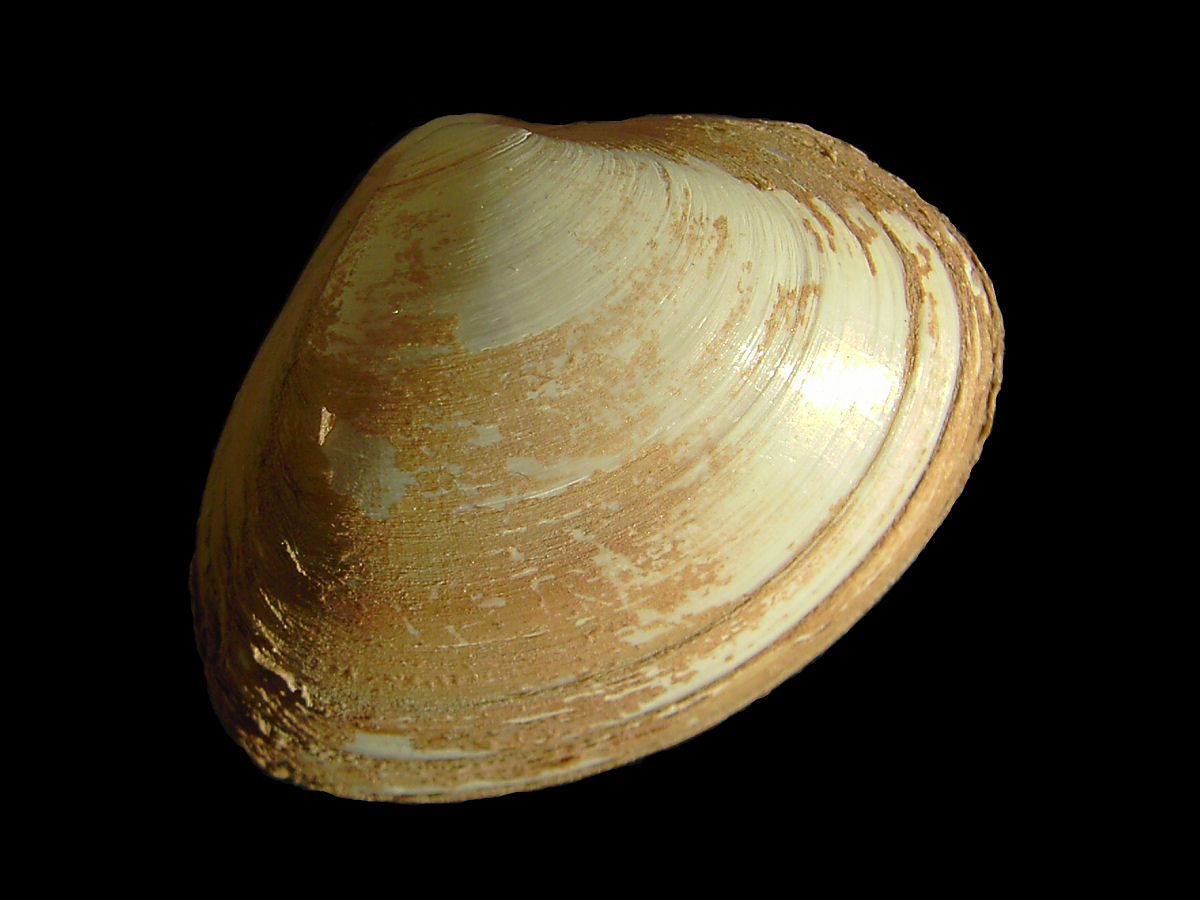
- Shell of Spisula solida

Scientific classification
- Kingdom: Animalia
- Phylum: Mollusca
- Class: Bivalvia
- Order: Venerida
- Superfamily: Mactroidea
- Family: Mactridae; Lamarck, 1809

Genera
- See text.

= Mactridae =

Mactridae Temporal range: Cretaceous to Present

Family of bivalves

Mactridae, common name the trough shells or duck clams, is a family of saltwater clams, marine bivalve mollusks in the order Venerida.

== Description ==
These clams have two short siphons, each with a horny sheath. The shell is shaped like a rounded-cornered equilateral triangle and there is a slight gape at the posterior. Each valve bears two cardinal teeth with four lateral teeth on the right valve and two on the left. The foot is white and wedge-shaped. They mostly inhabit the neritic zone.

== Ecology ==
Trough shells burrow in sand or fine gravel and never in muddy substrates.

== Subfamilies and genera ==
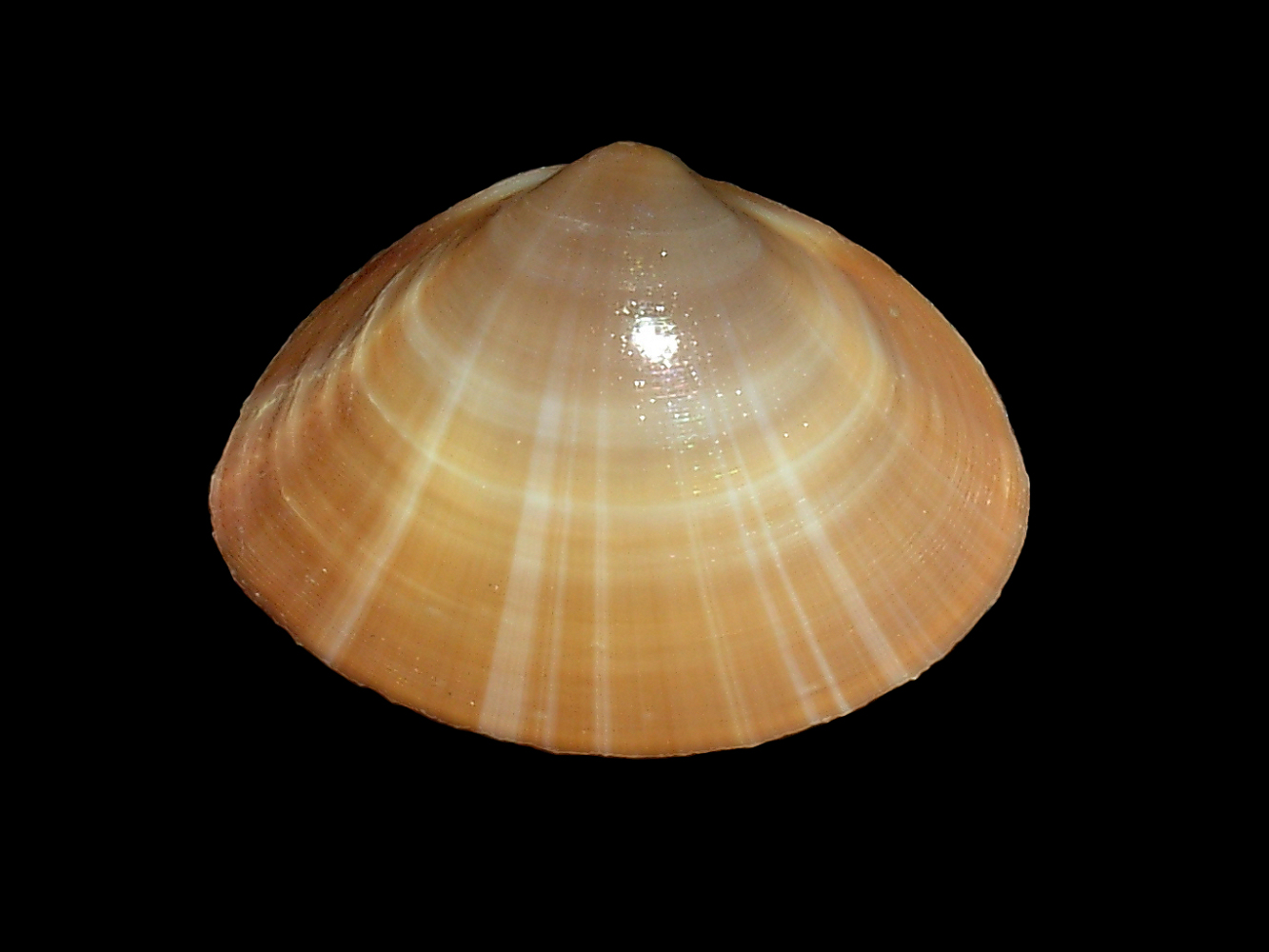
Mactra stultorum

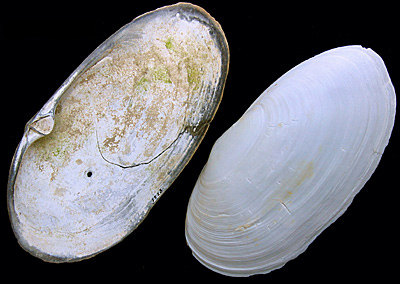
Lutraria lutraria

According to the World Register of Marine Species (2025), this family contains 56 genera and is split into the following subfamilies:

=== Subfamily Darininae ===
- †Darcinia Clark, 1946
- Darina J. E. Gray, 1853

=== Subfamily Lutrariinae ===
- Eastonia J. E. Gray, 1853
- Heterocardia Deshayes, 1855
- Lutraria Lamarck, 1799
- Meropesta Iredale, 1929
- Standella J. E. Gray, 1853
- Tresus J. E. Gray, 1853
- Zenatia J. E. Gray, 1853
- Zenatina Gill & Darragh, 1963

=== Subfamily Mactrinae ===
- †Allomactra Tomlin, 1931
- Austromactra Iredale, 1930
- Barymactra Cossmann, 1909
- Coelomactra Dall, 1895
- Crassula Marwick, 1948
- Cyclomactra Dall, 1895
- Diaphoromactra Iredale, 1930
- Harvella J. E. Gray, 1853
- Huberimactra Cosel & Gofas, 2018
- Leptospisula Dall, 1895
- Mactra Linnaeus, 1767
- Mactrella J. E. Gray, 1853
- Mactrellona J. G. Marks, 1951
- Mactrinula J. E. Gray, 1853
- Mactromeris Conrad, 1868
- Mactrotoma Dall, 1894
- Maorimactra H. J. Finlay, 1928
- Mulinia J. E. Gray, 1837
- Oxyperas Mörch, 1853
- †Pseudocardium Gabb, 1866
- Rangia Desmoulins, 1832
- †Sarmatimactra Korobkov, 1954
- Scalpomactra H. J. Finlay, 1928
- Scissodesma Gray, 1837
- Simomactra Dall, 1894
- Spisula J. E. Gray, 1837
- Trinitasia Maury, 1928
- Tumbeziconcha Pilsbry & Olsson, 1935
- Mactrona Marwick, 1952
- Petromactra Saul, 1973

=== Subfamily Resaniinae ===
- Resania J. E. Gray, 1853

=== Subfamily Tanysiphoninae ===
- Tanysiphon W. H. Benson, 1858

=== Incertae sedis ===
- †Aktschagylia Starobogatov, 1970
- †Aliomactra Stephenson, 1952
- †Andrussella Korobkov, 1954
- †Avimactra Andrusov, 1905
- †Caspimactra A. A. Ali-Zade & Kabakova, 1969
- †Chersonimactra Paramonova, 1978
- †Cryptomactra Andrussow, 1902
- †Cymbophora Gabb, 1869
- †Eopapyrina Woodring, 1982
- †Geltena Stephenson, 1946
- †Ionesimactra Signorelli, 2023
- †Kirghizella Andrusov, 1902
- †Mactrodesma Conrad, 1869
- Mactrona Marwick, 1952
- †Mulinoides Olsson, 1944
- †Nelltia Stephenson, 1952
- †Nymphactra Stilwell & Zinsmeister, 1992
- †Ovamactra Woodring, 1982
- Petromactra Saul, 1973
- †Planimactra Ionesi, 1986
- †Podolimactra Ionesi, 1986
- †Praerangia Cossmann, 1908
- †Priscomactra Stephenson, 1952
- †Pseudomactra Steklov, 1960
- †Pteroluter Saul, 1973
- †Stereomactra Stewart, 1930
- †Stiphromactra Böhm, 1929
- †Tenuimactra Garvie, 1996
- †Willimactra Saul, 1973
- †Zenatiopsis Tate, 1880
