= Kaiaua =

Rural settlement in Waikato, New Zealand

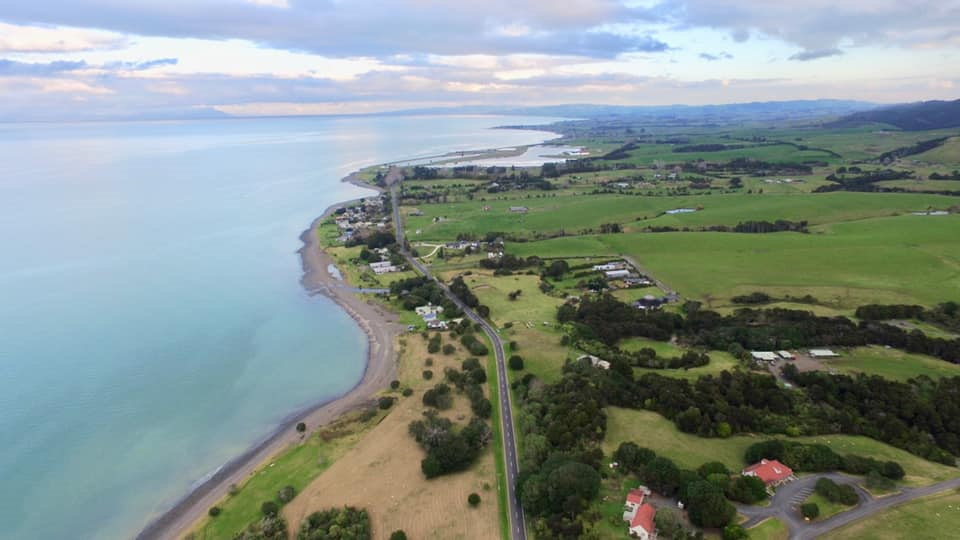
- Coastline at Whakatīwai, with Kaiaua in far distance
- Interactive map of Kaiaua
- Coordinates: 37.111°S 175.296°E
- Country: New Zealand
- Region: Waikato region
- District: Hauraki District
- Ward: Plains Ward
- Electorates: Coromandel; Hauraki-Waikato (Māori)

Government
  - Territorial Authority: Hauraki District Council
  - Regional council: Waikato Regional Council
  - Mayor of Hauraki: Toby Adams
  - Coromandel MP: Scott Simpson
  - Hauraki-Waikato MP: Hana-Rawhiti Maipi-Clarke

Area
  - Total: 4.67 km^{2} (1.80 sq mi)

Population (June 2025)
  - Total: 510
  - Density: 110/km^{2} (280/sq mi)
- Postcode(s): 2473

Kaiaua is a small coastal settlement on the Seabird Coast, on the western shore of the Firth of Thames, in the Hauraki District and Waikato region of New Zealand's North Island. It is 80km (60 minutes drive) from Auckland.

== Name ==
The name of the settlement is of Māori origin, meaning "Eating mullets" (kai: to eat; aua: mullet or herrings) relating to the good fishing grounds in the area. Kaiaua was known as 'New Brighton' by the early settlers but the name was changed to Kaiaua in 1897.

== History ==
The township of Kaiaua is located upon a larger block of land called Opita. This block commences at the foreshore in front of the Kaiaua settlement and reaches inland to a point called Opita, the elevated inland area behind Kaiaua township (on the road to Mangatangi). The Opita block was first investigated by the Native Land Court in 1869 following an application by Hamiora Te Rangituaatea of Ngāti Paoa in 1868. A certificate of title was subsequently awarded to Te Rangituaatea and others of Ngāti Paoa.

During the 1870s, the block was sold to two brothers: Thomas Edmund Smith and William Alfred Smith. Following this sale, the establishment of Kaiaua township began. By 1885, various survey plans show a hotel, a race course and other amenities. By 1888, a small school had been established.

The sale of the Opita block included an agreement to set aside and protect a ’burial ground’ near the mouth of the Hauarahi stream. Unfortunately, this agreement was not observed as the burial ground was included in the Opita block and in later land transactions. This prompted approaches by Pōkaitara Wikiriwhi of Ngāti Paoa to the Native Minister in the 1930s seeking protection.

== Tourism ==
The Hauraki Rail Trail officially starts at Kaiaua and traces the coastline south along the Firth of Thames, over chenier shell banks and through wetlands of international significance. It is one of the Great Rides of the New Zealand Cycle Trail system The route incorporates a coastal bird watching area and Miranda Hot Springs.

The area is popular with campers and there is a designated freedom camping area just north of the Kaiaua village.

A boat-ramp is also available for fishing enthusiasts.

== Notable features ==
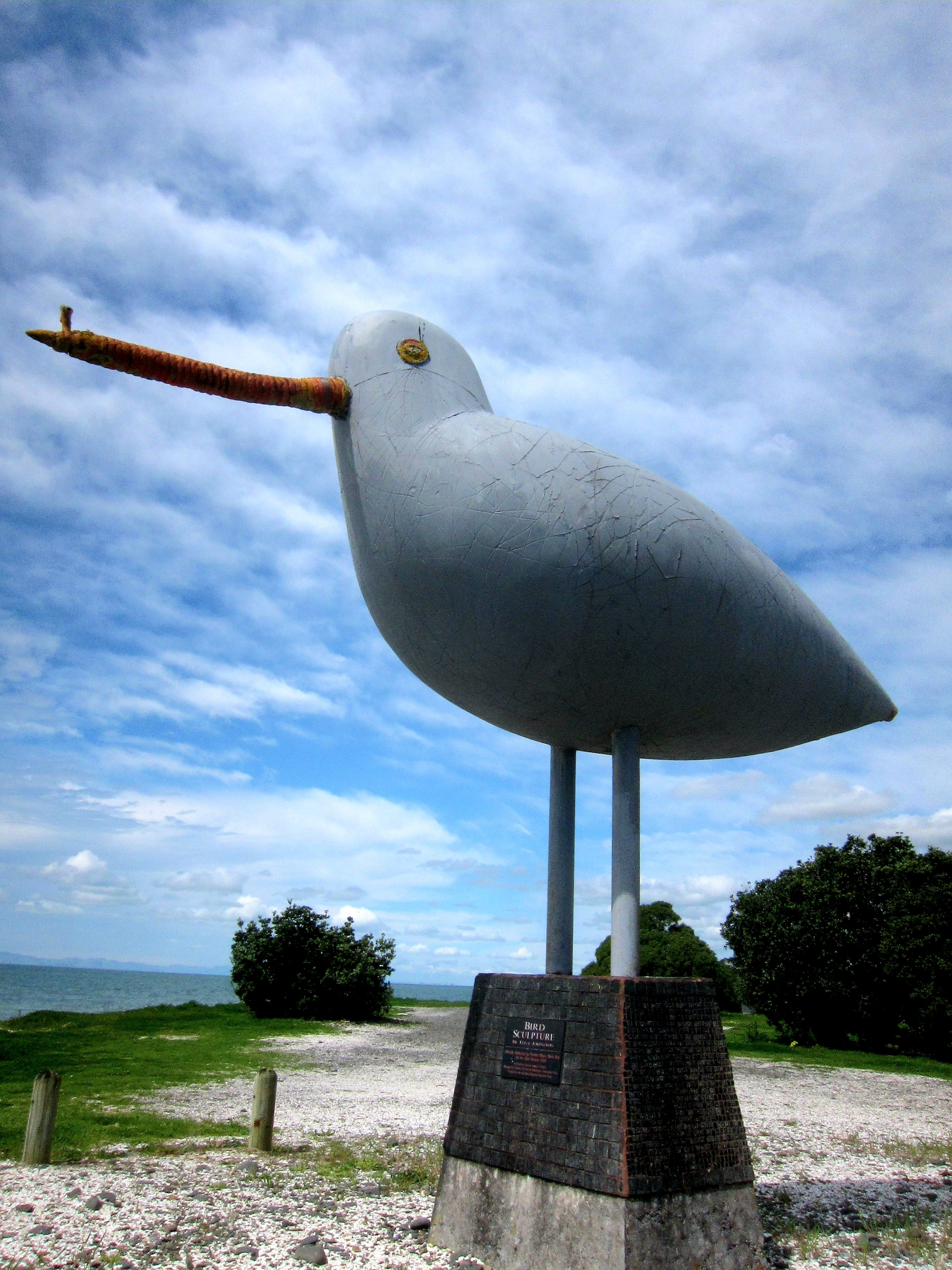
Torea Mangu Oystercatcher sculpture, at Kaiaua, New Zealand

The Torea Mangu Oystercatcher sculpture is the world's largest sculpture of an oystercatcher. It stands between the Pink Shop Seaside Store and Kaiaua School. Over 4 metres long and 3.5 metres tall, the 2.5 ton bird is constructed of ferro-cement. The sculpture is by local artist Tony Johnston and represents the mother of all oystercatchers. In Māori 'torea mangu' means black oystercatcher. Erected facing north east, the direction of prevailing winds, the sculpture symbolises the wildlife of The Firth of Thames.

== Demographics ==
Kaiaua is defined by Statistics New Zealand as a rural settlement which includes Whakatīwai. It covers 4.67 km^{2} (1.80 sq mi) and had an estimated population of 510 as of June 2025, with a population density of 109 people per km^{2}. It is part of the larger Miranda-Pūkorokoro statistical area.

Historical population
| Year | Pop. | ±% p.a. |
|---|---|---|
| 2006 | 339 | — |
| 2013 | 411 | +2.79% |
| 2018 | 429 | +0.86% |
| 2023 | 504 | +3.27% |

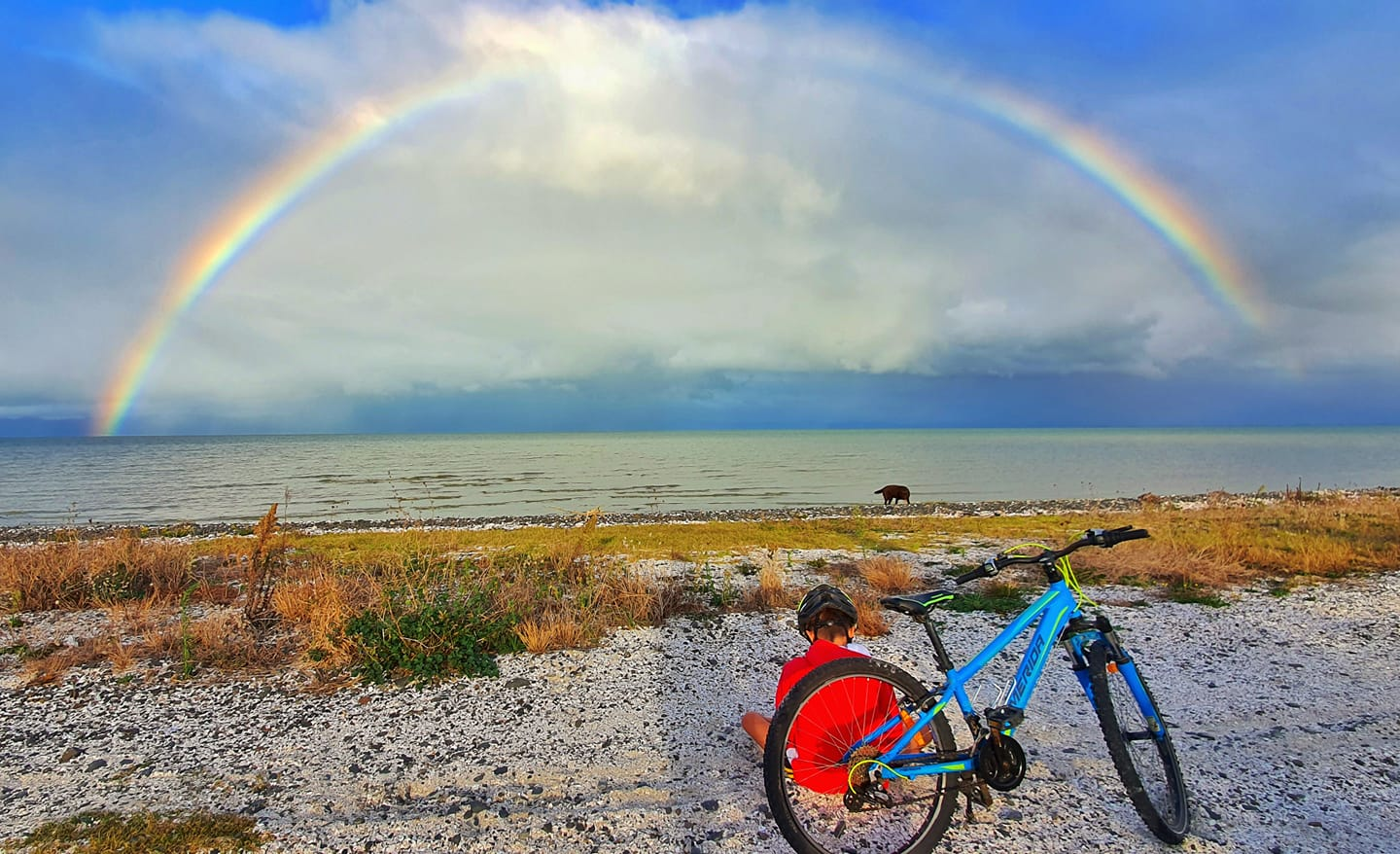
Hauraki Rail Trail at Kaiaua

Kaiaua had a population of 504 in the 2023 New Zealand census, an increase of 75 people (17.5%) since the 2018 census, and an increase of 93 people (22.6%) since the 2013 census. There were 258 males, 246 females and 3 people of other genders in 222 dwellings. 1.2% of people identified as LGBTIQ+. The median age was 53.5 years (compared with 38.1 years nationally). There were 78 people (15.5%) aged under 15 years, 48 (9.5%) aged 15 to 29, 225 (44.6%) aged 30 to 64, and 150 (29.8%) aged 65 or older.

People could identify as more than one ethnicity. The results were 78.6% European (Pākehā), 36.3% Māori, 4.2% Pasifika, 1.8% Asian, and 6.5% other, which includes people giving their ethnicity as "New Zealander". English was spoken by 98.8%, Māori language by 5.4%, and other languages by 3.6%. No language could be spoken by 1.2% (e.g. too young to talk). The percentage of people born overseas was 8.9, compared with 28.8% nationally.

Religious affiliations were 29.2% Christian, 0.6% Māori religious beliefs, 0.6% New Age, and 0.6% other religions. People who answered that they had no religion were 58.9%, and 11.3% of people did not answer the census question.

Of those at least 15 years old, 51 (12.0%) people had a bachelor's or higher degree, 240 (56.3%) had a post-high school certificate or diploma, and 135 (31.7%) people exclusively held high school qualifications. The median income was $28,700, compared with $41,500 nationally. 36 people (8.5%) earned over $100,000 compared to 12.1% nationally. The employment status of those at least 15 was that 162 (38.0%) people were employed full-time, 72 (16.9%) were part-time, and 12 (2.8%) were unemployed.

== Education ==
Kaiaua School was first established in 1883. It is a co-educational state primary school, with a roll of 39 as of July 2026.

The EcoQuest Education Foundation is a Private Training Establishment established in 1999. It provides residential courses for US students through a partnership with the University of New Hampshire in the United States of America. Its campus is located in Whakatīwai.

== Māori ==
Kaiaua is located within the traditional homelands of the iwi (tribe) called Ngāti Paoa. They maintain a marae (tribal centre including a carved meeting house) called Wharekawa at Whakatīwai. This is shared with the closely related people of Ngāti Whanaunga whose lands are located to the north of Kaiaua.

Māori settlement has been continuous and unbroken in the Kaiaua area and coast for over 600 years. The ocean going ancestral vessel called Tainui travelled from central Polynesia and landed at Waihīhī, north of Kaiaua, in approximately 1350AD. Tainui peoples have lived in the area since that time leading to the presence of Ngāti Paoa and Ngāti Whanaunga today (both Tainui tribes).

Notable pā (traditional villages) of the district include Tikiore on the Whakatīwai stream, Hauārahi in Kaiaua itself and Rangipō to the south of Kaiaua. There are many more.

Other sites of significance include the Tauwhare Koiora reserve at the mouth of the Hauārahi stream and numerous urupā (cemeteries) located along the coast both on low lying sites adjacent to the sea (such as the Whakatīwai urupā) and on inland, elevated areas.
