= Responses to the COVID-19 pandemic in September 2021 =

Aspect of viral disease pandemic

This article documents the chronology of the response to the COVID-19 pandemic in September 2021, which originated in Wuhan, China in December 2019. Some developments may become known or fully understood only in retrospect. Reporting on this pandemic began in December 2019.

== Reactions and measures in the United Nations ==
=== 1 September ===
- The World Health Organization is currently monitoring a new type of COVID-19 variant first identified in Colombia, known as the Mu variant.

== Reactions and measures in Africa ==
=== 21 September ===
Zimbabwe makes vaccination mandatory for government workers.

== Reactions and measures in the Americas ==
=== 10 September ===
- United States President Joe Biden has announced a COVID-19 action plan to boost vaccination rates in the United States. Key provisions include requiring all employers with 100+ employees to be vaccinated or tested weekly, requiring all federal employees and contractors to be vaccinated, and for healthcare workers at facilities receiving Medicare and Medicaid funds to be vaccinated.

=== 15 September ===
- Panama begins offering AstraZeneca COVID vaccines to tourists to promote tourism.

== Reactions and measures in Europe ==
=== 22 September ===
- Russia announces travel packages for vaccine tourism.

== Reactions and measures in South, East and Southeast Asia ==
=== 1 September ===
- Singapore announces reopening the following week.

=== 7 September ===
- Malaysian Minister of International Trade and Industry Mohamed Azmin Ali announced that Malaysia would start treating the COVID-19 pandemic as an endemic disease from late October 2021 due to the country's high vaccination rate.

=== 22 September ===
- Malaysian Prime Minister Ismail Sabri Yaakob announced that interstate travel and tourist destinations would be allowed to resume once at least 90% of the Malaysian adult population had been vaccinated against COVID-19.

=== 24 September ===
- Malaysian National Recovery Council chairman Muhyiddin Yassin confirmed that Malaysia and Singapore would recognise each other's vaccination certificates in order to facilitate movement between the two countries.

=== 27 September ===
- New Zealand Zespri kiwifruits were pulled from Chinese supermarket selves after a batch of fruit being sold at a supermarket in China's Jiangsu province tested positive for COVID-19. In response, Zespri confirmed that it had launched emergency management plans and that the New Zealand Government was supporting its discussions with Chinese authorities.

== Reactions and measures in the Western Pacific ==
=== 2 September ===
- New Zealand Prime Minister Jacinda Ardern has confirmed that the Northland region, north of Auckland, would move to Alert Level 3 at 11:59 pm on 2 September since wastewater testing indicated no trace of COVID-19 in the region.

=== 4 September ===
- The Fijian Government has announced that only fully vaccinated travellers will be allowed to enter the country in November 2021 when borders are expected to reopen. The only exceptions will be emergencies.
- The Congress of New Caledonia unanimously voted to make COVID-19 vaccines compulsory. The new law, which will come into effect when it is gazetted, allows French authorities (who control the territory's border) to order anyone entering New Caledonia to be fully vaccinated.

=== 6 September ===
- In response to the detection of three Delta variant community cases, New Caledonia has imposed a lockdown and closed schools throughout the territory.
- New Zealand Prime Minister Ardern has confirmed that all of New Zealand except Auckland will move to Alert Level 2 at 11:59pm on 7 September. However, new Level 2 restrictions will be introduced including mandatory mask wearing at most public venues, recommended mask wearing for school students above the age of 12 years, a 50 person limit and two-metre space at indoor venues, and a 100 person limit at outdoor venues.

=== 9 September ===
- The New Caledonian government has appealed for all medical and paramedical personnel including veterinarians to assist in efforts to combat COVID-19.
- New Zealand purchased 250,000 extra doses of the Pfizer vaccine from Spain. The first shipment is due to arrive on 10 September. In addition, Prime Minister Ardern confirmed that New Zealand would receive 1.8 million Pfizer doses throughout September.

=== 10 September ===
- New Caledonian members of the French Parliament have appealed for France to send more medical personnel to the territory due to a shortage of specialists at hospital intensive care units.

=== 12 September ===
- New Zealand purchased 500,000 Pfizer doses from Denmark. The first shipment is due to arrive in the middle of the following week.

=== 13 September ===
- New Zealand Prime Minister Ardern confirmed that the Auckland Region would remain on Alert Level 4 until 11:59 pm at 21 September. In addition, the rest of New Zealand would remain on Alert Level 2 until at least 21 September.

=== 14 September ===
- The French High Commissioner Patrice Faure has imposed a curfew on New Caledonia between 9pm and 5am in response to the territory's Delta outbreak. Local tabac presse (newsagency shops) were required to close but supermarkets were allowed to remain open.

=== 16 September ===
- The New Zealand Ministry of Health announced that all essential workers crossing the Auckland border from 17 September will have to show that they have had a COVID-19 test in the previous seven days.

=== 17 September ===
- New Zealand Education Minister Chris Hipkins confirmed that there would be no changes to the end of the year school holiday dates across the country.

=== 18 September ===
- New Caledonian authorities have extended the territory's lockdown and 9:00 pm to 5:00 am curfew until 4 October 2021.

=== 20 September ===
- New Zealand Prime Minister Jacinda Ardern confirmed that Auckland would move down to Alert Level 3 at 11:59 pm on 21 September while the rest of the country will remain on Alert Level 2. In addition, a "bespoke" lockdown requirement was established in Whakatīwai, Waikato due to recent community cases there.

=== 21 September ===
- The Republic of Fiji Military Forces has adopted a "no jab, no job" policy, with staff who refuse to receive a COVID-19 vaccine being issued with termination notices.

=== 22 September ===
- New Zealand Director-General of Health Ashley Bloomfield confirmed that Waikato's Whakatīwai region would be moving into Alert Level 3 due to the high level of testing and negative community cases in the region.

=== 27 September ===
- New Zealand Prime Minister Jacinda Ardern has announced that the Government will be trialing a home isolation programme for 150 selected travellers. In addition, Ardern confirmed that the quarantine-free travel for Pacific Recognised Seasonal Employer workers from Vanuatu, Samoa, and Tonga would resume in early October.
- New Zealand Health minister Andrew Little has announced that the Government will inject NZ$400,000 in funding for youth mental health services, with priority being given to the Auckland and Northland regions due to the stress and anxiety among young people caused by the Delta community outbreak the previous month.

== See also ==
- Timeline of the COVID-19 pandemic in September 2021
- Responses to the COVID-19 pandemic
