= Stuart Chambers =

Stuart Chambers may refer to:

- Stuart Chambers (ornithologist)
- Stuart Chambers (businessman)
