= Whakatīwai =

Coastal settlement in Hauraki District, New Zealand

- Locality
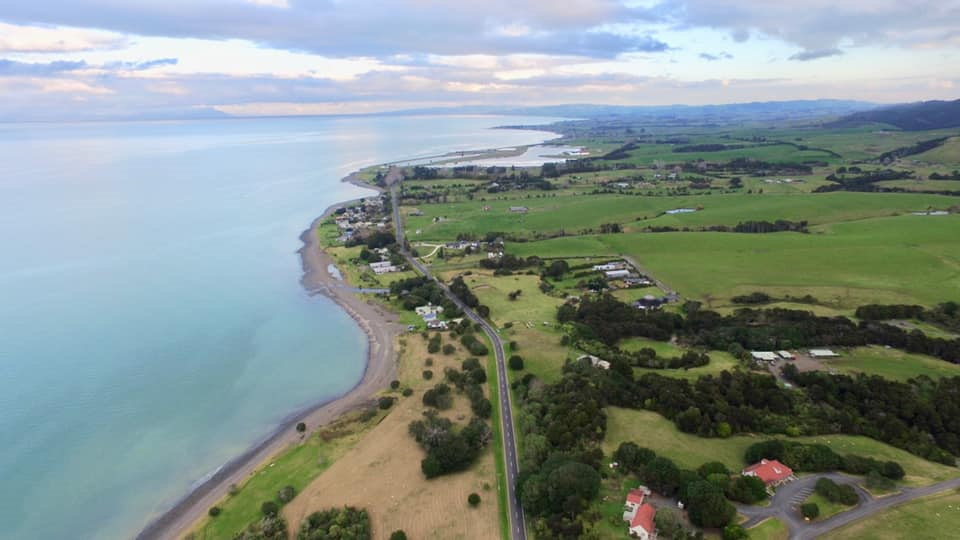
- Whakatīwai, looking south towards Kaiaua and Pūkorokoro / Miranda
- Interactive map of Whakatīwai
- Coordinates: 37°5′S 175°18′E
- Country: New Zealand
- Region: Waikato
- District: Hauraki District
- Ward: Plains Ward
- Electorates: Coromandel; Hauraki-Waikato (Māori)

Government
  - Territorial Authority: Hauraki District Council
  - Regional council: Waikato Regional Council
  - Mayor of Thames-Coromandel: Peter Revell
  - Coromandel MP: Scott Simpson
  - Hauraki-Waikato MP: Hana-Rawhiti Maipi-Clarke

Area
  - Total: 3.06 km^{2} (1.18 sq mi)

Population (2023 Census)
  - Total: 240
  - Density: 78/km^{2} (200/sq mi)
- Time zone: UTC+12 (NZST)
  - Summer (DST): UTC+13 (NZDT)
- Postcode: 2473
- Area code: 09

Whakatīwai is a locality on the Seabird Coast on the western shore of the Firth of Thames, in the Hauraki District, New Zealand. Whakatīwai is the location of Wharekawa Marae, which holds importance for Ngāti Paoa and Ngāti Whanaunga. Whakatīwai Regional Park is just north of Whakatīwai. Until 2010, Whakatīwai was a part of the Franklin District. Because it was previously considered a part of the Auckland region, the Whakatīwai Regional Park continues to be owned and operated by the Auckland Council.

== History ==
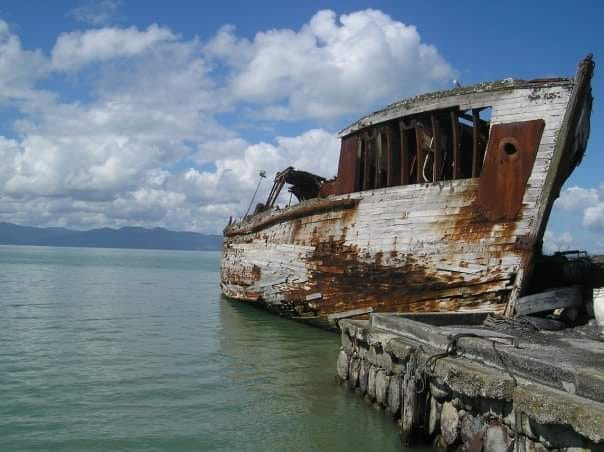
Wreck of the deliberately beached HMNZS Hinau

Whakatīwai is the site where the Tainui ancestor Hotunui settled, after exiling himself from the Kāwhia Harbour. Hotunui's son Marutūahu established a pā at Whakatīwai, and Marutūahu's sons became the ancestors of the five tribes of the Marutūāhu collective. Whakatīwai became a settlement of Ngāti Pāoa, one of the Marutūāhu tribes, and is called the poutokomanawa ("heart post") of the Ngāti Paoa rohe. During the Musket Wars in 1821, the Ngāti Pāoa settlement at Whakatīwai was sacked. Ngāti Pāoa continued to live in the area, and in 1827 Ngāti Pāoa sheltered Apihai Te Kawau, paramount chief of Ngāti Whātua, at Whakatīwai during the war. In 1874, Ngāti Pāoa held a great hui at Whakatīwai for over 3,000 delegates to finalise the plans for opening the Ohinemuri goldfields in the Karangahake Gorge, at which speakers included crown negotiator James Mackay and numerous leading Hauraki Māori.

In the early 20th century, Whakatīwai was predominantly Māori, while Kaiaua directly to the south was predominantly Pākehā. Because of this, the Kaiaua School was moved to a location central for both townships in the 1930s.

HMNZS Hinau (T17), a minesweeper from World War II, was beached at Stevenson's gravel quarry in the mid-1950s to serve as a breakwater. A photograph of the wreck featured on the cover of The Islander, a record album by Dave Dobbyn.

== Demographics ==
Whakatīwai is in an SA1 statistical area which covers 3.06 km^{2} (1.18 sq mi) and includes the area between Kaiaua School and Wharekawa Marae, but does not include Whakatīwai Regional Park or the Hinau wreck. The SA1 area is included in Kaiaua's demographics, and part of the larger Miranda-Pūkorokoro statistical area.

Historical population
Year	Pop.	±% p.a.
2006	156	—
2013	177	+1.82%
2018	183	+0.67%
2023	240	+5.57%

The SA1 statistical area had a population of 240 in the 2023 New Zealand census, an increase of 57 people (31.1%) since the 2018 census, and an increase of 63 people (35.6%) since the 2013 census. There were 120 males, 114 females and 3 people of other genders in 102 dwellings. 3.8% of people identified as LGBTIQ+. The median age was 52.1 years (compared with 38.1 years nationally). There were 42 people (17.5%) aged under 15 years, 24 (10.0%) aged 15 to 29, 111 (46.2%) aged 30 to 64, and 60 (25.0%) aged 65 or older.

People could identify as more than one ethnicity. The results were 76.2% European (Pākehā), 41.2% Māori, 6.2% Pasifika, 2.5% Asian, and 2.5% other, which includes people giving their ethnicity as "New Zealander". English was spoken by 98.8%, Māori language by 7.5%, and other languages by 5.0%. No language could be spoken by 1.2% (e.g. too young to talk). New Zealand Sign Language was known by 1.2%. The percentage of people born overseas was 6.2, compared with 28.8% nationally.

Religious affiliations were 27.5% Christian. People who answered that they had no religion were 61.2%, and 10.0% of people did not answer the census question.

Of those at least 15 years old, 27 (13.6%) people had a bachelor's or higher degree, 114 (57.6%) had a post-high school certificate or diploma, and 57 (28.8%) people exclusively held high school qualifications. The median income was $28,800, compared with $41,500 nationally. 21 people (10.6%) earned over $100,000 compared to 12.1% nationally. The employment status of those at least 15 was that 81 (40.9%) people were employed full-time, 30 (15.2%) were part-time, and 3 (1.5%) were unemployed.
