= Pūkorokoro Miranda Naturalists' Trust =

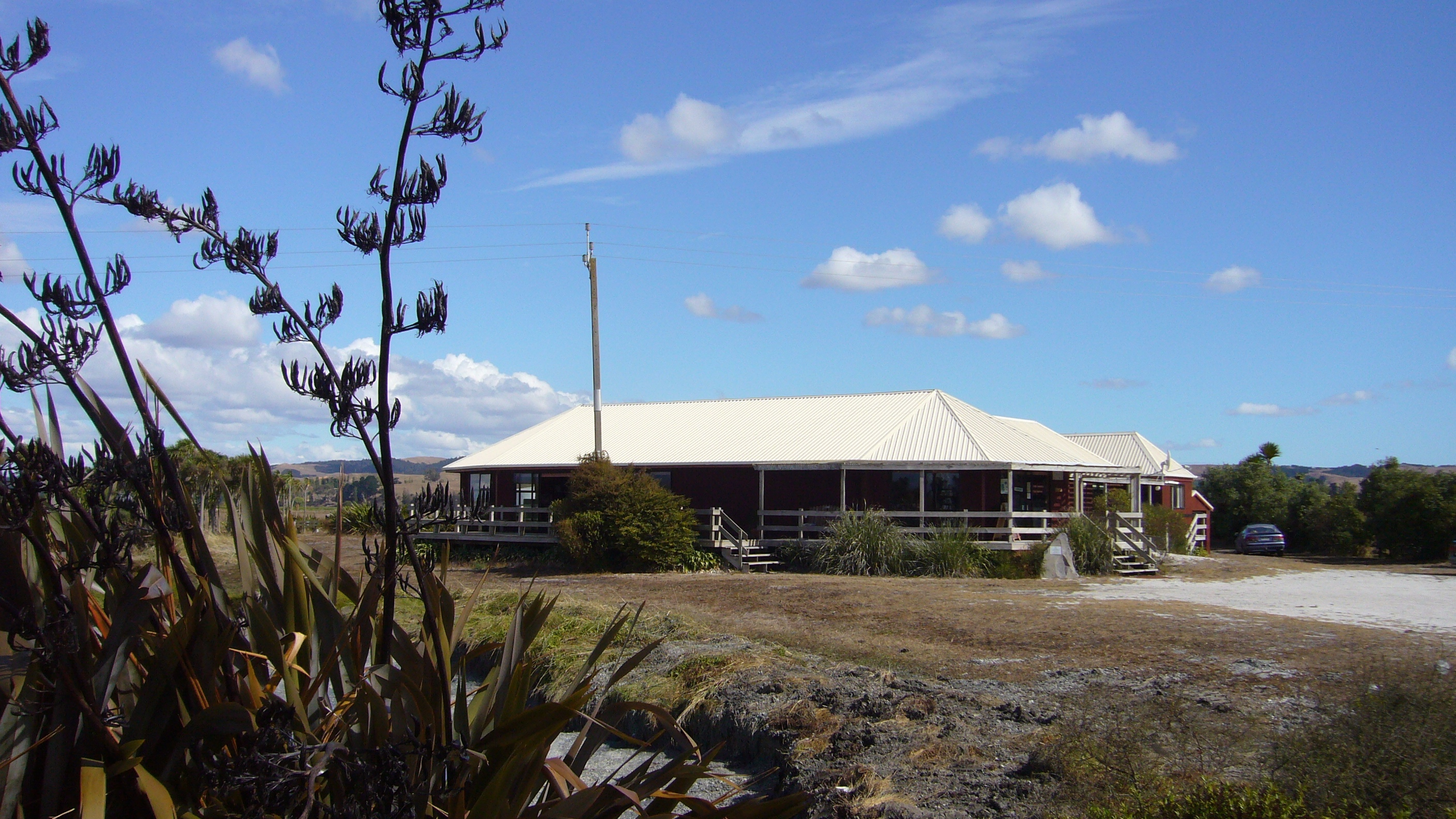
Miranda Shorebird Centre

The Miranda Naturalists' Trust is a charitable trust, that established and maintains the Pūkorokoro Shorebird Centre, located at Pūkorokoro / Miranda on the western shore of the Firth of Thames on the North Island of New Zealand. The Pūkorokoro Miranda Naturalists' Trust (PMNT) was formed in 1975 to encourage people to visit the coastline and appreciate its wide range of flora and fauna. The trust promotes education and public awareness of coastal ecology, shorebird research and conservation. Work done by the trust, to increase knowledge of shorebird migration, includes bird banding, research and data exchange. The Shorebird Centre has information displays on waders and a library and helps raise funds for the trust's work through their shop sales and visitor accommodation.

== Miranda ==
Pūkorokoro Miranda is on the western shore of Tīkapa Moana the Firth of Thames where the Hauraki Plains drains into the Hauraki Gulf. The wetlands of the Firth of Thames consist of extensive intertidal mudflats (about 8500 hectares), which are the feeding grounds for flocks of migratory wading birds. Along the Pūkorokoro Miranda coast, a chenier plain with large shell banks formed over the past 4500 years, and provides roosting areas for the waders at high tide. It is one of the most significant Holocene coastal strand plains in the world.

In 1990 the area was listed as a wetland of international importance under the Ramsar Convention.

== History ==
The Pūkorokoro Miranda Naturalists' Trust was established in 1975 by a group of Auckland-based birdwatchers. One of them was Richard B. Sibson. He had arrived in Auckland from England in 1939 to take up a position as a classics' master with King's College at Middlemore. He was a keen birdwatcher, making bicycle tours to the Firth of Thames in the 1940s, e.g. in 1942 with a group of students from King's College. At Pūkorokoro Miranda, at the site of a then operating limeworks, he discovered a bird high-tide roost with bar-tailed godwits (Limosa lapponica), wrybills (Anarhynchus frontalis) and South Island pied oystercatchers (Haematopus ostralegus). Other founders of the MNT were author and naturalist Ronald Lockley and Beth Brown. Beth was later to become the South Auckland representative and the first woman president of the Ornithological Society.

In 1973 Beth Brown had the first serious thoughts about the building of a birders' lodge near a wading bird roost. Pūkorokoro Miranda provided a good spot as here birds could always be seen within walking distance. The plan was put to a meeting of Auckland members of the Ornithological Society in March 1974. Here a committee was set up to bring the idea to practice. Later in the year the idea developed into establishing a "wildlife trust".

=== 1975: registration of the trust ===
In 1975 the Miranda Naturalists' Trust (original name) was registered as a charitable trust and the first president of the trust was John Brown.

The Trust's constitution lists as its main objects:

- To establish and maintain an observatory for the study of natural history, especially birds, in the Firth of Thames and adjacent areas.
- To collect information on the ecology of the Miranda Coast with a view to its conservation.
- To encourage and promote education for the greater knowledge and enjoyment of the natural life heritage of New Zealand.

The first donations were acquired, and a fund-raising campaign was started. An "Inaugural Appeal" letter was circulated, stating that "an Observatory should be set up at Miranda to maintain and amplify the study of birds in the Firth". This letter also spoke of the hope that "the lodge could be an established fact by mid-winter 1975". Elaine Power painted a New Zealand dotterel (Charadrius obscurus) for the Trust, which was sold in print in a limited edition, signed by the artist, and Richard Adams, author of Watership Down, made a fundraising speech, when he visited Auckland.

In 1976 Dick Sibson was elected chairman of the Trust. Important donations were received from Mobil Oil NZ, the Ornithological Society of New Zealand, the J.R. McKenzie Trust and the Recreation and Sport Fund. In that same year "the first of the problems arose". An application for permission to build an observatory and lodge on the site of the old lime-works was turned down.

Finally, the problems would not be solved until the end of the 1980s. In 1986 the Trust, still looking for a place to erect a building, changed focus to the west side of the Miranda to Kaiaua Road. Then the process got into a higher speed, and within a couple of years the building actually starts.

=== 1990: opening of the centre ===
Mid January 1990 the builders arrive and on 29 September 1990 the Miranda Naturalists' Trust Centre on the road from Miranda to Kaiaua was officially opened with a dedication ceremony with Ngati Paoa, the tāngata whenua of Pukorokoro, Taramaire and Kaiaua. About 110 members and visitors assembled outside the gates of the centre at daybreak at 6 am. They were called on to the site by a karanga and the blessing (te karakia) and the greetings (te mihi) took place. Once in the building speeches of welcome from both sides, following marae etiquette were held. These speeches were followed by waiata (singing).

One of the waiata had the following text:

Ka haere mai ano nga kuaka
Ka kite ano – te iwi pakeha
Ka kite ano – te tangata whenua
Na tatou katoa – Pukorokoro nei

Welcome again the godwits
For the Pakeha to see
For the first people to see
For Miranda is for all

Then the Miranda Trust executive council members welcomed the tāngata whenua to the opening ceremony. The early start and the procedures at this day were chosen, to show that the trust was conscious to be in fact guests on the ancestral lands of Te Tangata Whenua. Following breakfast the tangata whenua left and Rev. Richard Fenton conducted a small dedication ceremony. Following this ceremony a number of speakers performed, among whom Sir Peter Elworthy, chairman of the Queen Elizabeth II National Trust and Professor Max Maddock, from the University of Newcastle (NSW), chairman of the Shortland Wetlands Centre.

In the same year a $50,000 grant from the N.Z. Lottery Grants Board was received, which allowed the building of new rooms at the centre.

=== Recent developments ===
In 1992 John Gale, a recently retired Auckland businessman, became honorary full-time manager of the centre. From then on the centre could be open permanently for all hours. This only lasted for sixteen weeks however, when John left for a visit to England. It then became clear that a full-time centre manager was a prime necessity for the future. The next year a full-time manager was appointed, paid with funding from "Task Force Green", a government agency involved with subsidising employment of people.

John Gale would then become member of the executive council of the trust and subsequently chairman (until 1998).

In 1993 the land surrounding the former lime-works were brought under the protection of a QE II National Trust Covenant. The area was called the "Robert Findlay Wildlife Area", to commemorate that the Findlay and Lane family (subsequent generations) have allowed birdwatchers unimpeded access over the land ever since arriving and first purchasing the land in 1869.

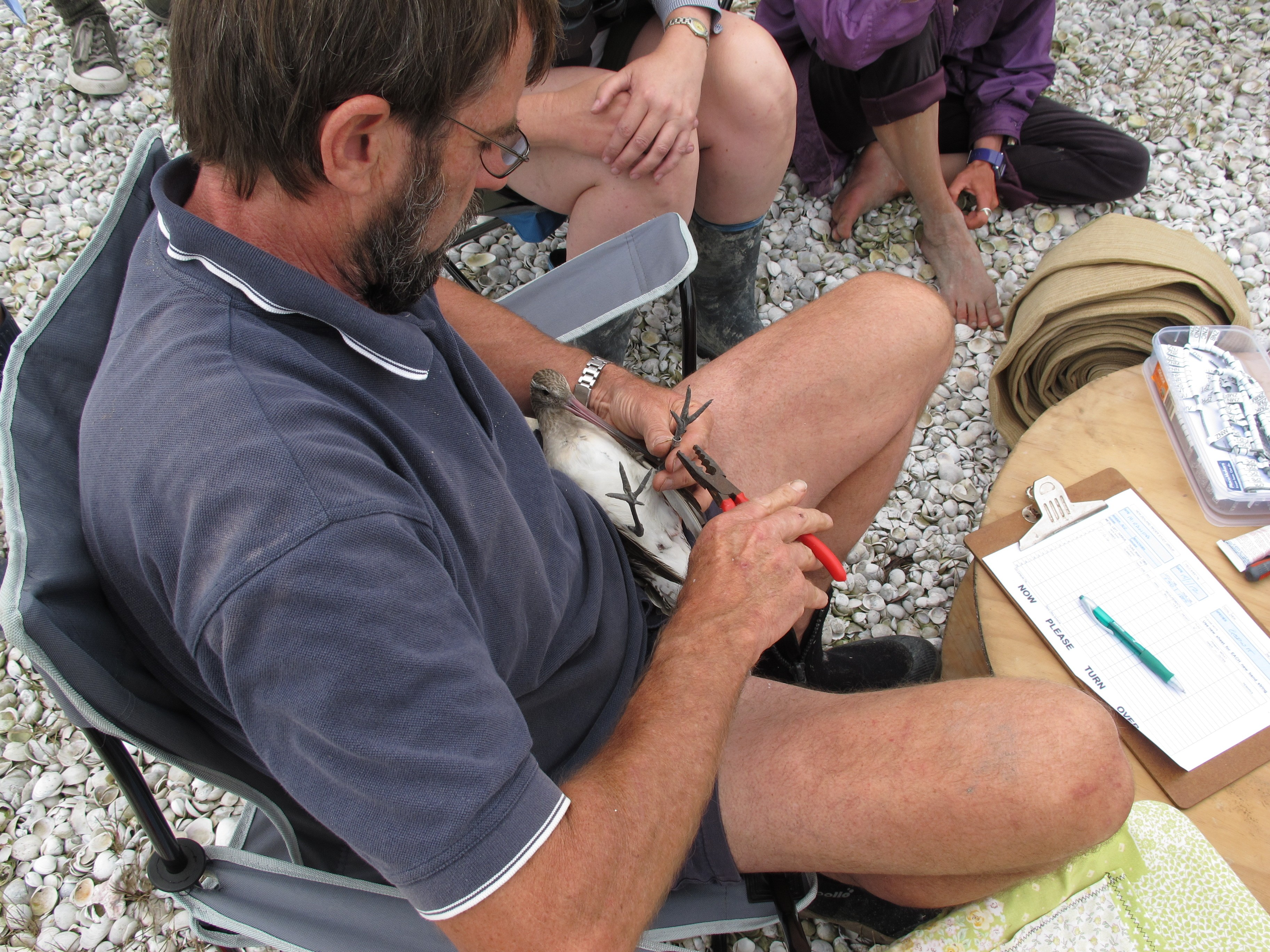
Adrian Riegen banding a bar-tailed godwit

In 1994 Adrian Riegen formed the New Zealand Wader Study Group, supported by the trust. The group consisted of bird banders, and had developed from a local Miranda group within the trust, to being a nationwide group recording and reporting on bird banding results to do with waders from all over New Zealand. A group of bird banders called "the Miranda Banders" had been active from 1979 to 1982, but was fired up again in late 1986, when four wrybills were caught by Adrian Riegen. The next catch in February 1987 consisted of more than 800 birds on the Kaipara Harbour. Catching was done with the use of a cannon net. Since then the catching and banding of birds have become and still are an important part of the work at the Shorebird Centre. Cannon netting is one of the highlights of the annual field courses. The banding and flagging of birds brought answers to many questions concerning the migration routes of godwits and knots. Results of the banding are published in The New Zealand Wader Study Group News, which is an occasional newsletter, published through the MNT.

In 1998 the site of the centre was enlarged with the selling of an extra 3,000 m^{2} of land, on which the manager's house stood.

=== Flyway liaison ===
A key objective of Miranda Naturalists' Trust being to promote the awareness of migratory shorebirds and their habitat requirements, involvement in activities along the East Asian – Australasian Flyway – often shortly called the "Flyway" – have become increasingly important. Any opportunity to foster links between countries and sites where shorebirds stay during their migratory movements over the year is taken. Especially the shorebird habitat in the Yellow Sea region gets much attention. These habitats are under severe pressures. In 2009 a delegation from Busan (South Korea) visited the centre and agreements were then made to facilitate links between schools in New Zealand and Korea. Commencing 25 February 2011 a group of 23 students, teachers and support staff from Korea visited the centre for 6 days as part of the International Shorebird Students Education Program (ISEP). In October 2010 Keith Woodley, manager of the Shorebird Centre, visited Mokpo, South Korea, to address a symposium on migratory shorebirds hosted by the Korea National Park Service and Sinan county.

The Miranda Naturalists' Trust has developed a "sister-site" relationship with the Yalu Jiang National Nature Reserve (YJNNR). This area houses large numbers of bar-tailed godwits during migration.

Also much attention is given to the area of Bohai Bay, China. The mudflats in this bay are a very important part of the "Flyway" of red knots and are rapidly destroyed to develop new land for the Caofeidian New Area Project.

=== Newsletter ===
Four times a year the trust publishes a newsletter to keep members in touch, and to bring news of events at the Miranda Shorebird Centre and along the East Asian-Australasian Flyway.

The first newsletters were mostly bird reports, annual reports and interim reports. In 1980 for the first time a real "Newsletter" was produced. It was only a single page and the bird reports were still published as well. September 1981 brought another newsletter, this time of four pages, and by June 1982 the newsletter had eleven pages, and had incorporated the annual and interim reports. The next newsletter in May 1983 looked much more professional, with text in two columns and photos, and stated that it was now "registered as a newspaper". From then on, newsletters and records (both in two column-print and with photos), alternately appeared, a newsletter in summer and the records in spring. From October 1984 the name of the editor, Stuart Chambers, was given. He actually became editor in 1983 and would remain until August 1996. The last "Records" showed up in November 1988. From then on the newsletter appeared bi-annually until 1990, when four newsletters were published. The newsletter of November 1990, published as "Newsletter 1", gives an account of the "Opening Ceremony" of the Shorebird Centre. From then on, 3 or 4 newsletters were published every year. No. 21, of May 1996 was the first newsletter with a cover in full colour. It had 44 pages and was called the "21st Birthday Issue". It was then called "Miranda Naturalists' Trust News" for the first time, the title it still holds.

== Birds ==
Worldwide 214 species of shorebirds are recognised. Of these, 41 have been recorded at Miranda. Birds that can be regularly seen at Miranda are:

- Wrybill (Anarhynchus frontalis): Wrybills are endemic to NZ. They breed on the South Island on the mid-Canterbury braided riverbeds. After breeding most birds fly to the North Island. In winter 2000 or 40% of the population of these plovers stay at Miranda.
- Banded dotterel (Charadrius bicinctus): Banded dotterels only breed in New Zealand. Strongholds of the species are on the South Island. Part of the population migrates to Australia, and another part migrates to the North Island. Of the New Zealand winter population of about 7,400, Miranda holds about 150 in winter.
- New Zealand dotterel (Charadrius obscurus): These plovers, that can only be found in New Zealand, breed at Miranda and can be found in small numbers most of the year.

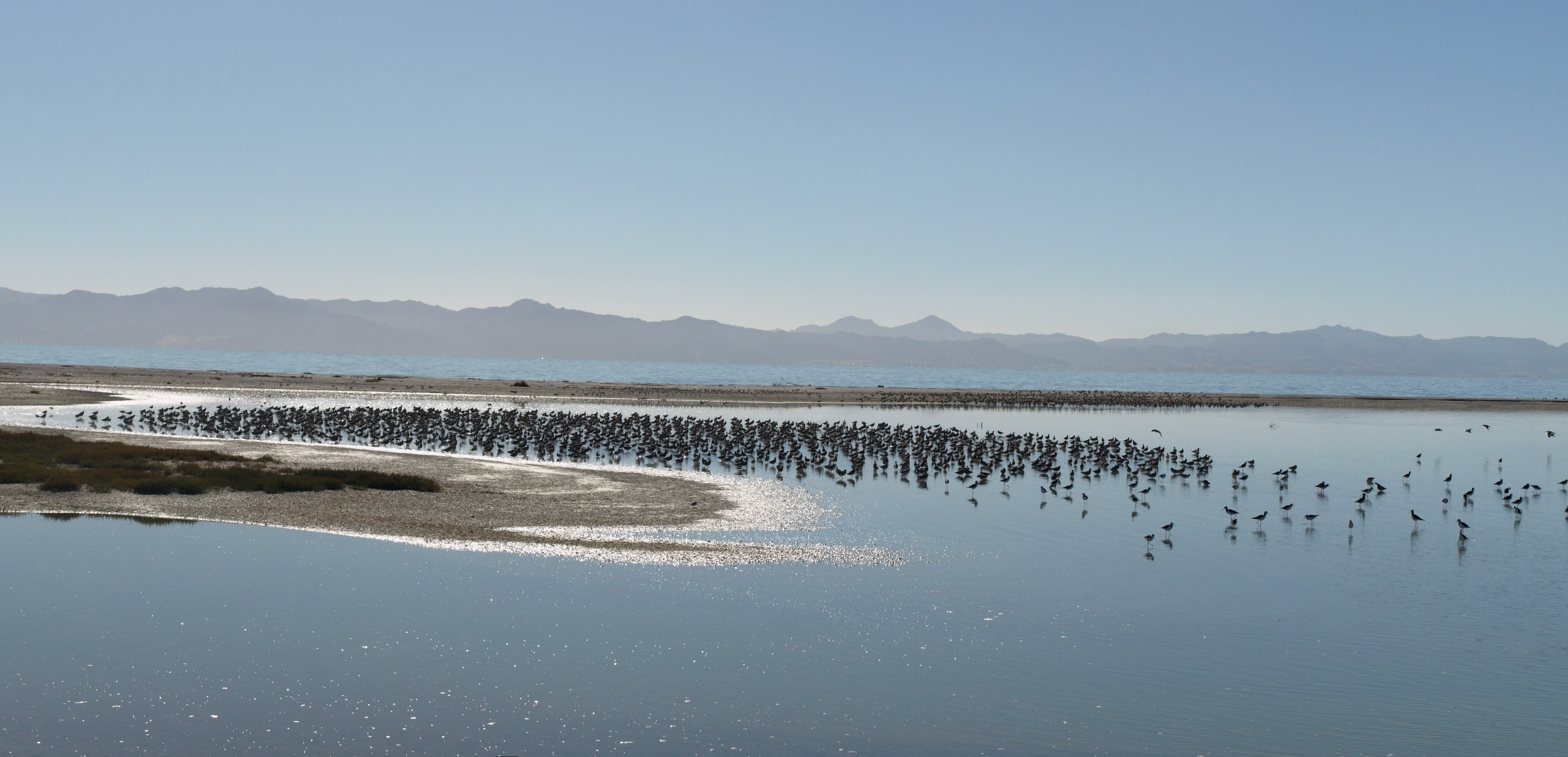
Bar-tailed godwits and pied stilts; seen from the old hide

- Bar-tailed godwit (Limosa lapponica): Only in the last years it has become clear that the godwits that migrate to New Zealand mainly come from Alaska. They belong to the subspecies baueri, that migrates to Australasia (especially New Zealand estuaries) In summer approximately 88,000 godwits stay in New Zealand, and 10,000 – 15,000 stay at Miranda. Research with small radio transmitters has shown that the birds follow a route via China when they migrate north, making the Yellow Sea a vital stepping stone. During their migration south, in September, the godwits often fly non-stop from Alaska to New Zealand. A lot of recent research concerning godwits is done at the Miranda Shorebird Centre. In 2009 a monography on godwits was published, written by Keith Woodley, manager of Miranda Shorebird Centre.
- South Island pied oystercatcher (Haematopus ostralegus): It breeds on the South Island, and migrates to estuaries of the North Island. Large flocks can be found at Miranda. The New Zealand winter population is thought to be 80,000. Of these 15,000 – 20,000 birds stay in the Firth of Thames in winter. They have the nickname "SIPO".
- Variable oystercatcher (Haematopus unicolor): This oystercatcher is another New Zealand bird that breeds at Miranda.
- Lesser knot or red knot (Calidris minutus): These arctic migrants flock together with the godwits on the high-water roosts between September and April. The New Zealand summer population is approximately 55,000, of which Miranda has 7,000 – 10,000 birds.
- Curlew sandpiper (Calidris ferruginea): This breeding bird of Siberia may be seen in small numbers in summer.
- Sharp-tailed sandpiper (Calidris acuminata): This is also a breeding bird in Siberia that visits Miranda in small numbers.
- Turnstone (Arenaria interpres): An arctic and subarctic breeding bird, visiting Miranda in small groups.
- Pied stilt (Himantopus himantopus): Of the New Zealand winter population of 18,000 birds, between 6,000 and 10,000 can be found at Miranda.
- Royal spoonbill (Platalea regia)
- Caspian tern (Sterna caspia)

Knots arrive in New Zealand in early September, followed by godwits in about the third week of September. The biggest influx occurs during October and November. Godwits and knots depart usually between mid-March and early-April. Knot numbers at Miranda gradually decline until only an over-wintering flock of about 500 birds remains.

=== Wader censuses ===
Since 1960 wader censuses at Miranda take place twice a year, in November and June. The breeding areas of the migratory birds often have a dispersed nature. The only opportunity for any form of population monitoring is during the non-breeding season when the birds congregate in places like the tidal regions of the Firth of Thames. Counting of the shorebirds at the high tide roosts over longer periods of time can give a good indication of the population trends. The figures can be used when discussing the conservation of wetlands along the migratory routes. The datasets collected at Miranda is one of the longest available. In 1983 the Ornithological Society of New Zealand (OSNZ) initiated a national wader count scheme. This scheme was continued until 1994 and then reinstated for the period from 2004 to 2009.

== Pūkorokoro area name and Trust name ==
In 2012, Ngāti Pāoa made the Miranda Naturalists' Trust aware of their longstanding grievance that the historic name of the area—Pūkorokoro—was lost during the Invasion of the Waikato. The Trust responded favourably to a dual-name proposal but said that due to their international profile being tied to the name Miranda, they could not drop "Miranda" from their name yet. The Miranda Naturalists' Trust consulted its membership about their proposed name change in August 2013 and at the subsequent annual general meeting in May 2014, a unanimous decision was passed by the 50 members present in support of the name change to Pūkorokoro Miranda Naturalists' Trust.

The Centre has since dropped 'Miranda' and is now known as Pūkorokoro Shorebird Centre.

== Pūkorokoro Shorebird Centre ==
The Pūkorokoro Shorebird Centre can be found on the west side of the road between Miranda and Kaiaua. It's open to visitors all year, and it has information displays on wader birds of the Firth of Thames. It also houses a shop, which offers a collection of books on birds and birding and bird related souvenirs.

The centre has a library, that is open to use for research purposes.

The centre offers low budget accommodation in the forms of bunkrooms and self-contained units for individuals and (small) groups.

Keith Woodley is the centre manager since 1 May 1993.

Visitor numbers have developed from 3,000 in 1993 to 16,000 in 2008.

=== Bird hide ===
A hide for observing the birds stands 2 km south of the centre. It overlooks the shellbanks where large numbers of godwits, knots and other shorebirds roost at high tide. During a large part of the season a guide of the Shorebird Centre is stationed at the hide around high tide. The guide assists visitors who want to learn to know the birds. Binoculars, and a telescope are available, so that visitors can have a close look at the birds. Volunteers had been guiding in the past, but since 2009 this is done by the Shorebird Centre assistant. Between October 2010 and April 2011 during 85 days the number of visitors during approximately 3 hours over the high tide were counted. These numbers counted up to 2150. In December 2011 a new bird hide was built several hundred metres south of the existing hide.

=== Field courses ===
Since 1999 each year a field course is held. These courses take a week. The 10 – 12 students, in an age span of 14 to 83, get an introduction on binoculars and telescopes, on wader watching and identification, on the ecology of the Upper Firth of Thames, on feeding behaviour of shorebirds, on conservation of wader habitat, on invertebrates and plant life of the Miranda area, on netting and banding, and so on. The courses are given by about 9 tutors and are held at the Shorebird Centre.

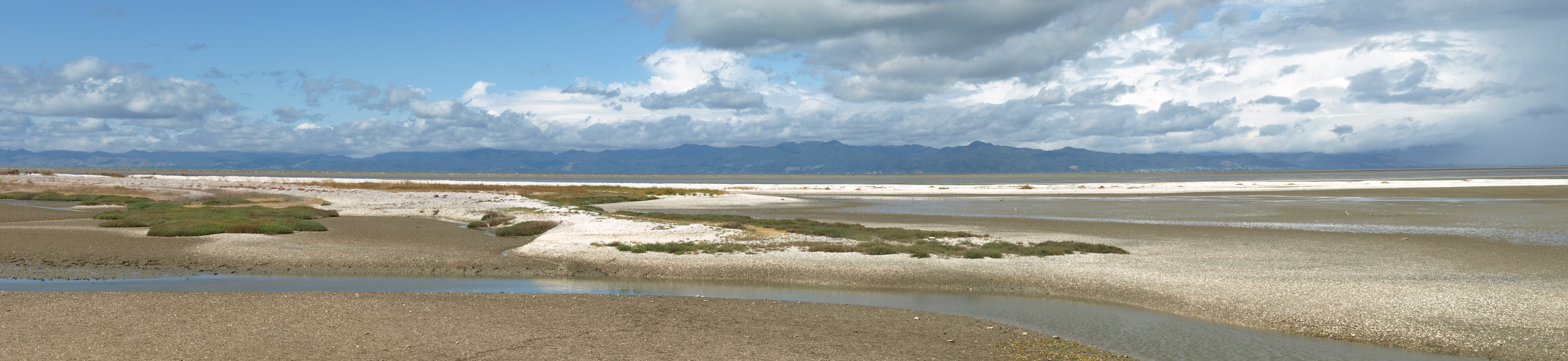
A view from the hide of the Miranda Shorebird Centre
