= Beach ridge =

Wave-swept or wave-deposited ridge running parallel to a shoreline

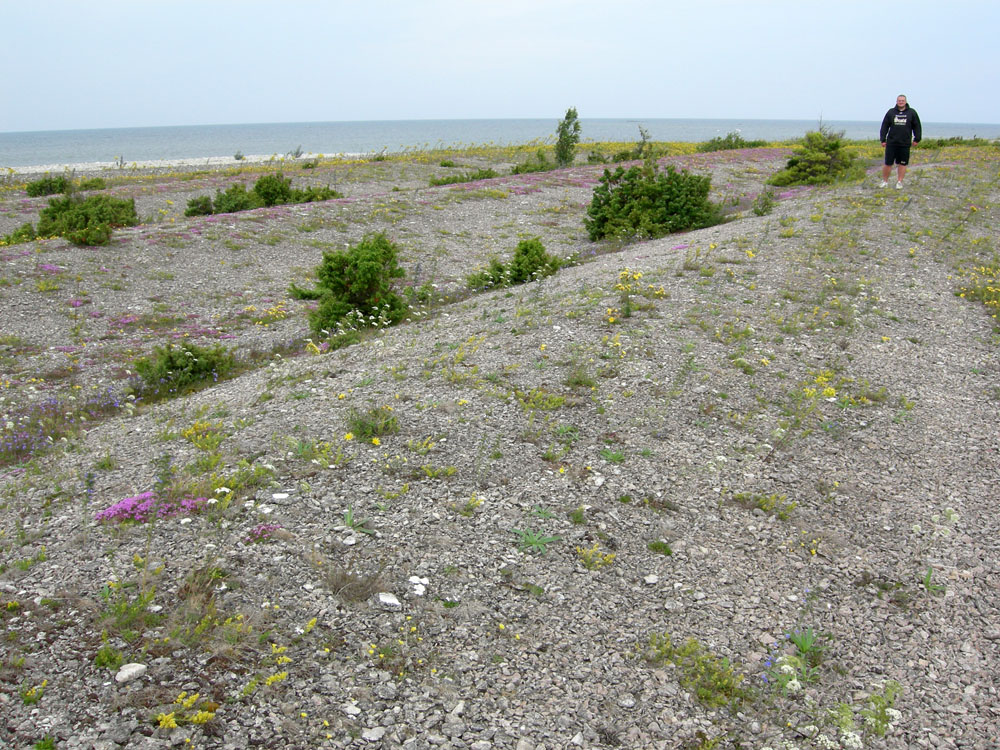
Beach ridges on the north coast of Saaremaa, Estonia.

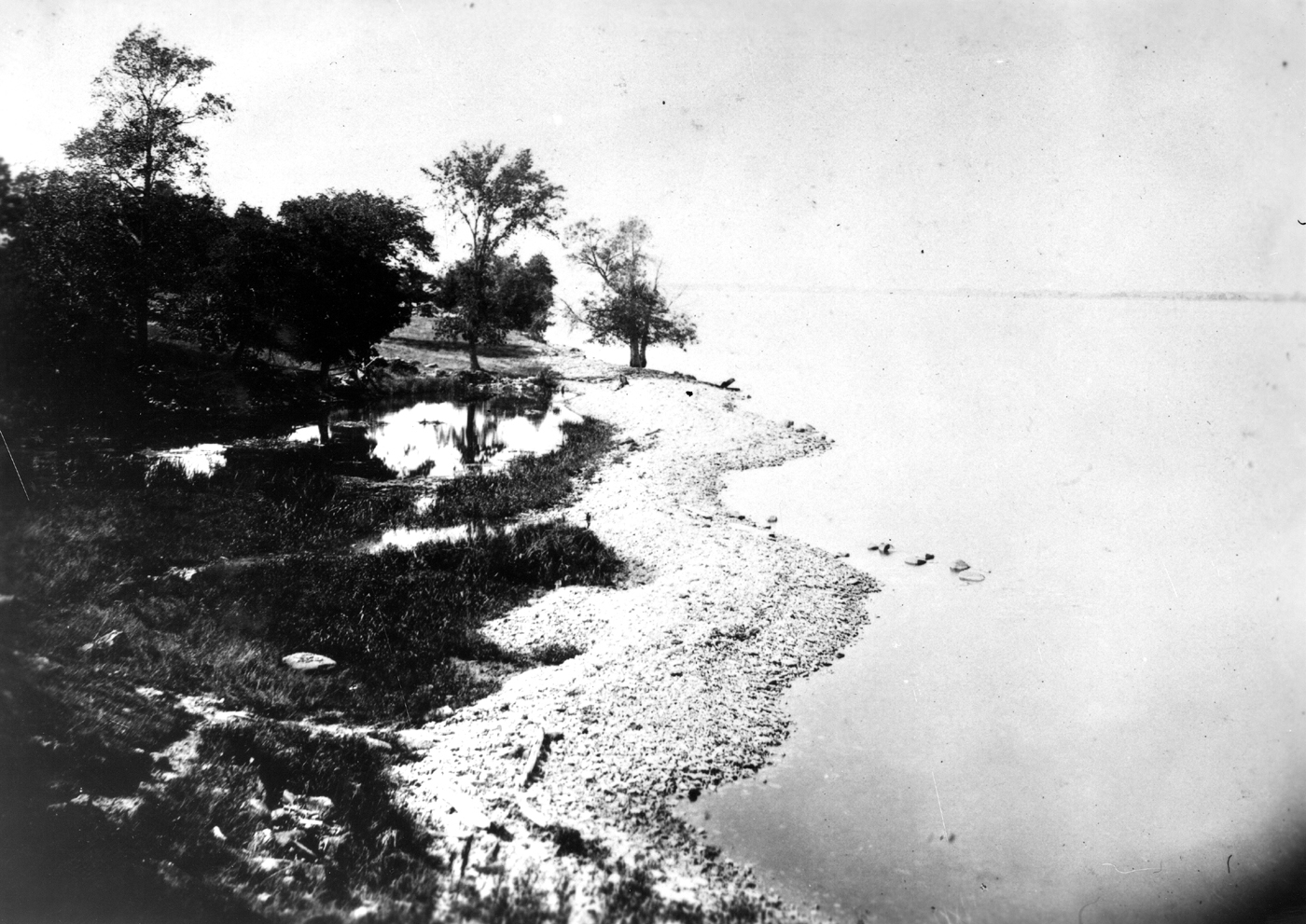
Beach ridge, Lake Ontario, New York, 1895.

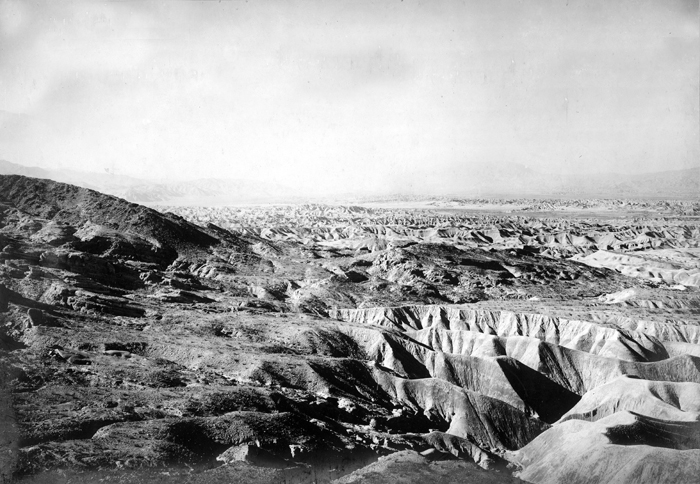
Miocene beach ridges, San Diego County, California, 1905.

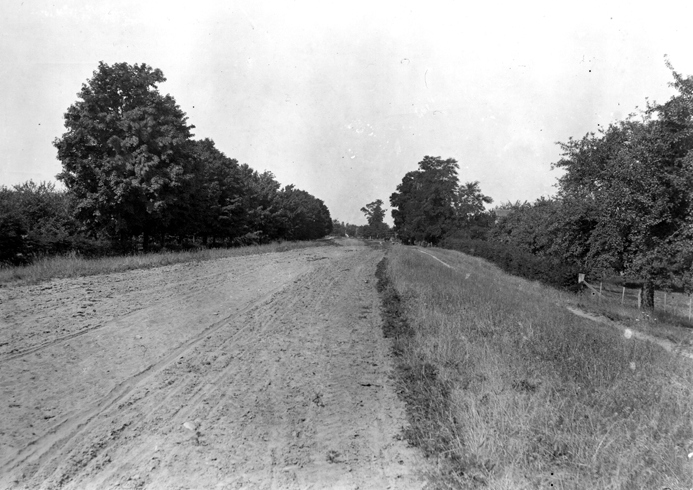
Road built on crest of Glacial Lake Iroquois beach ridge, Orleans County, New York, 1889.

A beach ridge is a wave-swept or wave-deposited ridge running parallel to a shoreline. It is commonly composed of sand as well as sediment worked from underlying beach material. The movement of sediment by wave action is called littoral transport. Movement of material parallel to the shoreline is called longshore transport. Movement perpendicular to the shore is called on-offshore transport. A beach ridge may be capped by, or associated with, sand dunes. The height of a beach ridge is affected by wave size and energy.

A fall in water level (or an uplift of land) can isolate a beach ridge from the body of water that created it. Isolated beach ridges may be found along dry lakes in the western United States and inland of the Great Lakes of North America, where they formed at the end of the last ice age when lake levels were much higher due to glacial melting and obstructed outflow caused by glacial ice. Some isolated beach ridges are found in parts of Scandinavia, where glacial melting relieved pressure on land masses and resulted in subsequent crustal lifting or post-glacial rebound. A rise in water level can submerge beach ridges created at an earlier stage, causing them to erode and become less distinct.

Beach ridges can become routes for roads and trails, like in the case of the west coast in the Netherlands, where isolated beach ridges were formed early on in the Holocene, during the Atlanticum, behind newly formed dunes. The old and the new beach ridges are the only dry routes amidst wet peatland. Numerous settlements emerged here, some of them developed in large populous centers, like The Hague, Haarlem and Alkmaar.

== See also ==
- Berm (landform)
- Beach
- Chenier
- Isostasy
- Machair
- Marine terrace
- Strand plain

== Sources ==
- "Water Resource Availability in the Maumee River Basin, Indiana" (PDF). Water Resource Assessment 96–5. Indianapolis: Indiana Department of Natural Resources, Division of Water: 191. 1996. Archived from the original (PDF) on September 24, 2007.
- Forsyth, Jane L. (1959). The Beach Ridges of Northern Ohio (PDF). Columbus: Ohio Division of Geological Survey Information Circular 25. (out of print).
- "Great Lakes Information Network: Great Lakes Shoreline Geology". Archived from the original on March 4, 2006.
