= Stuart Chambers (ornithologist) =

New Zealand ornithologist (born 1937)

Stuart Chambers (born 14 September 1937 in Auckland) is a New Zealand ornithologist. He has been associated with ornithologists Charles Fleming, A. H. Hooper, Ross McKenzie and R.B. Sibson. He is the author of Birds Of New Zealand – Locality Guide and New Zealand Birds – An Identification Guide. He has been involved with the Miranda Naturalists' Trust as well as the development of the Miranda Shorebird Centre, the Aroha Island Ecological Centre, and is a proponent of the development of birdwatching in New Zealand. Chambers is the owner and manager of the small New Zealand-based publishing company Arun Books.

Books authored and published:

Bird books

- Birds of New Zealand: Locality Guide – 2000
- Birds of New Zealand – The Colour Guide to Bird Identification – 2016
- Birds of New Zealand – Locality Guide – Bird Places – 2011
- Birds of New Zealand – locality guide – a birder's companion – 2012

Novels

- Waiparu – 2009
- Season of the sheep – 2009
- Under the Fiji sun – 2009
- The Reluctant Gardener – 2010
- Hamna Kabisa – The Tanzanian Joke – 2012
- The Par-Rem Kids – 2012
- Pidgeon Place – 2023

Other

- The Farmers Way – 2015
- The Way of the Farmer – 1977
