= Chenier =

Beach ridge in strand plain coastal topography

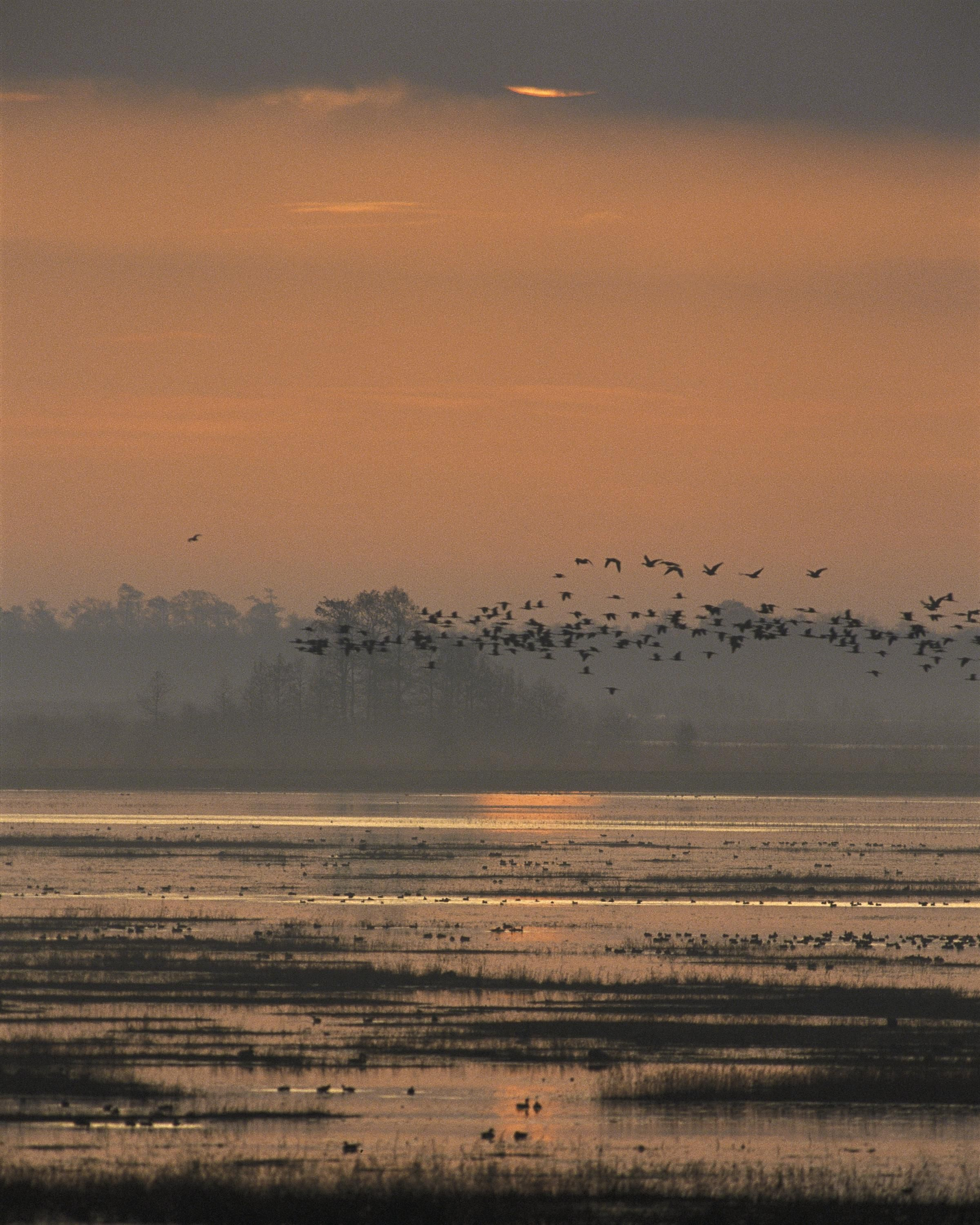
Marsh and ridge in Lacassine National Wildlife Refuge, Louisiana

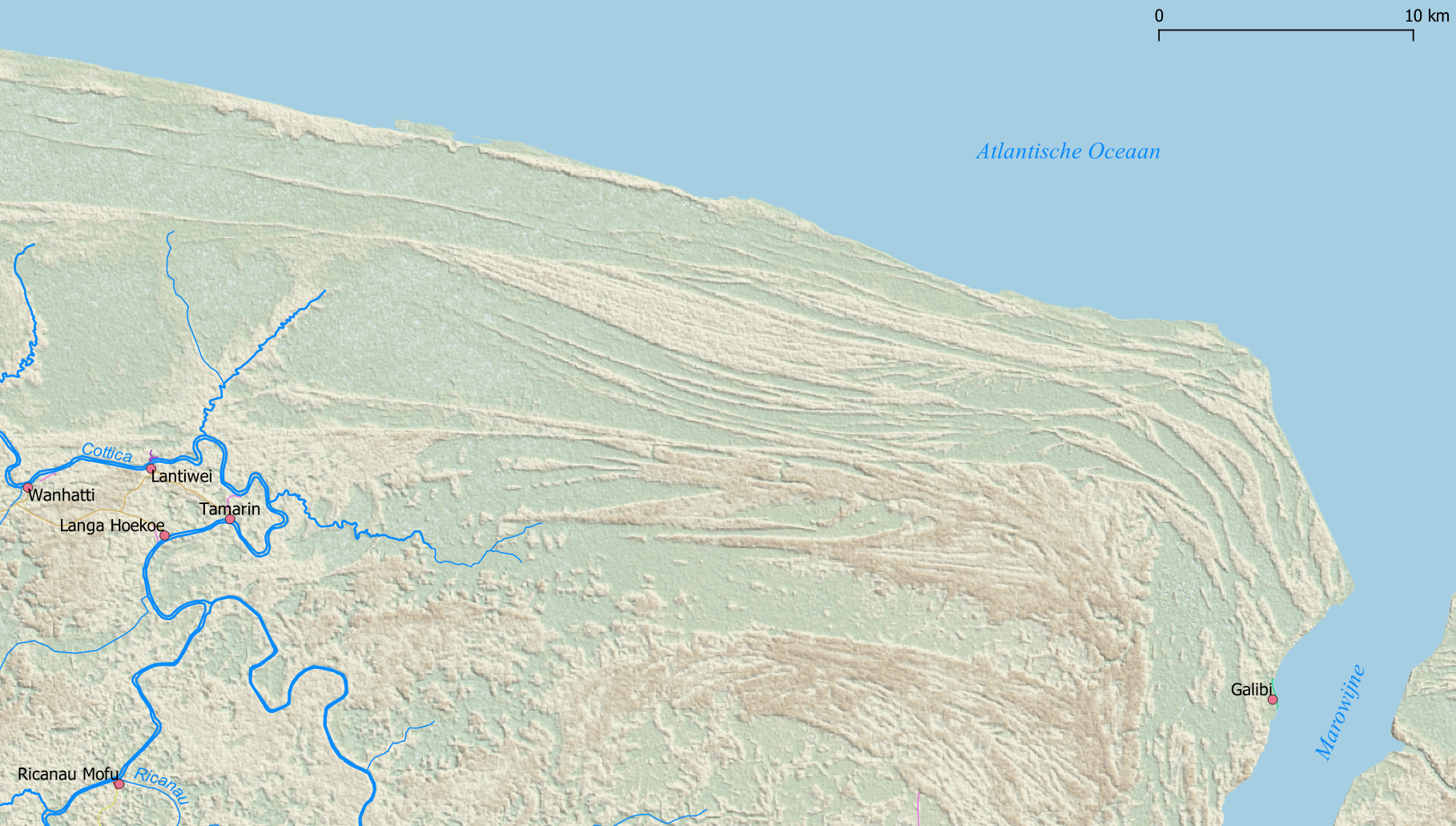
Chenier plain in NE Suriname

A chenier or chénier is a sandy or shelly beach ridge that is part of a strand plain, called a “chenier plain,” consisting of cheniers separated by intervening mud-flat deposits with marsh and swamp vegetation. Cheniers are typically one to six meters high, tens of kilometers long, hundreds of meters wide, and often wooded. Chenier plains can be tens of kilometers wide. Cheniers and associated chenier plains are associated with shorelines characterized by generally low wave energy, low gradient, muddy shorelines, and abundant sediment supply. The name is derived from the Louisiana French word for these formations, “chênière", meaning oak-grove, referring to the forests of live oaks Quercus virginiana that occupy the chenier ridges within southwest Louisiana.

== Colorado River Delta ==
Cheniers made primarily of shells of the Colorado Delta clam are found in the tidal flats of the Colorado River Delta in northeastern Baja California, Mexico.

== Louisiana ==
The Louisiana Chenier Plain, extending roughly from Sabine Lake to Vermilion Bay along the Gulf Coast, serves critical ecosystem functions, particularly as a wildlife habitat and stopover for migrating birds. As the region was settled, the cheniers were developed preferentially, owing to protection from flooding afforded by the higher elevation. Examples of communities situated on such ridges in the Chenier Plain include Grand Chenier in Cameron Parish, Pecan Island in Vermilion Parish and the former settlement of Cheniere Caminada adjacent to Grand Isle, south of New Orleans. The ridges, however, offer insufficient protection from storm surges, thus Cheniere Caminada was completely destroyed by a hurricane in 1893, and Pecan Island and Grand Chenier have been devastated by several powerful storms, including Hurricane Audrey, Hurricane Rita, Hurricane Ike, Hurricane Laura and Hurricane Delta.

Kirby explains how sediment deposition through the null point hypothesis leads to the creation of chenier. Sediment fines are suspended and reworked aerially offshore, leaving behind lag deposits of mainly bivalve and gastropod shells separated out from the finer substrate beneath. Waves and currents then heap these deposits to form chenier ridges throughout the tidal zone. They tend to force the deposits up the foreshore profile, but also along the foreshore.

== Miranda, New Zealand ==
The chenier plain in Miranda in the Firth of Thames is one of the most significant Holocene coastal strand plains in the world and an important stopover point in the godwit flight path.

== Essex, England ==
In Essex, ground-truthing data demonstrate that the radar profiles accurately delineate the subsurface stratigraphy and sedimentary structure of the cheniers. Interpretation of the radar stratigraphy taken from the radar reflection profiles allows various deposits to be identified. These have resulted from overwashing, overtopping, sedimentation across the whole of a seaward dipping beachface or berm ridge welding onto the upper beachface. Each chenier is characterised by a different spatial arrangement of these four basic depositional units.

== Coastal plain of French Guiana, Suriname and Guyana ==
An extensive complex of beach ridges and swamps (ritsen en zwampen in Suriname) was formed between the mouth of the Amazon River and the Orinoco on the coastal plain of the Guiana Shield.

== See also ==
- Deposition (geology)
