= Seabird Coast =

Coordinates: 37°10′0.15″S 175°18′43.4″E

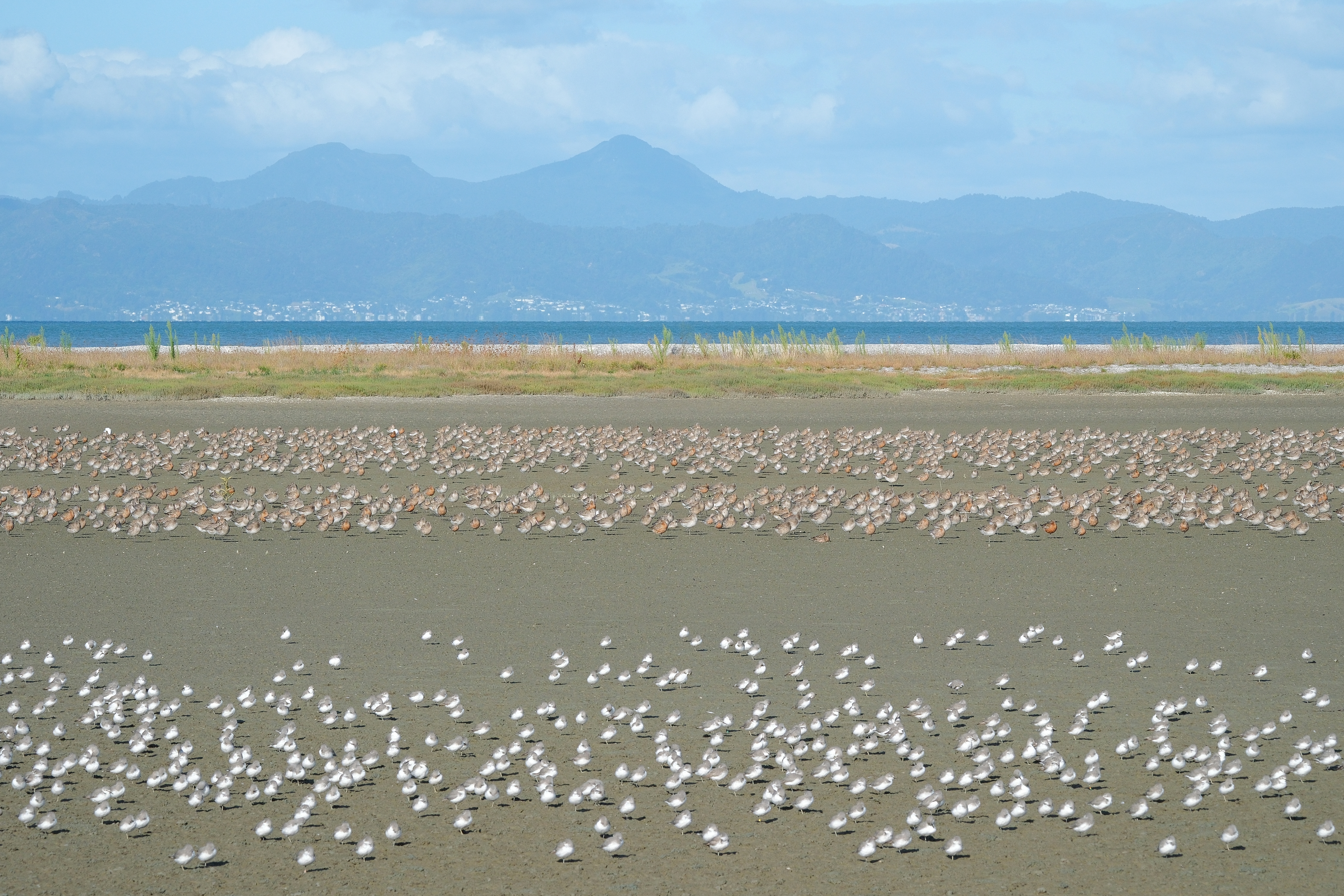

The Seabird Coast, also known as the Wharekawa Coast, is a beach area situated on the Firth of Thames in the North Island of New Zealand, lies about three kilometres from the small town of Miranda. It is the location of the Miranda Shorebird Centre and is well known for its godwits. On 18 November 1769, James Cook landed on the Seabird Coast as a part of the first voyage, as HMS Endeavour circumnavigated New Zealand.

Godwits migrate in huge flocks to and fro between New Zealand and Alaska. Some of the weaker ones give up and stop at Australia or China. The most famous godwit, known as E7, has flown all the way from Alaska to New Zealand non-stop. Most other birds stop at China on the way.

Many bird-spotting posts are placed around the beach for bird watching, and a bird sanctuary located nearby provides for injured birds. The New Zealand government purposely limits the local population for the sake of the godwits.
