= Pūkorokoro / Miranda =

- Interactive map of Pūkorokoro / Miranda
- Coordinates: 37°11′08″S 175°18′52″E
- Country: New Zealand
- Region: Waikato region
- District: Hauraki District
- Ward: Plains Ward
- Electorates: Coromandel; Hauraki-Waikato (Māori)

Government
  - Territorial authority: Hauraki District Council
  - Regional council: Waikato Regional Council
  - Mayor of Hauraki: Toby Adams
  - Coromandel MP: Scott Simpson
  - Hauraki-Waikato MP: Hana-Rawhiti Maipi-Clarke

Area
  - Total: 18.09 km^{2} (6.98 sq mi)

Population (2023)
  - Total: 135
  - Density: 7.46/km^{2} (19.3/sq mi)

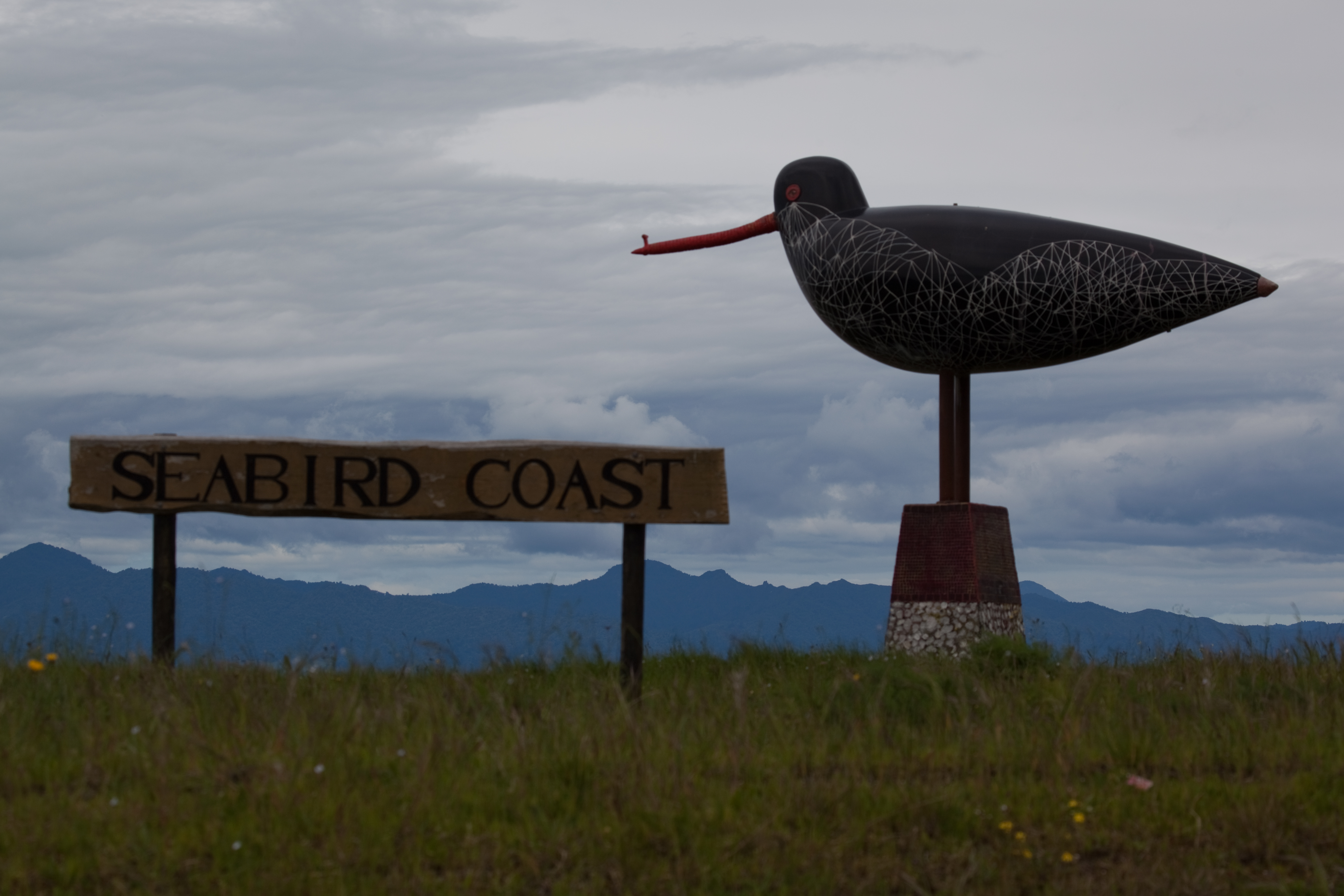
Giant sculpture of an oystercatcher

Pūkorokoro / Miranda (until 2015 known as Miranda) is a historical fort and small village in the Firth of Thames, New Zealand. The locality is mostly known for the Pūkorokoro Shorebird Centre run by the Pūkorokoro Miranda Naturalists' Trust, a charitable trust to encourage people to visit the coastline and appreciate its wide range of flora and fauna.

== Attractions ==
It is best known as the location of the Pūkorokoro Shorebird Centre, owned and operated by the Pūkorokoro Miranda Naturalists' Trust. The Robert Findlay Wildlife Reserve, 2km south, is the main public reserve where visitors can walk through a saltmarsh landscape on a rare chenier plain geology, and view many different migratory and resident bird species around high tide. The Miranda Hot Springs were another attraction for visitors but have been closed since approximately 2018.

The nearby Makomako Marae is a traditional meeting ground for Ngāti Pāoa, and features the Rangimarie meeting house.

== History ==
The Ngāti Pāoa village of Pūkorokoro was renamed after the warship HMS Miranda, which brought 300 soldiers of the 70th Surrey Regiment to the area in 1863, together with 600 more men on other ships. Although the local iwi, Ngāti Pāoa, was loyal to the Crown, their settlement Pūkorokoro was shelled by the Miranda, killing many of the villagers. The soldiers were to build a fort supporting the British troops fighting in the Waikato region during the New Zealand Wars. Several redoubts were eventually built, one of them named after the ship leading the small troop flotilla. A local headland also carries the name, together ensuring that the name became fixed.

== Name ==
In 2012, the local iwi, Ngāti Pāoa, made the Miranda Naturalists' Trust aware of their longstanding grievance that the historic name of the area—Pūkorokoro—was lost during the Invasion of the Waikato. The Trust responded favourably to a dual-name proposal but said that due to their international profile being tied to the name Miranda, they could not drop "Miranda" from their name yet. The Miranda Naturalists' Trust consulted its membership about their proposed name change in August 2013 and at the subsequent annual general meeting in May 2014, a unanimous decision was passed by the 50 members present in support of the name change to Pūkorokoro Miranda Naturalists' Trust.

Ngāti Pāoa then proposed, through the Office of Treaty Settlements, that a dual name of Pūkorokoro / Miranda be assigned to the area. Also proposed were to rename the nearby Miranda Hot Springs, and the locality adjacent to the hot springs of the same name. The New Zealand Geographic Board added to the proposal that the local hill Pukorokoro be renamed to receive a macron and that the same would happen to Pukorokoro Stream.

The hill and stream's altered names (a macron was added as proposed) were gazetted on 26 February 2015 and the other name changes were gazetted on 13 August 2015 as follows:

- the hot spring was assigned the dual name Pūkorokoro / Miranda Hot Springs
- the locality adjacent to the hot spring was assigned the dual name Pūkorokoro / Miranda Hot Springs
- the populated place "Miranda" was changed to Pūkorokoro / Miranda

== Demographics ==
Pūkorokoro / Miranda settlement is in an SA1 statistical area which covers 18.09 km^{2} (6.98 sq mi). The SA1 area is part of the larger Miranda-Pūkorokoro statistical area.

Historical population for the settlement and surrounds
| Year | Pop. | ±% p.a. |
|---|---|---|
| 2006 | 108 | — |
| 2013 | 120 | +1.52% |
| 2018 | 120 | +0.00% |
| 2023 | 135 | +2.38% |

The SA1 area had a population of 135 in the 2023 New Zealand census, an increase of 15 people (12.5%) since the 2018 census, and an increase of 15 people (12.5%) since the 2013 census. There were 75 males and 60 females in 51 dwellings. The median age was 47.0 years (compared with 38.1 years nationally). There were 24 people (17.8%) aged under 15 years, 12 (8.9%) aged 15 to 29, 66 (48.9%) aged 30 to 64, and 33 (24.4%) aged 65 or older.

People could identify as more than one ethnicity. The results were 86.7% European (Pākehā), 20.0% Māori, 6.7% Pasifika, and 2.2% Asian. English was spoken by 95.6%, Māori language by 2.2%, and other languages by 4.4%. No language could be spoken by 4.4% (e.g. too young to talk). The percentage of people born overseas was 8.9, compared with 28.8% nationally.

Religious affiliations were 24.4% Christian, 2.2% Māori religious beliefs, and 2.2% Buddhist. People who answered that they had no religion were 64.4%, and 8.9% of people did not answer the census question.

Of those at least 15 years old, 27 (24.3%) people had a bachelor's or higher degree, 54 (48.6%) had a post-high school certificate or diploma, and 30 (27.0%) people exclusively held high school qualifications. The median income was $45,300, compared with $41,500 nationally. 15 people (13.5%) earned over $100,000 compared to 12.1% nationally. The employment status of those at least 15 was that 78 (70.3%) people were employed full-time and 15 (13.5%) were part-time.

=== Miranda-Pūkorokoro statistical area ===
Miranda-Pūkorokoro statistical area, which includes Kaiaua and Whakatīwai, covers 81.34 km^{2} (31.41 sq mi) and had an estimated population of 990 as of June 2025, with a population density of 12 people per km^{2}.

Historical population for Miranda-Pūkorokoro statistical area
| Year | Pop. | ±% p.a. |
|---|---|---|
| 2006 | 663 | — |
| 2013 | 786 | +2.46% |
| 2018 | 849 | +1.55% |
| 2023 | 963 | +2.55% |

Miranda-Pūkorokoro had a population of 963 in the 2023 New Zealand census, an increase of 114 people (13.4%) since the 2018 census, and an increase of 177 people (22.5%) since the 2013 census. There were 498 males, 462 females and 6 people of other genders in 417 dwellings. 0.9% of people identified as LGBTIQ+. The median age was 54.5 years (compared with 38.1 years nationally). There were 132 people (13.7%) aged under 15 years, 111 (11.5%) aged 15 to 29, 426 (44.2%) aged 30 to 64, and 294 (30.5%) aged 65 or older.

People could identify as more than one ethnicity. The results were 83.2% European (Pākehā), 29.9% Māori, 5.0% Pasifika, 1.9% Asian, and 4.0% other, which includes people giving their ethnicity as "New Zealander". English was spoken by 98.1%, Māori language by 4.7%, and other languages by 4.0%. No language could be spoken by 1.6% (e.g. too young to talk). New Zealand Sign Language was known by 0.3%. The percentage of people born overseas was 10.3, compared with 28.8% nationally.

Religious affiliations were 29.0% Christian, 0.6% Māori religious beliefs, 0.3% Buddhist, 0.3% New Age, and 0.6% other religions. People who answered that they had no religion were 58.6%, and 10.6% of people did not answer the census question.

Of those at least 15 years old, 123 (14.8%) people had a bachelor's or higher degree, 459 (55.2%) had a post-high school certificate or diploma, and 246 (29.6%) people exclusively held high school qualifications. The median income was $32,900, compared with $41,500 nationally. 66 people (7.9%) earned over $100,000 compared to 12.1% nationally. The employment status of those at least 15 was that 375 (45.1%) people were employed full-time, 138 (16.6%) were part-time, and 18 (2.2%) were unemployed.
