= Firth of Thames =

Bay in New Zealand

Coordinates: 37°00′S 175°25′E

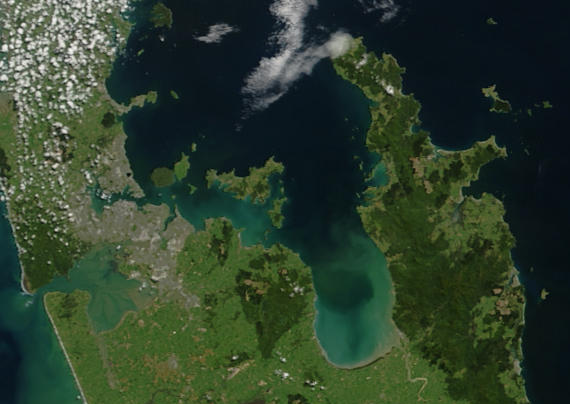
- An image showing the Hauraki Gulf. The Firth of Thames is the large bay to the southeast.
- Interactive map of Firth of Thames
- Location: North Island of New Zealand
- Area: 8,927 hectares (22,060 acres)

Ramsar Wetland
- Designated: 29 January 1990
- Reference no.: 459

The Firth of Thames (Māori: Tikapa Moana-o-Hauraki) is a large bay located in the north of the North Island of New Zealand. It is the firth of the rivers Waihou and Piako, the former of which was formerly named the Thames River, and the town of Thames lies on its southeastern coast.

Its Maori name is Tikapa. In traditional legend, the firth and the greater Hauraki Gulf are protected by a taniwha named Ureia, who takes the form of a whale.

The firth lies at the southern end of the Hauraki Gulf, southeast of the city of Auckland. It occupies a rift valley or graben between the Coromandel Peninsula and Hunua Ranges, which continues into the Hauraki Plains to the south.

== Conservation ==
The Firth of Thames is an important site for waders or shorebirds, and is listed as a wetland of international importance under the Ramsar Convention. The Miranda Shorebird Centre, operated by the Miranda Naturalists' Trust, is located on the Seabird Coast, on the western shore of the bay at Miranda.

However, the firth overall is severely damaged by man-made influences, especially dairy-farm run-off, and has not recovered from large-scale mussel dredging over 40 years after the practice ceased (more information in the Hauraki Gulf article).

Whales such as southern right whales (one of two of the first confirmed birth records in main islands waters since the end of commercial and illegal whaling was observed in Browns Bay region in 2012) and Bryde's whales can be seen in the bay to calve and rest.

== Climate ==
Climate data for Firth Of Thames (1991–2020)
Month	Jan	Feb	Mar	Apr	May	Jun	Jul	Aug	Sep	Oct	Nov	Dec	Year
Mean daily maximum °C (°F)	25.0 (77.0)	25.5 (77.9)	23.8 (74.8)	21.2 (70.2)	18.0 (64.4)	15.3 (59.5)	14.6 (58.3)	15.5 (59.9)	17.1 (62.8)	18.7 (65.7)	20.6 (69.1)	22.9 (73.2)	19.8 (67.7)
Daily mean °C (°F)	18.9 (66.0)	19.4 (66.9)	17.6 (63.7)	15.2 (59.4)	12.6 (54.7)	10.3 (50.5)	9.6 (49.3)	10.5 (50.9)	12.2 (54.0)	13.6 (56.5)	15.2 (59.4)	17.5 (63.5)	14.4 (57.9)
Mean daily minimum °C (°F)	12.9 (55.2)	13.3 (55.9)	11.3 (52.3)	9.3 (48.7)	7.1 (44.8)	5.3 (41.5)	4.5 (40.1)	5.5 (41.9)	7.2 (45.0)	8.4 (47.1)	9.7 (49.5)	12.1 (53.8)	8.9 (48.0)
Average rainfall mm (inches)	82.5 (3.25)	69.9 (2.75)	97.7 (3.85)	123.1 (4.85)	99.3 (3.91)	105.3 (4.15)	112.1 (4.41)	125.0 (4.92)	99.8 (3.93)	72.1 (2.84)	64.8 (2.55)	66.8 (2.63)	1,118.4 (44.04)
Source: NIWA
