= Itoi =

Itoi (糸井) may refer to:

People

- Shigesato Itoi, Japanese author and game designer
- Yoshio Itoi, Japanese professional baseball player
- Hajime Itoi, Japanese backstroke swimmer

Places

- Itoi Station, a railway station on the Muroran Main Line in Tomakomai, Hokkaidō, Japan
- Izushi-Itoi Prefectural Natural Park, is a Prefectural Natural Park in northeast Hyōgo Prefecture, Japan
- Itoi (Hitui), a village in India

== See also ==
- I'itoi, the cosmology of the O'odham peoples
