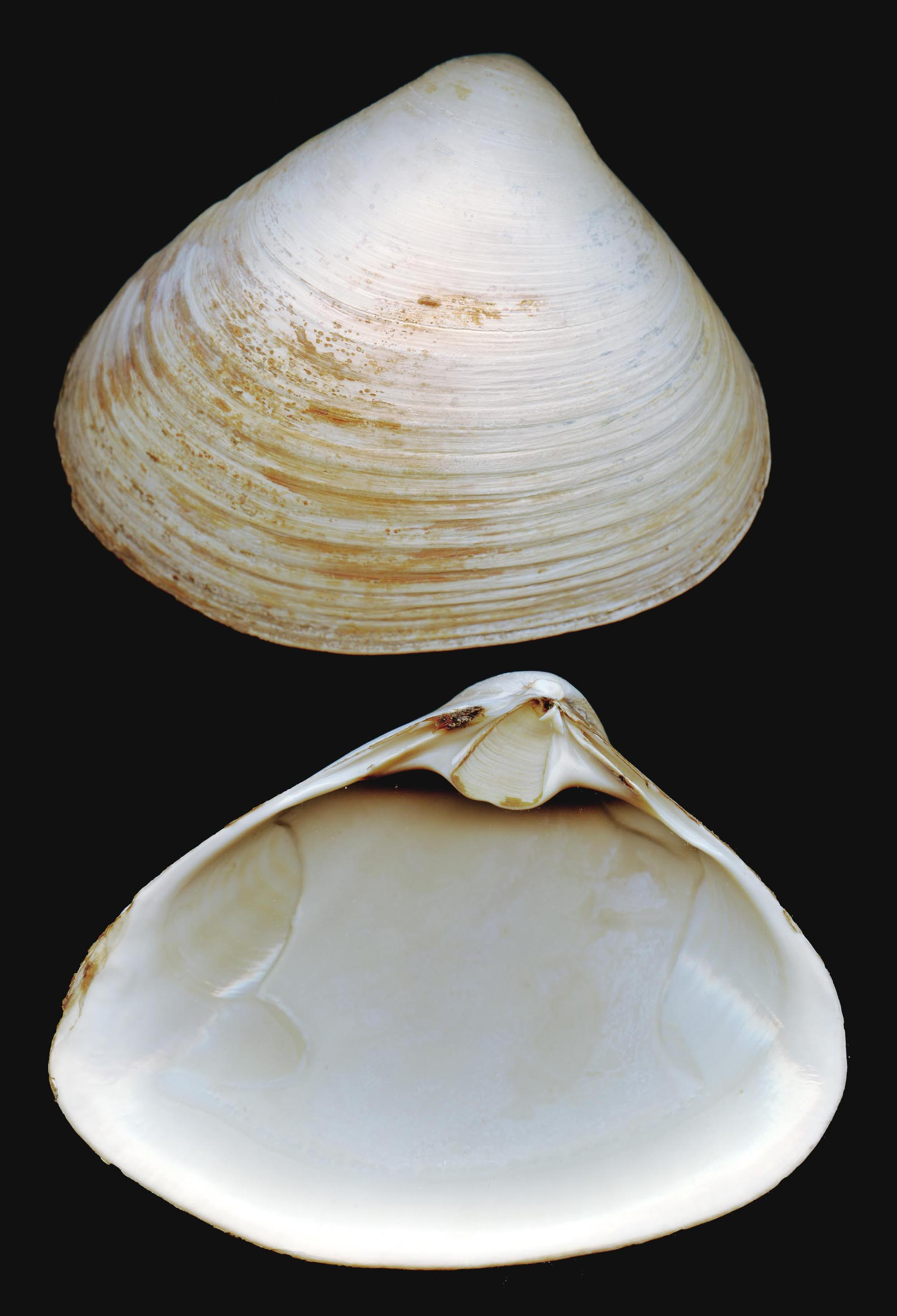
- A 15 cm adult shell of Spisula solidissima from Long Beach, Long Island. Right valve at the top, left valve at the bottom.

Conservation status
- Secure (NatureServe)

Scientific classification
- Kingdom: Animalia
- Phylum: Mollusca
- Class: Bivalvia
- Order: Venerida
- Family: Mactridae
- Subfamily: Mactrinae
- Genus: Spisula
- Species: S. solidissima

Binomial name
- Spisula solidissima (Dillwyn, 1817)

= Atlantic surf clam =

Species of mollusk

The Atlantic surf clam (Spisula solidissima), also called the bar clam, hen clam, skimmer or simply sea clam, is a very large, edible, saltwater clam or marine bivalve mollusk in the family Mactridae. It is one of the most commonly found species of bivalves in the western Atlantic Ocean. Able to reach sizes between 7.9 and 8.9 inches (20 and 23 cm) in length, Atlantic surf clams are much larger than Spisula solida, which also resides in the eastern Atlantic coastal waters. Atlantic surf clams reproduce in late summer, when the water temperatures peak.

The shell of this species is a well-known object to beach-goers in the northeastern United States. People on the beach often pick up a large empty shell of this species, either to dig in the sand with, or take home to use as a decorative dish or ashtray.

The species is exported commercially as a food item.

Right and left valve of the same specimen:

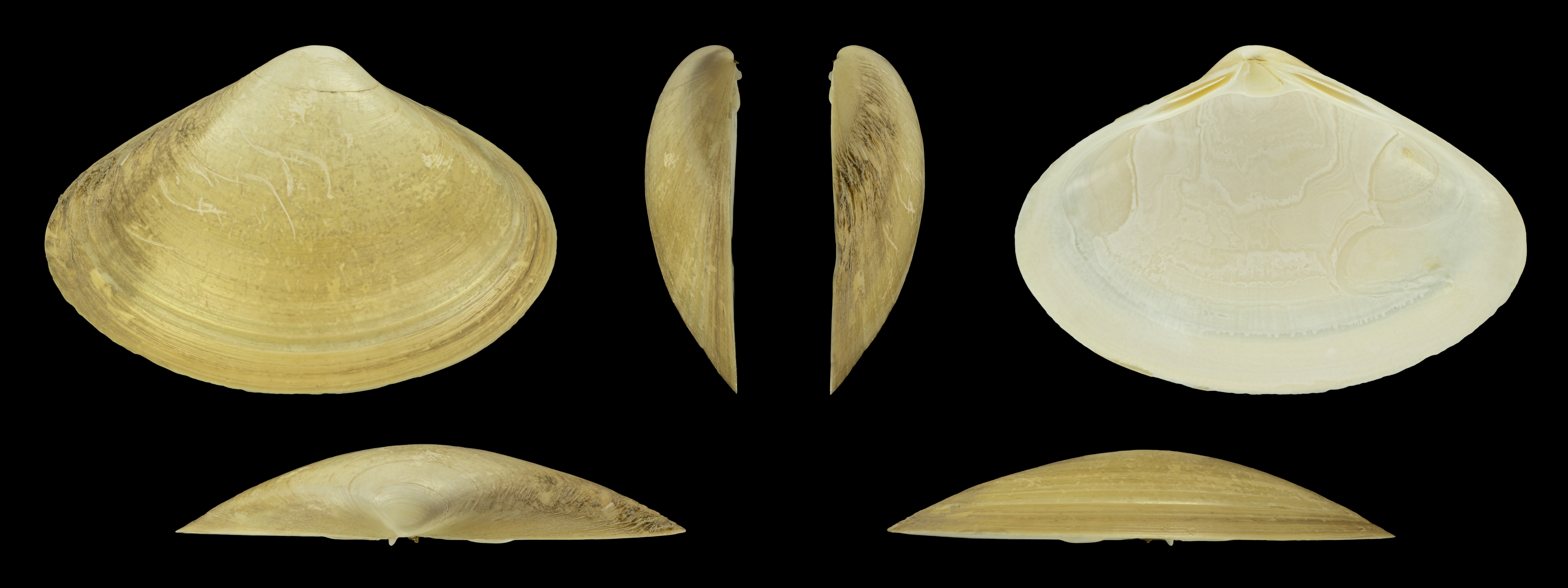
Right valve

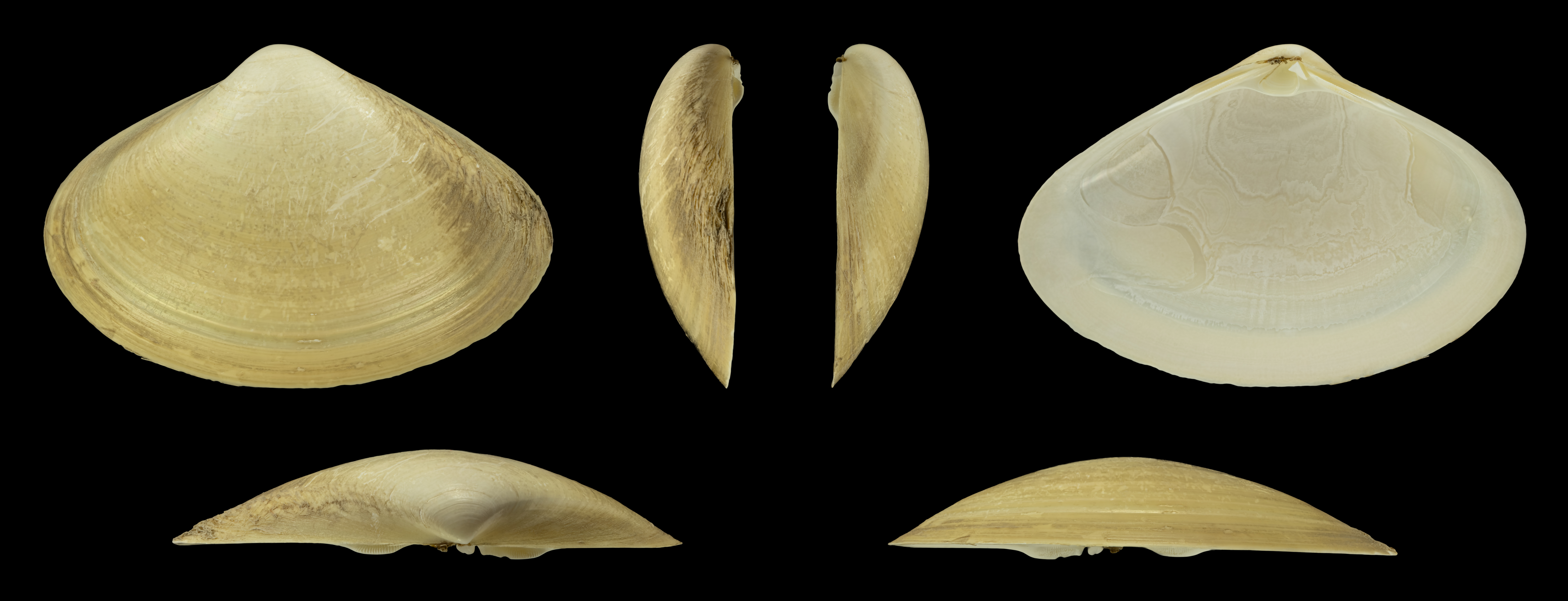
Left valve

== Distribution and habitat ==
This common species occurs off the east coast of North America from New Brunswick to South Carolina.

Atlantic surf clams live buried in coarse or fine sand. They live offshore as well as in the low intertidal and surf zones.

== Life habits ==
Surf clams can take as little as three months to reach maturity off the New Jersey coast, or as long as four years off Nova Scotia, and can reach an age of 35 years.

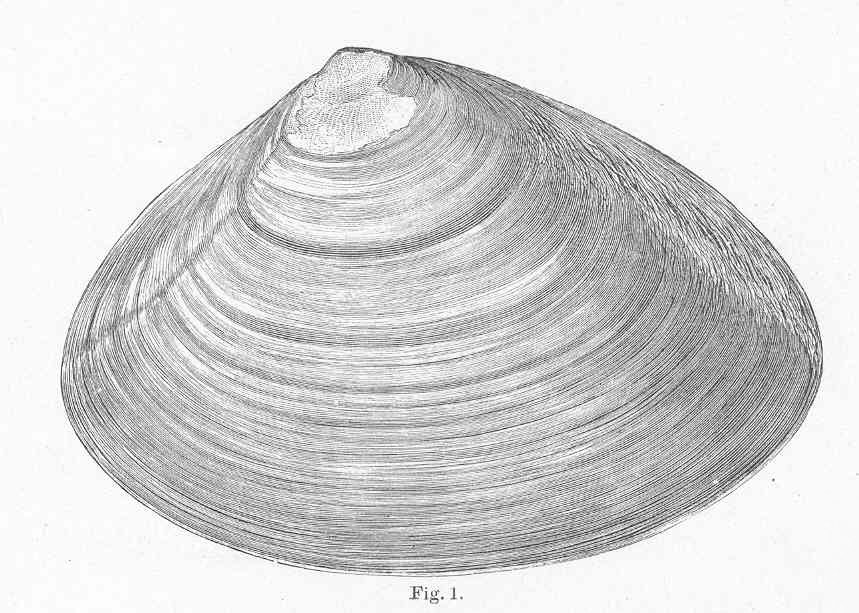
A drawing showing clearly the lines of growth

The shells of surf clams show growth rings and can demonstrate changes in the environment of the individual. The shells are formed by calcification, as the clam deposits calcium carbonate into the shell via either diet or metabolism. Pausing of growth due to internal or external factors appear marked by dark lines of growth on the shell. Younger clams have a faster growth rate than older clams. They can reach sizes of up to 8.9 inches (23 cm), though sizes larger than 7.9 inches (20 cm) are rare.

These clams use their siphons to pull in and then filter fine particles of organic matter and plankton from the surrounding seawater. Like almost all clams, they are filter feeders.

Predators of the Atlantic surf clam include snails, fish (including cod), crabs, and sea stars.

== Reproduction ==
Atlantic surf clams reproduce primarily in late summer (August–October), when the water temperatures are around their highest. Reproduction occurs via external fertilization. The sex cells are released via the passage of water through the clam, the same path taken for respiration and digestion. There are five described stages of development of the sexual organs of both male and female surf clams: early active phase, late active phase, ripe, partially spawned, and spent, with ripe phase being the main phase during which clams reproduce.

== Human use ==
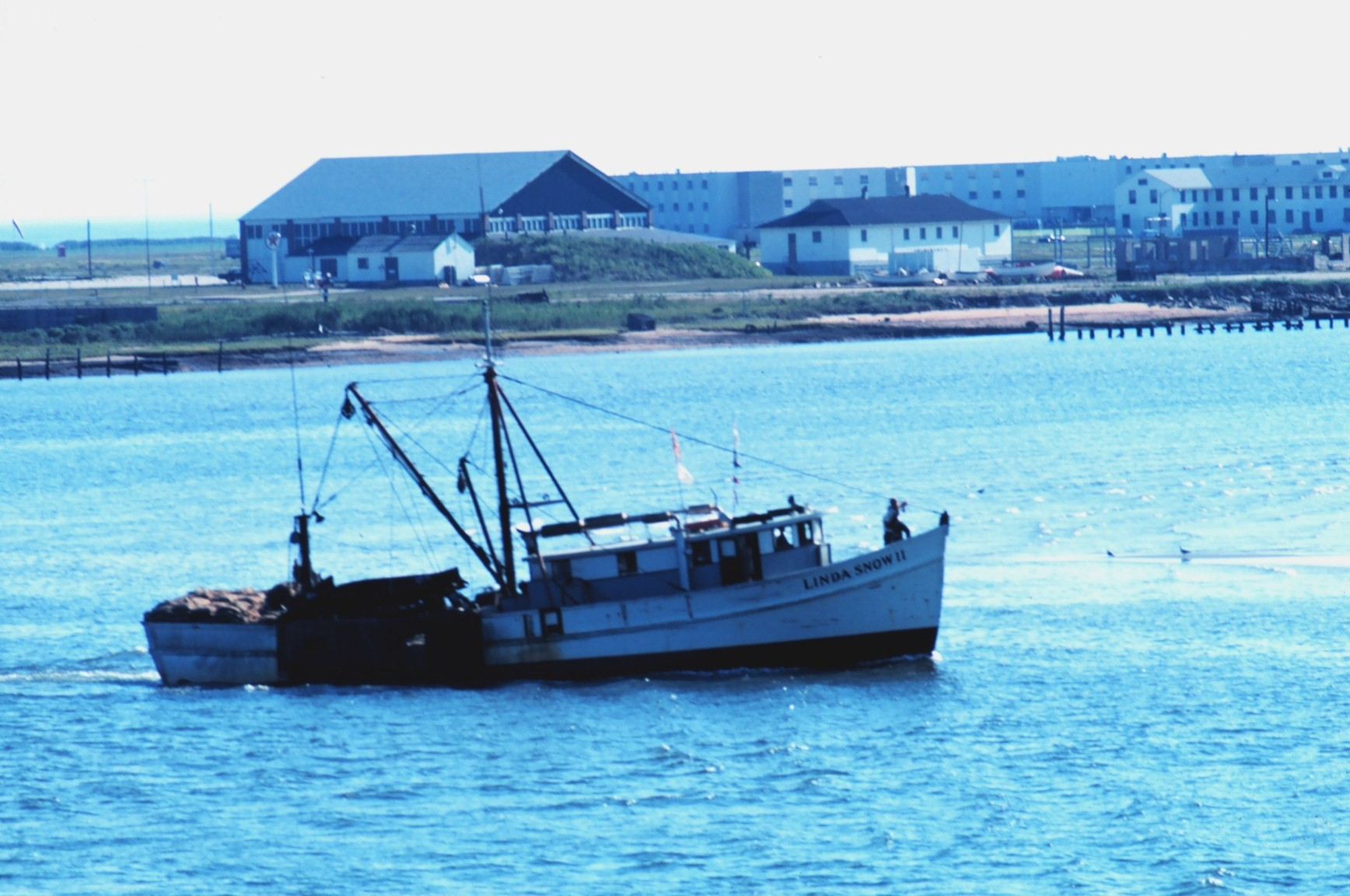
Fishing boat deploying a clam dredge in nearshore waters in Cape May, New Jersey, United States

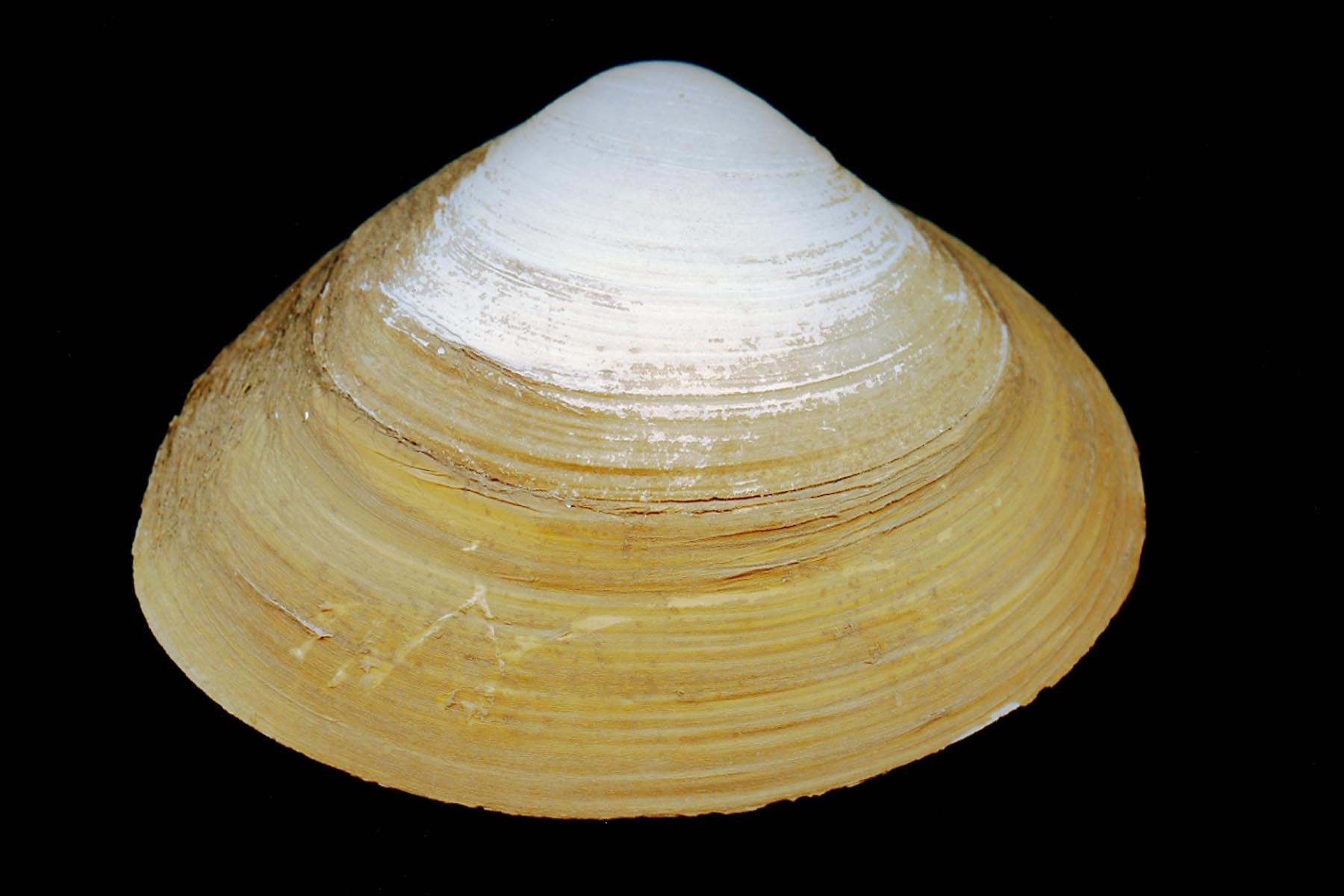
An 8 cm juvenile valve of Spisula solidissima

Global capture production of Atlantic surf clam (Spisula solidissima) in thousand tonnes from 1950 to 2022, as reported by the FAO

This species is a commercially exploited species, long prized for its sweet flavor. This species is typically harvested from fishing vessels known as dredgers, which use a specialized fishing dredge equipped with high-power hydraulic jets designed to fluidize the sea floor so as to loosen clams from the sediments before it scoops them up.

About two-thirds of a surf clam's shucked weight is viable for human consumption. The meat of the clam is used as 'strips', chowder, and sushi.

The "tongue" or foot of the clam is commercially valuable because it is cut into long strips which are breaded and fried and served as clam strips, first popularized by the Howard Johnson's franchise.

The meat that is left over is separated from the "belly" and is referred to as "salvage" within the clam industry. This meat includes the adductor muscles, which are the strong muscles that close the two halves of the shell and which tightly hold the clam's shell in the shut position. "Salvage" is typically ground up for use in chowders, sauces, and dips, and is commercially available either in cans or frozen. Locally it is available fresh. The substantial "belly" of the clam is used by some fishermen as bait for striped bass and other species.
