= Aoba Station =

Railway station in Tomakomai, Hokkaido, Japan

Aoba Station 青葉駅
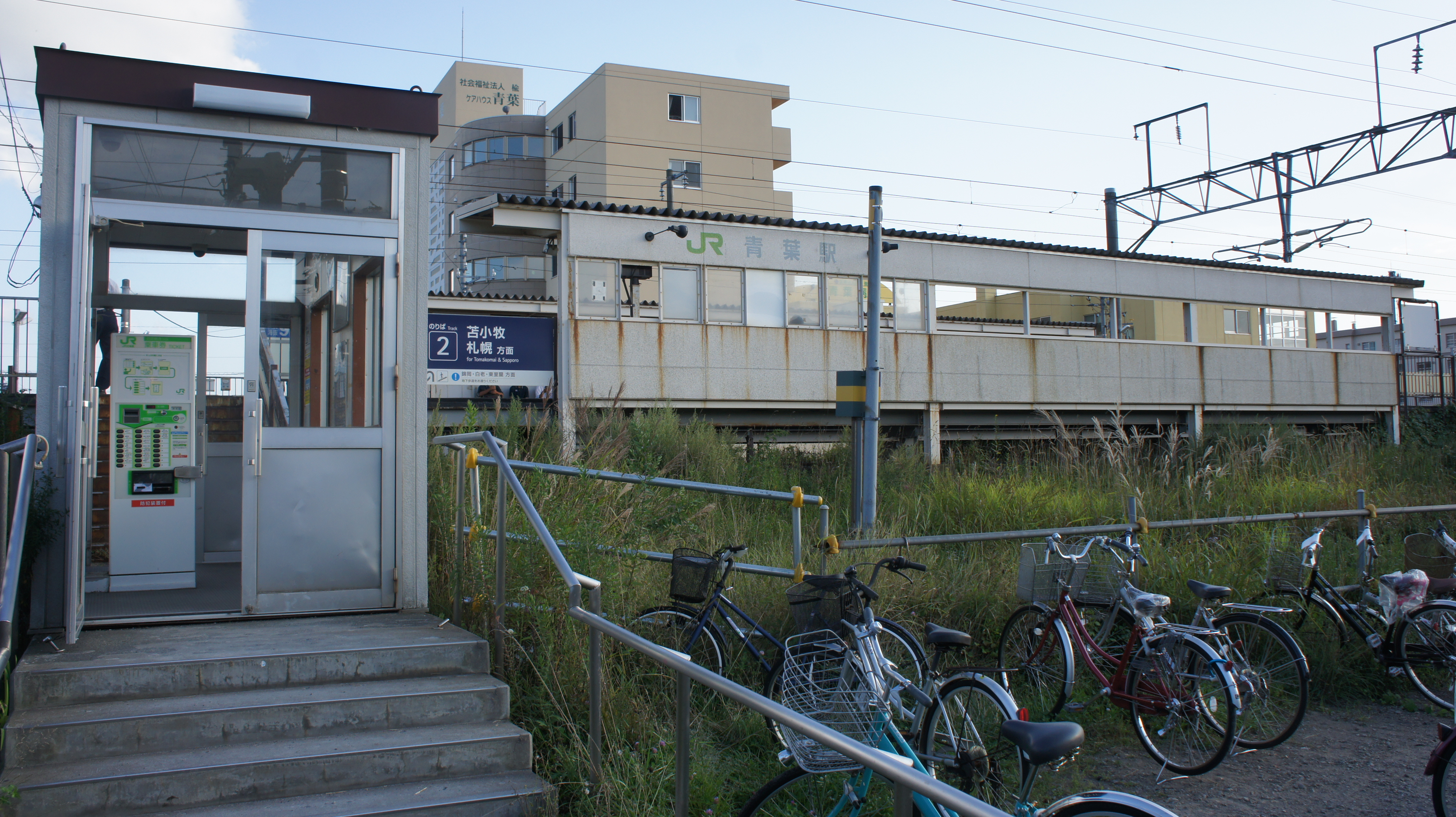

General information
- Location: Tomakomai, Hokkaidō; Japan
- Coordinates: 42.6298°N 141.5681°E
- Operator: Hokkaido Railway Company
- Line: Muroran Main Line

Other information
- Station code: H19
Location

Aoba Station (青葉駅, Aoba-eki) is a train station in Tomakomai, Hokkaidō, Japan operated by the Hokkaido Railway Company. It is served by the Muroran Main Line.

== Station Layout ==
The station consists of two side platforms serving two tracks. An underground passage connects the two platforms. A small station building is located at platform 2.

== History ==
The station opened on November 3, 1988.

== Etymology ==
The station is named after the local district which the station is located in.

== Adjacent stations ==
| « | Service | » |
Muroran Main Line
| Itoi | - | Tomakomai |
