= Tomakomai =

Tomakomai 苫小牧市
- City
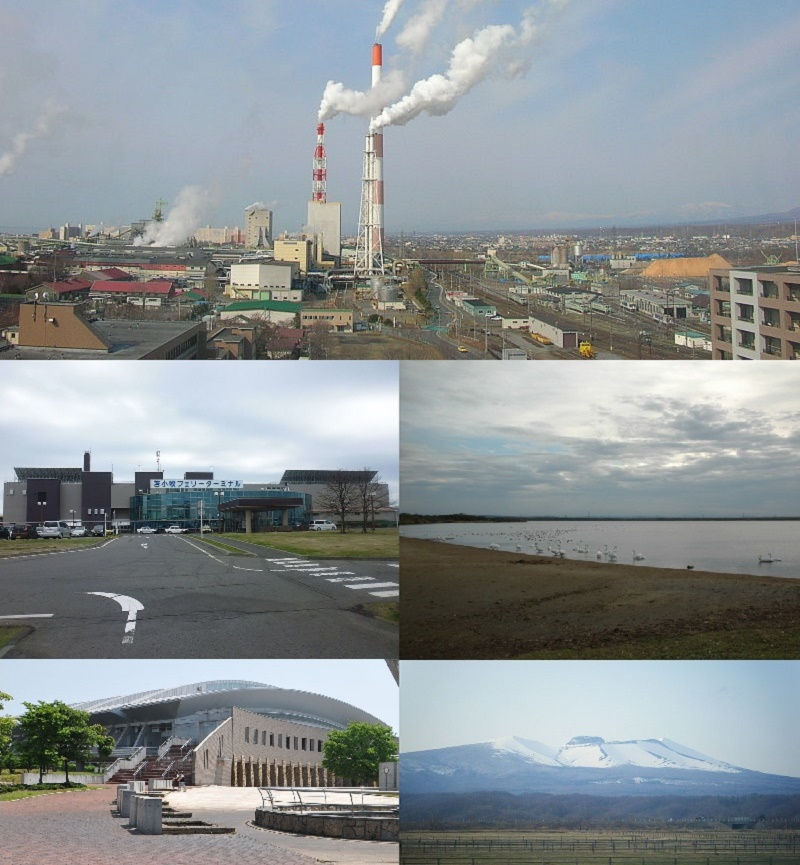

- Flag Seal

- Location of Tomakomai in Hokkaido (Iburi Subprefecture)

- Location in Japan Location in Hokkaido
- Coordinates: 42°38′N 141°36′E
- Country: Japan
- Region: Hokkaido
- Prefecture: Hokkaido (Iburi Subprefecture)
- First official recorded: 1799 AD
- City settled: 1 April 1948

Government
  - Mayor: Suguru Kanazawa

Area
  - Total: 561.57 km^{2} (216.82 sq mi)

Population (July 31, 2023)
  - Total: 167,372
  - Density: 298.04/km^{2} (771.93/sq mi)
- Time zone: UTC+09:00 (JST)
- City hall address: 4-5-6 Asahimachi, Tomakomai-shi, Hokkaido; 053-8722
- Climate: Dfb
- Website: www.city.tomakomai.hokkaido.jp
- Symbols
- Bird: Swan
- Flower: Tree flower: Hasukappu (Lonicera caerulea var. emphyllocalyx); Grass flower: Hanashōbu (Iris ensata var. ensata)
- Mascot: Toma Chop
- Tree: Japanese Rowan

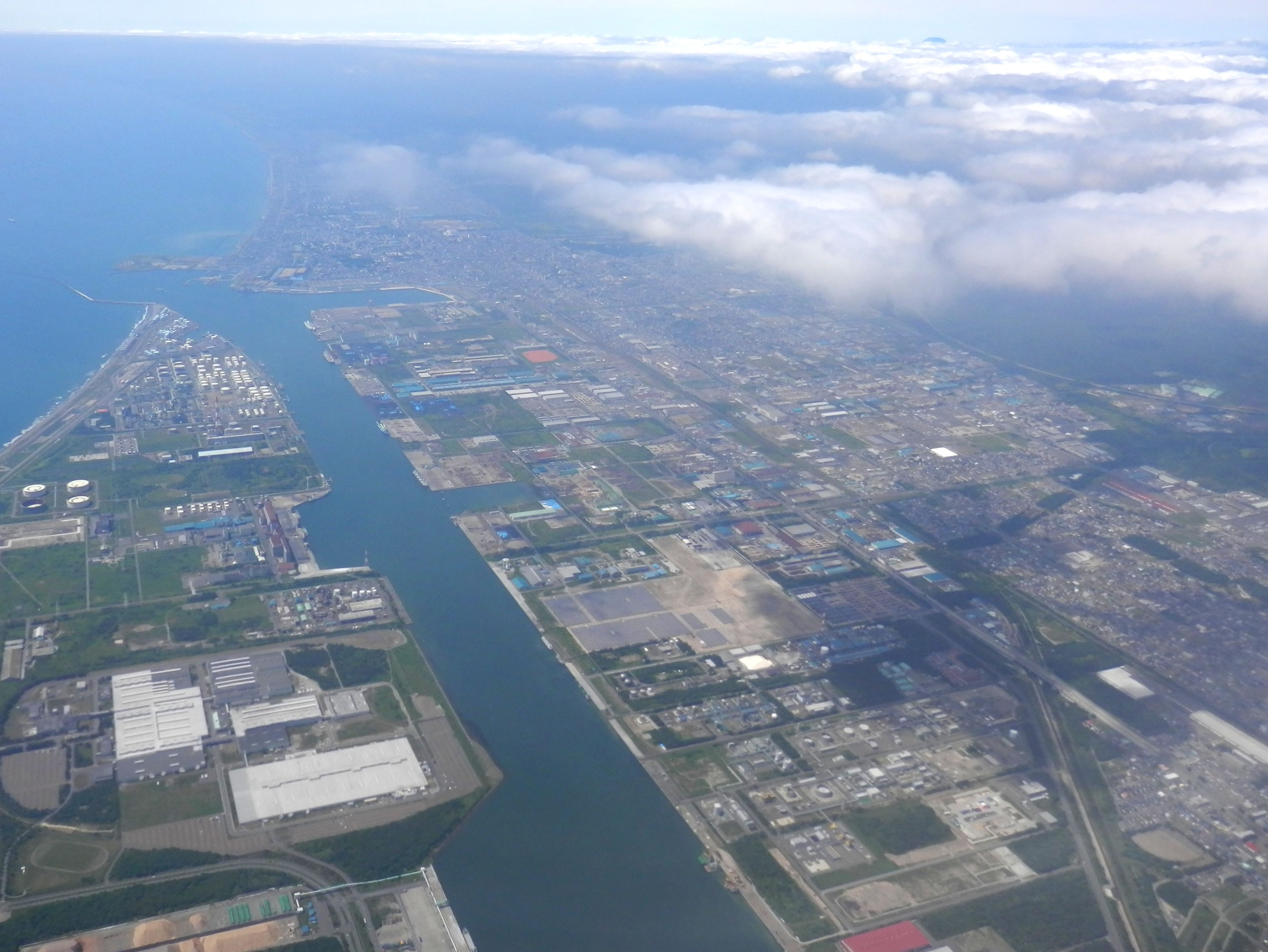
Aerial view of Tomakomai

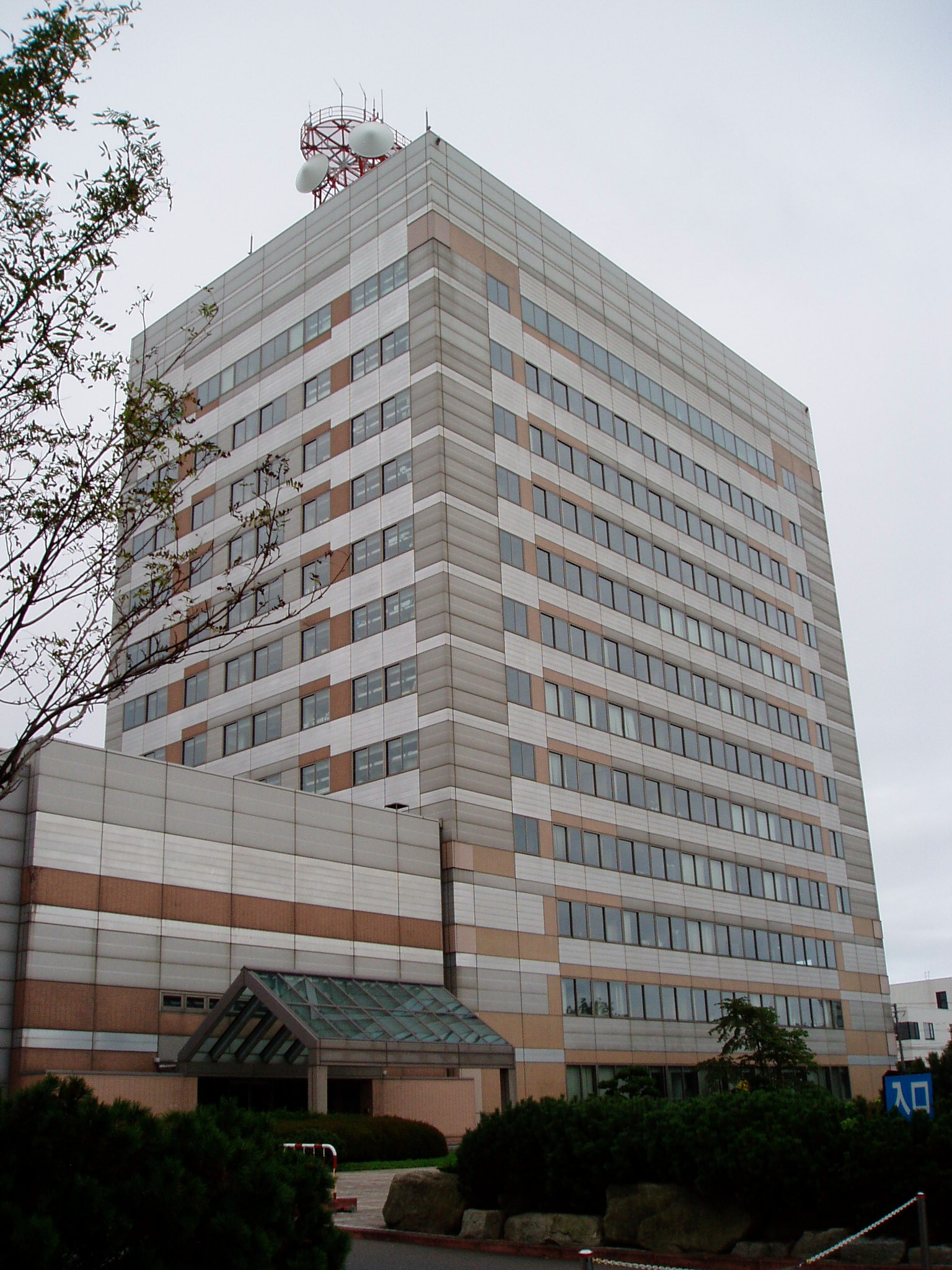
Tomakomai city hall

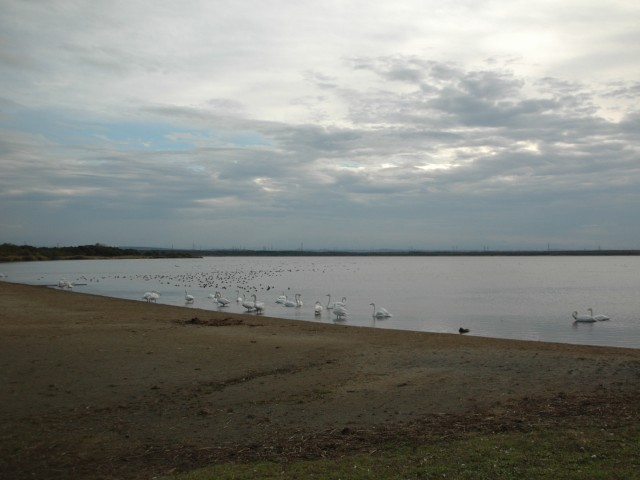
Lake Utonai

Tomakomai (苫小牧市, Tomakomai-shi) is a city and port in Iburi Subprefecture, Hokkaido, Japan. It is the largest city in the Iburi Subprefecture, and the fourth largest city in Hokkaido. As of 31 July 2023, it had an estimated population of 167,372, with 83,836 households, and a population density of 298 persons per km^{2} (770 persons per mi^{2}). The total area is 561.57 km^{2} (216.82 sq mi).

The city is known for its high catch of Arctic surf clams.

== History ==
The name of Tomakomai is derived from Ainu words "to" and "makomai", meaning "Marsh" and "River which goes into the depths of the mountain", respectively.

- 1879: Yūfutsu branch of Hokkaidō Development Commission was transferred into Tomakomai (Foundation anniversary).
- 1902: Tomakomai became second class village.
- 1918: Tomakomai village became Tomakomai town.
- 1948: Tomakomai town became Tomakomai city.
- 1963: Tomakomai Port (West) was opened.
- 1980: Tomakomai Port (East) was opened.
- 6 September 2018: Tomakomai City is the nearest city from the epicenter of the 2018 Hokkaido Eastern Iburi earthquake.

== Geography ==
Mount Tarumae is located in the northwest of Tomakomai and belongs to Shikotsu-Tōya National Park.

== Climate ==
Tomakomai has a humid continental climate typical of Hokkaido.

Climate data for Tomakomai (elevation 6.3 m, 1991–2020 normals, extremes 1942–present)
Month	Jan	Feb	Mar	Apr	May	Jun	Jul	Aug	Sep	Oct	Nov	Dec	Year
Record high °C (°F)	10.0 (50.0)	12.7 (54.9)	15.5 (59.9)	21.8 (71.2)	27.3 (81.1)	30.6 (87.1)	33.8 (92.8)	35.5 (95.9)	29.5 (85.1)	27.2 (81.0)	20.5 (68.9)	14.8 (58.6)	35.5 (95.9)
Mean maximum °C (°F)	5.6 (42.1)	6.0 (42.8)	10.9 (51.6)	16.6 (61.9)	22.1 (71.8)	25.0 (77.0)	27.3 (81.1)	29.4 (84.9)	26.9 (80.4)	21.5 (70.7)	15.8 (60.4)	9.9 (49.8)	29.6 (85.3)
Mean daily maximum °C (°F)	0.5 (32.9)	0.9 (33.6)	4.4 (39.9)	9.6 (49.3)	14.1 (57.4)	17.3 (63.1)	21.0 (69.8)	23.4 (74.1)	21.7 (71.1)	16.2 (61.2)	9.2 (48.6)	2.8 (37.0)	11.8 (53.2)
Daily mean °C (°F)	−3.6 (25.5)	−3.2 (26.2)	0.5 (32.9)	5.3 (41.5)	10.0 (50.0)	14.0 (57.2)	18.2 (64.8)	20.4 (68.7)	17.8 (64.0)	11.5 (52.7)	4.9 (40.8)	−1.2 (29.8)	7.9 (46.2)
Mean daily minimum °C (°F)	−8.1 (17.4)	−7.9 (17.8)	−3.7 (25.3)	1.3 (34.3)	6.6 (43.9)	11.5 (52.7)	16.1 (61.0)	18.0 (64.4)	13.8 (56.8)	6.4 (43.5)	0.2 (32.4)	−5.4 (22.3)	4.1 (39.4)
Mean minimum °C (°F)	−14.0 (6.8)	−14.1 (6.6)	−9.8 (14.4)	−3.8 (25.2)	1.5 (34.7)	7.1 (44.8)	12.4 (54.3)	13.3 (55.9)	7.1 (44.8)	−0.1 (31.8)	−5.9 (21.4)	−11.6 (11.1)	−15.1 (4.8)
Record low °C (°F)	−21.3 (−6.3)	−20.9 (−5.6)	−19.8 (−3.6)	−9.8 (14.4)	−4.2 (24.4)	1.8 (35.2)	6.5 (43.7)	9.2 (48.6)	2.4 (36.3)	−5.1 (22.8)	−12.6 (9.3)	−20.4 (−4.7)	−21.3 (−6.3)
Average precipitation mm (inches)	38.7 (1.52)	37.5 (1.48)	53.5 (2.11)	75.7 (2.98)	130.8 (5.15)	111.6 (4.39)	163.5 (6.44)	197.5 (7.78)	174.9 (6.89)	113.2 (4.46)	85.7 (3.37)	56.6 (2.23)	1,239.2 (48.79)
Average snowfall cm (inches)	42 (17)	42 (17)	26 (10)	2 (0.8)	0 (0)	0 (0)	0 (0)	0 (0)	0 (0)	0 (0)	4 (1.6)	29 (11)	145 (57)
Average precipitation days (≥ 0.5 mm)	11.0	10.6	13.0	11.5	11.5	11.0	13.5	13.7	12.3	11.8	11.4	11.2	142.5
Average snowy days	23.3	21.1	20.3	6.4	0.0	0.0	0.0	0.0	0.0	1.2	9.7	20.8	103.5
Average relative humidity (%)	70	70	71	74	79	86	88	86	80	74	71	70	77
Mean monthly sunshine hours	142.0	144.7	165.6	173.5	171.9	119.7	108.1	122.2	153.1	156.0	127.1	127.6	1,711.5
Source: Japan Meteorological Agency (1991–2020 normals, extremes 1942–present)

== Transportation ==
=== Airport ===
- New Chitose Airport

=== Rail ===
- Chitose Line: Numanohata - Uenae
- Hidaka Main Line: Numanohata - Yūfutsu
- Muroran Main Line: Nishikioka - Itoi - Aoba - Tomakomai - Numanohata

=== Road ===
- Hidaka Expressway
- Dō-Ō Expressway

=== Seaport ===
- Tomakomai West Port Ferry Terminal: connected with regular ferry services by MOL Ferry, Taiheiyō Ferry, K Line Kinkai.

== Education ==
=== University ===
- Hokuyou University

=== College ===
- National Institute of Technology, Tomakomai College

=== High schools ===
==== Public ====
- Hokkaido Tomakomai Higashi High School
- Hokkaido Tomakomai Minami High School
- Hokkaido Tomakomai Nishi High School
- Hokkaido Tomakomai Sogokeizai High School
- Hokkaido Tomakomai Technical High School

==== Private ====
- Komazawa University Tomakomai High School
- Tomakomai Chuo High School

== Sports ==
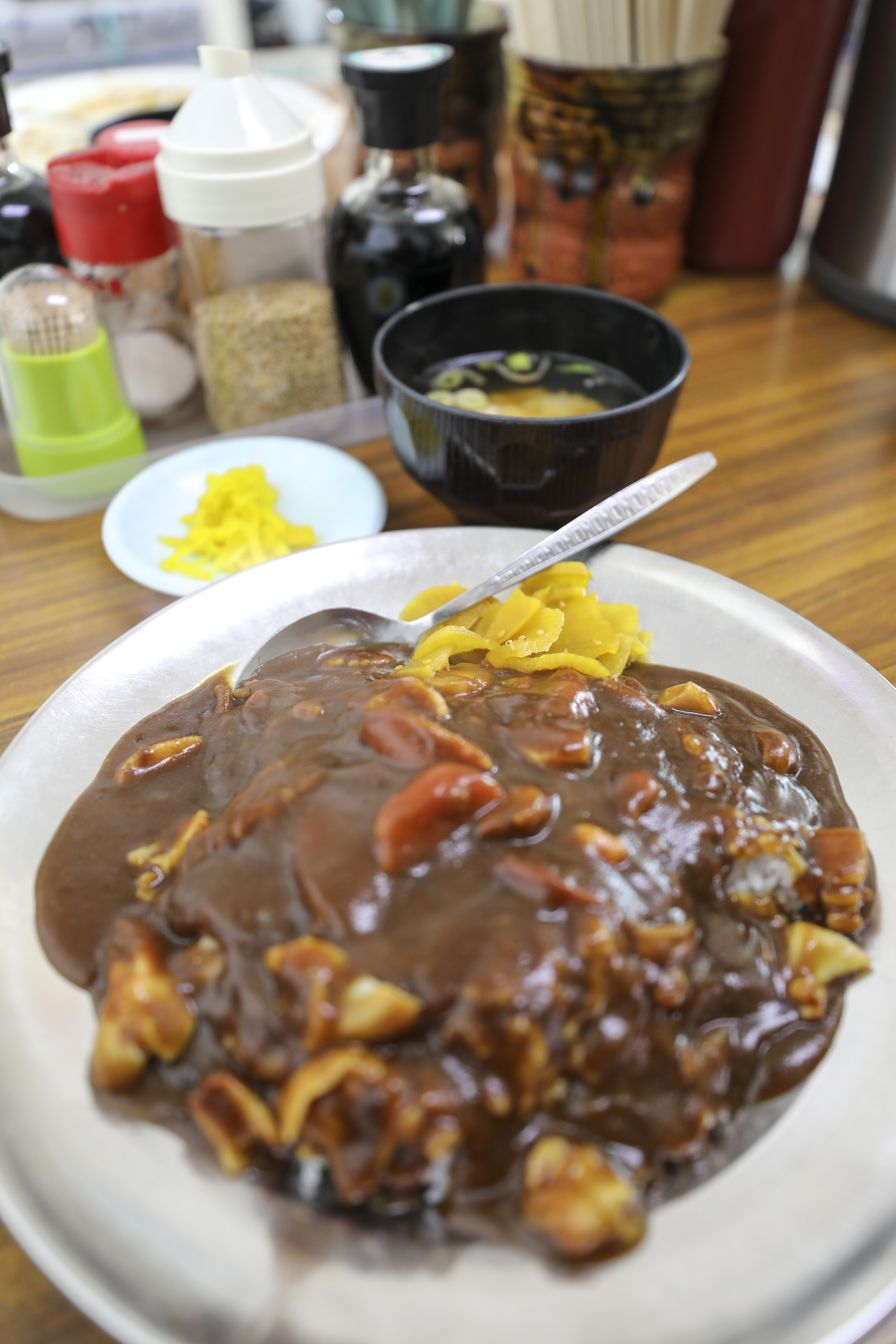
Arctic surf clam curry, which the city is known for

In 2014, Tomakomai hosted the World Broomball Championships.

Tomakomai is home to the Asia League Ice Hockey team Red Eagles Hokkaido.

== Sister cities and friendship cities ==
=== Sister cities ===
- Hachioji, Tokyo, Japan (since 1973)
- Napier, Hawke's Bay Region, New Zealand (since 1980)
- Nikko, Tochigi, Japan (since 1982)

=== Friendship city ===
- Qinhuangdao, Hebei, China (since 1998)

== Notable people from Tomakoma ==
- Tsutomu Kawabuchi, ice hockey player and coach, member of the IIHF Hall of Fame
- Asami Kimura, singer in Hello! Project and former Country Musume member and leader
- Eiichi Kudo, film director
- Ippei Mizuhara, Interpreter for Major League Baseball
- Takuya Onodera, professional wrestler best known as T-Hawk
- Kei Sanbe, manga artist
- Naoki Sano, professional wrestler
- Hisayoshi Sato, swimmer
- Shokichi, member of Exile and Exile The Second

== See also ==
- Hokko Tarumae, a racehorse and the tourism ambassador of Tomakomai
