= Hokuyo University =

Private university

Coordinates: 42°36′2.8″N 141°28′3.2″E

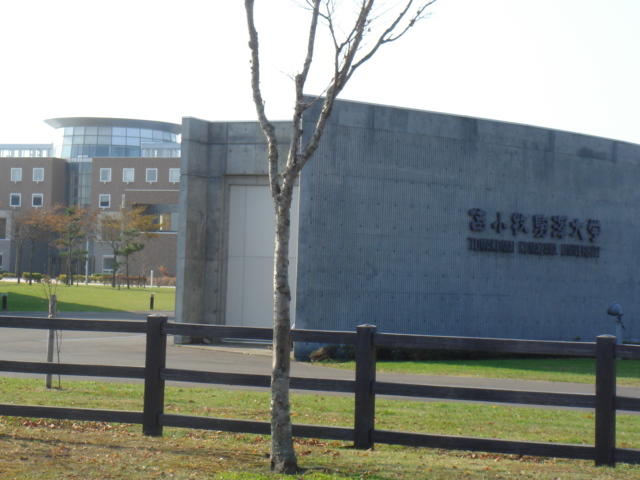
Tomakomai Komazawa University

Tomakomai Komazawa University (苫小牧駒澤大学, Tomakomai komazawa daigaku) is a private university in Tomakomai, Hokkaido, Japan, established in 1998. The predecessor of the school was founded in 1965.
