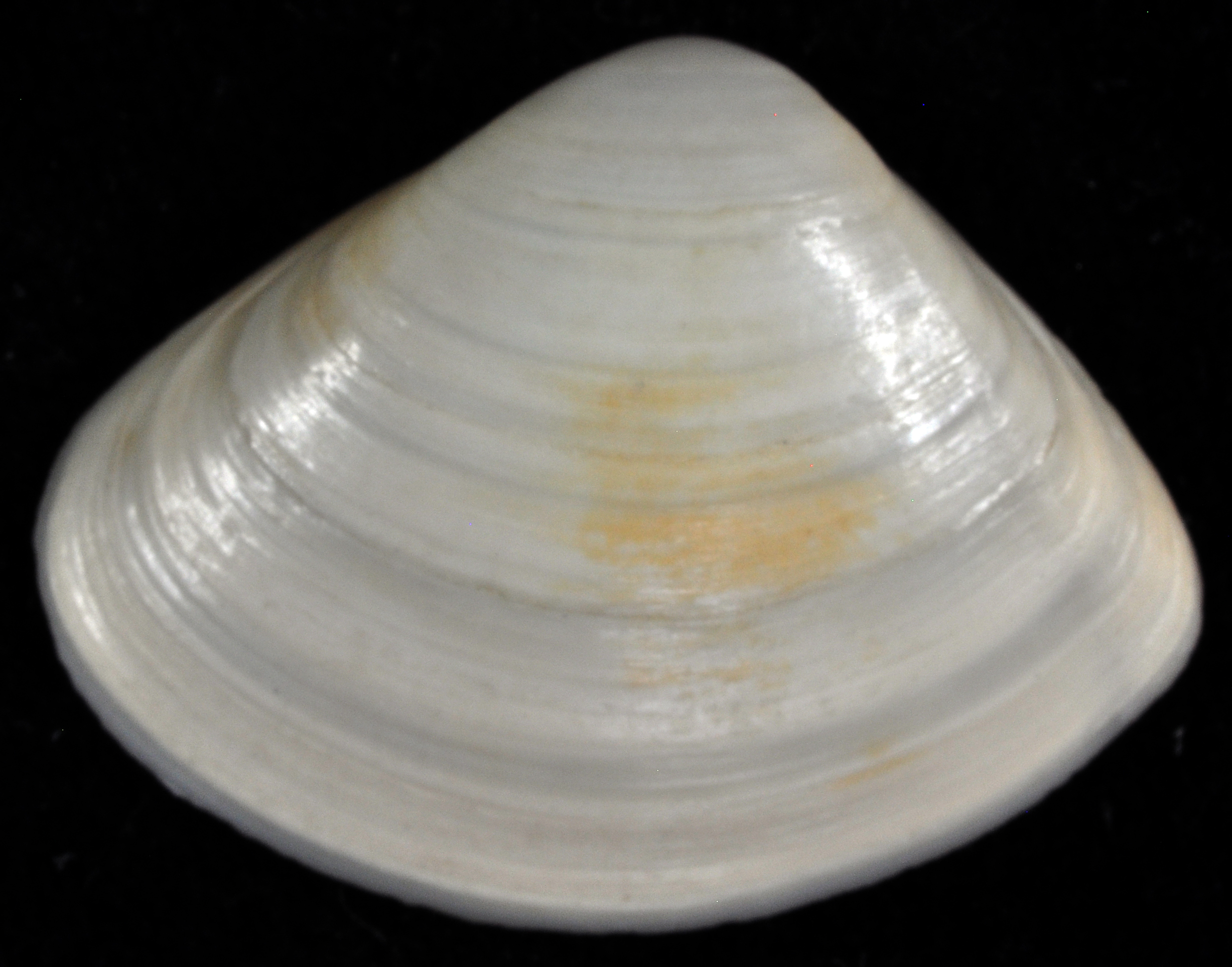
- One valve of Spisula adamsi (specimen at MNHN, Paris)

Scientific classification
- Kingdom: Animalia
- Phylum: Mollusca
- Class: Bivalvia
- Order: Venerida
- Superfamily: Mactroidea
- Family: Mactridae
- Subfamily: Mactrinae
- Genus: Spisula; Gray, 1837

Type species
- Cardium solidum Linnaeus, 1758

Species
- See text.

Synonyms
- Hemimactra Swainson, 1840; Notospisula Iredale, 1930; Spisula (Hemimactra) Swainson, 1840 alternate representation; Spisula (Notospisula) Iredale, 1930; † Spisula (Ruellia) Cossmann, 1913 · alternate representation; Spisula (Spisula) Gray, 1837 · alternate representation; Spisula (Spisulona) Marwick, 1948 · alternate representation; Spisulina P. Fischer, 1887; † Spisulona Marwick, 1948

= Spisula =

Genus of bivalves

Spisula is a genus of medium-sized to large marine bivalve mollusks or clams in the subfamily Mactrinae of the family Mactridae, commonly known as surf clams or trough shells.

== Species ==
Species in the genus Spisula include:

- Spisula adamsi Olsson, 1961
- Spisula austini Lamprell & Whitehead, 1990
- †Spisula bernayi (Cossmann, 1886)
- † Spisula brombachensis S. Schneider & Mandic, 2014
- † Spisula couttsi Marwick, 1948
- † Spisula crassitesta (Finlay, 1927)
- Spisula discors (Gray, 1837)
- Spisula elliptica (T. Brown, 1827)
- Spisula murchisoni (Reeve, 1854)
- Spisula raveneli (Conrad, 1832)
- Spisula sachalinensis (Schrenck, 1862)
- Spisula solida (Linnaeus, 1758)
- Spisula solidissima (Dillwyn, 1817) – Atlantic surfclam
- Spisula subtruncata (da Costa, 1778)
- Spisula trigonella (Lamarck, 1818)
- † Spisula voyi (Gabb, 1866)

Synonyms

- Spisula adelaidae Angas, 1865: synonym of Anapella cycladea (Lamarck, 1818)
- Spisula aequilateralis (Deshayes, 1854) – Triangle shell: synonym of Crassula aequilatera (Reeve, 1854)
- Spisula alaskana Dall, 1921: synonym of Mactromeris polynyma (Stimpson, 1860)
- Spisula aspersa (G. B. Sowerby I, 1825): synonym of Oxyperas aspersa (G. B. Sowerby I, 1825): synonym of Oxyperas aspersum'' (G. B. Sowerby I, 1825)
- Spisula belliana W. R. B. Oliver, 1915: synonym of Oxyperas belliana (W. R. B. Oliver, 1915): synonym of Oxyperas bellianum (W. R. B. Oliver, 1915)
- Spisula bernardi Pilsbry, 1904: synonym of Oxyperas bernardi (Pilsbry, 1904)
- Spisula camaronis Dall, 1921: synonym of Mactromeris hemphillii (Dall, 1894)
- Spisula catilliformis Conrad, 1867: synonym of Mactromeris catilliformis (Conrad, 1867)
- Spisula cretacea Angas, 1868: synonym of Spisula trigonella (Lamarck, 1818)
- Spisula dolabriformis Conrad, 1867: synonym of Simomactra dolabriformis (Conrad, 1867) (original combination)
- Spisula fragilis Gray, 1837: synonym of Standella pellucida (Gmelin, 1791)
- Spisula hemphillii (Dall, 1894): synonym of Mactromeris hemphillii (Dall, 1894)
- Spisula isabelleana (d'Orbigny, 1846): synonym of Mactra isabelleana d'Orbigny, 1846
- Spisula lamarckii Gray, 1837: synonym of Eastonia rugosa (Helbling, 1779)
- Spisula lentiginosa Gould, 1852: synonym of Oxyperas lentiginosa (Gould, 1852): synonym of Oxyperas lentiginosum (Gould, 1852)
- Spisula longa Dall, 1921: synonym of Tresus nuttallii (Conrad, 1837)
- Spisula marplatensis (Doello-Jurado, 1949): synonym of Mactra marplatensis Doello-Jurado, 1949
- Spisula ovalis (J. Sowerby, 1817) : synonym of Spisula solida (Linnaeus, 1758)
- Spisula ovata Gray, 1843: synonym of Cyclomactra ovata (Gray, 1843)
- Spisula petitii (d'Orbigny, 1846): synonym of Mactra petitii d'Orbigny, 1846
- Spisula polynyma (Stimpson, 1860): synonym of Mactromeris polynyma (Stimpson, 1860)
- Spisula producta Angas, 1868: synonym of Spisula trigonella (Lamarck, 1818)
- Spisula richmondi (Dall, 1894): synonym of Mactra petitii d'Orbigny, 1846
- Spisula sayii Gray, 1837: synonym of Spisula raveneli (Conrad, 1832)
- Spisula solanderi J.E. Gray, 1837: synonym of Eastonia solanderi (J. E. Gray, 1837)
- Spisula strongi T. A. Burch, 1945: synonym of Simomactra planulata (Conrad, 1837)
- Spisula triangula (Brocchi, 1814): synonym of Spisula subtruncata (da Costa, 1778)
- Spisula vladivostokensis Bartsch, 1929: synonym of Mactromeris polynyma (Stimpson, 1860)
- Spisula voji [sic]: synonym of † Spisula voyi (Gabb, 1866)
- Spisula williamsi (Berry, 1960): synonym of Spisula adamsi Olsson, 1961
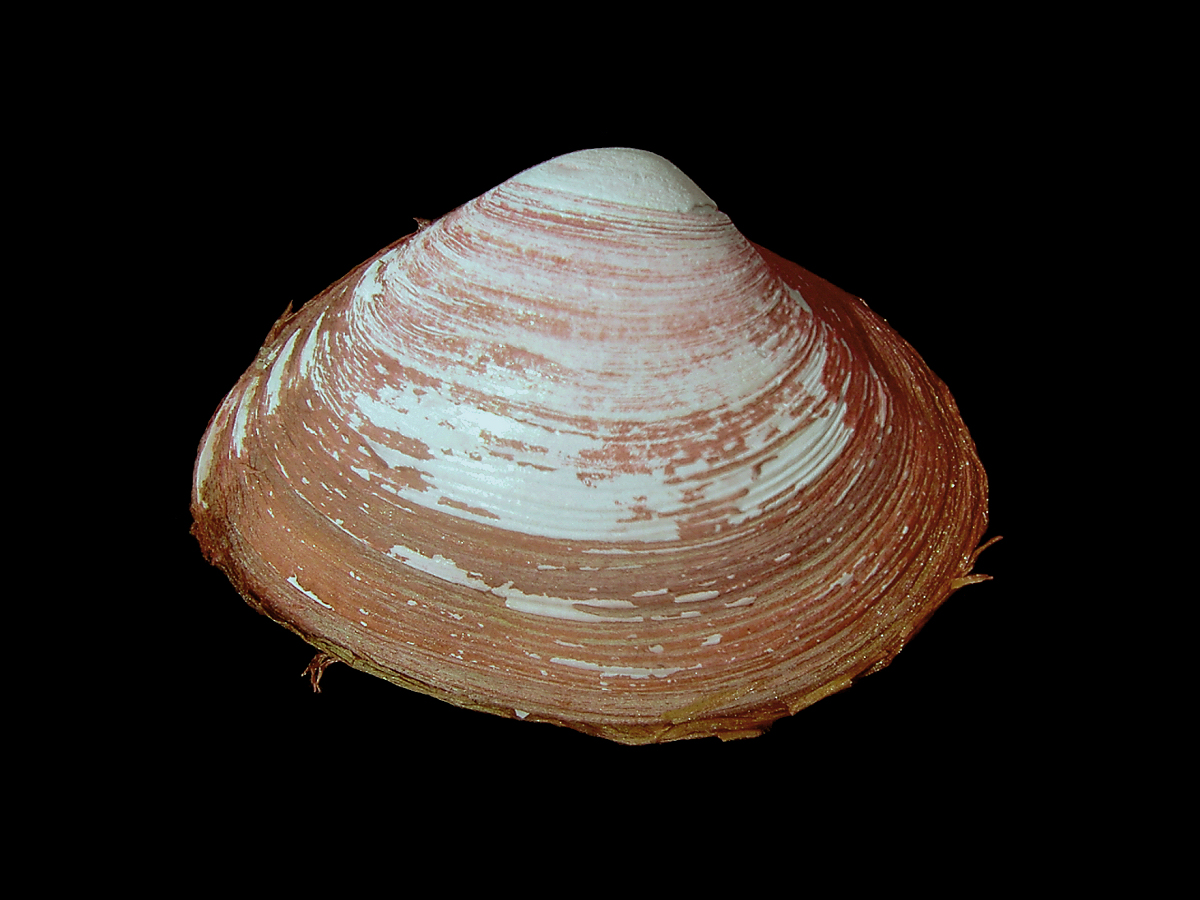
Spisula subtruncata
