= Nishikioka Station =

Railway station in Tomakomai, Hokkaido, Japan

Coordinates: 42.6024°N 141.4868°E

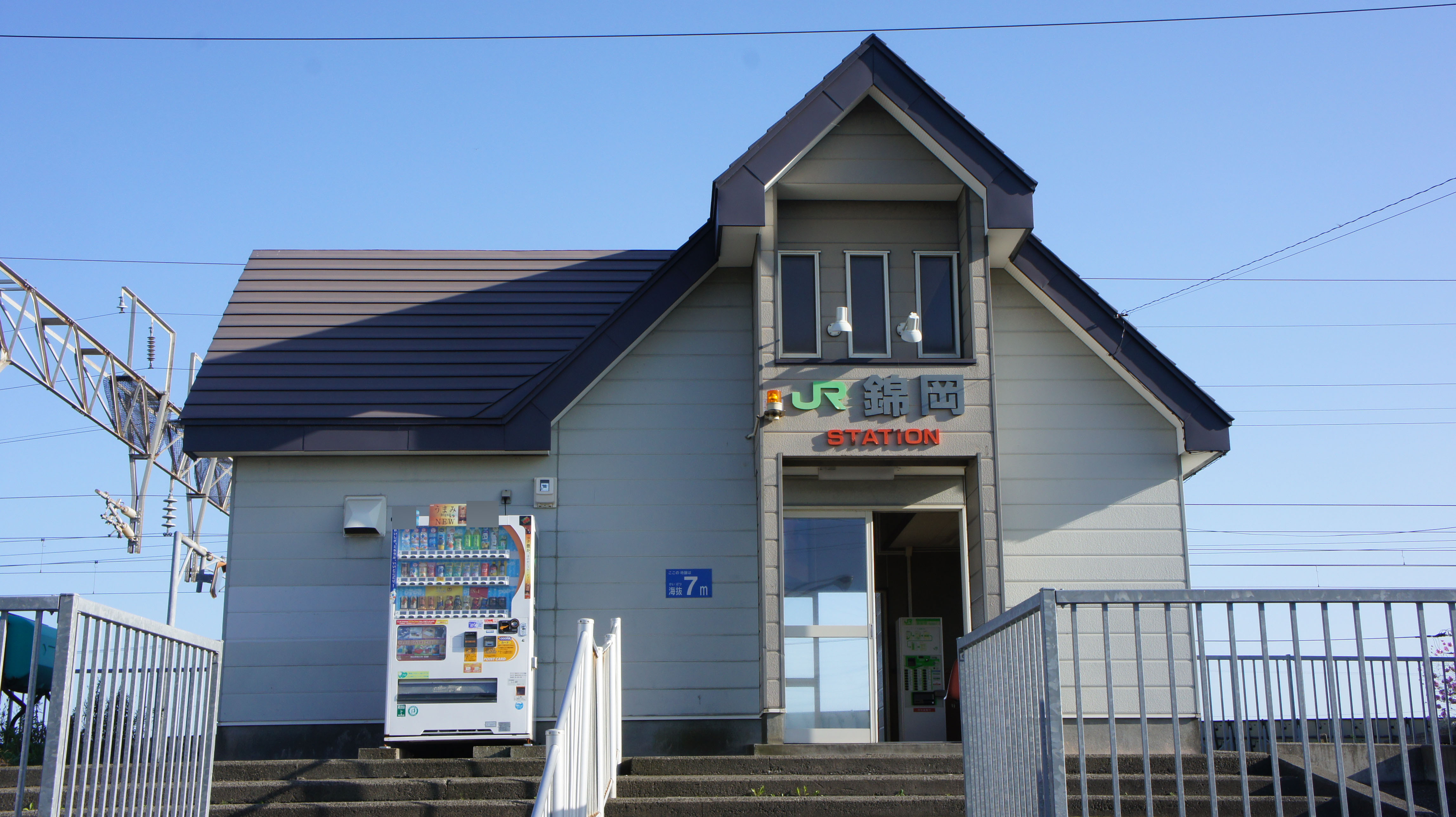
Nishikioka Station

Nishikioka Station (錦岡駅, Nishikioka-eki) is a train station in Tomakomai, Hokkaidō, Japan.

== Lines ==
- Hokkaido Railway Company
  - Muroran Main Line Station H21

== Adjacent stations ==
| « | Service | » |
Muroran Main Line
| Shadai | - | Itoi |
