= Shadai Station =

Railway station in Shiraoi, Hokkaido, Japan

Coordinates: 42.5793°N 141.4177°E

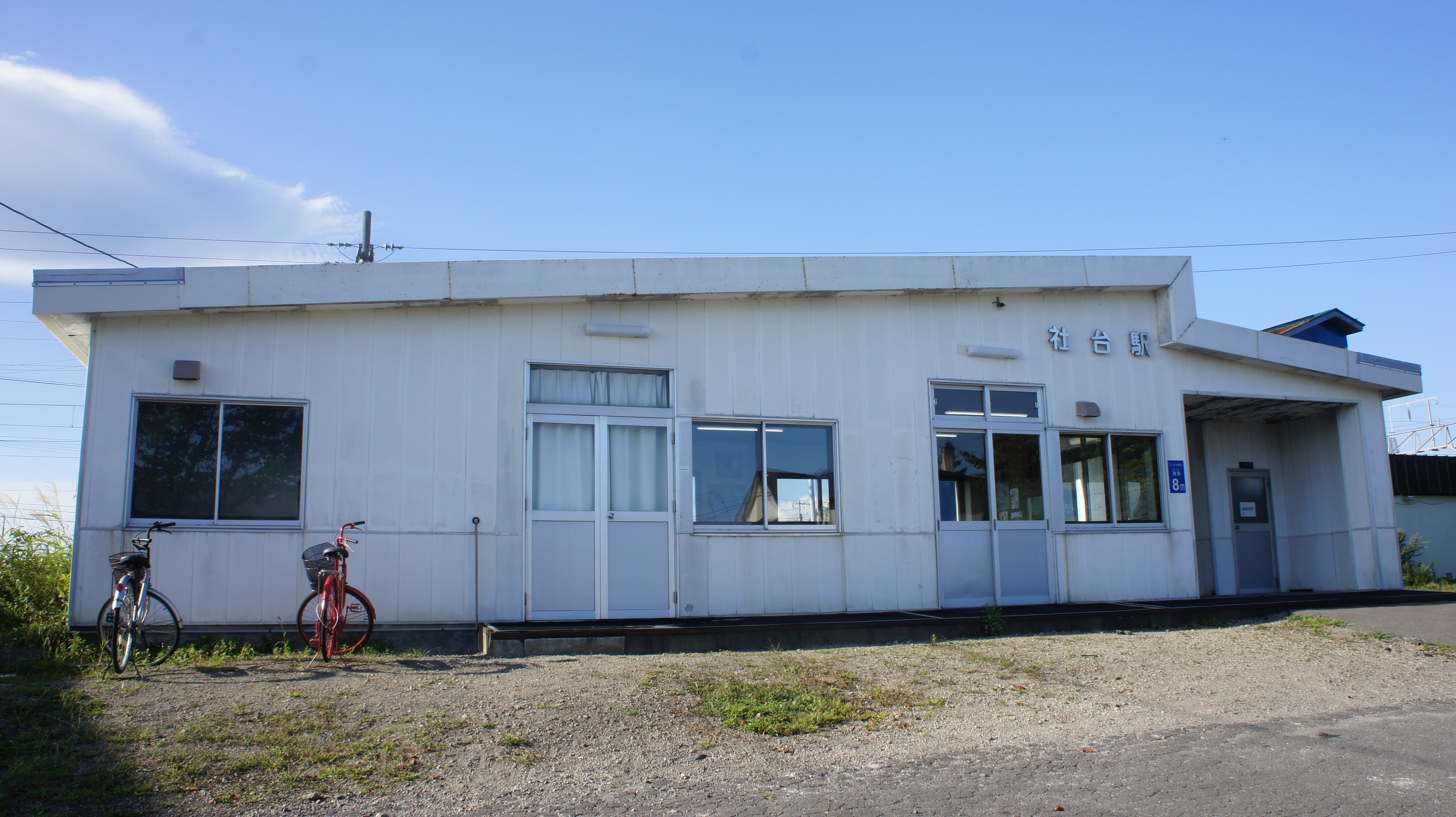
Station building

Shadai Station (社台駅, Shadai-eki) is a train station in Shiraoi, Shiraoi District, Hokkaidō, Japan.

== Lines ==
- Hokkaido Railway Company
  - Muroran Main Line Station H22

== Adjacent stations ==
| « | Service | » |
Muroran Main Line
| Shiraoi | - | Nishikioka |
