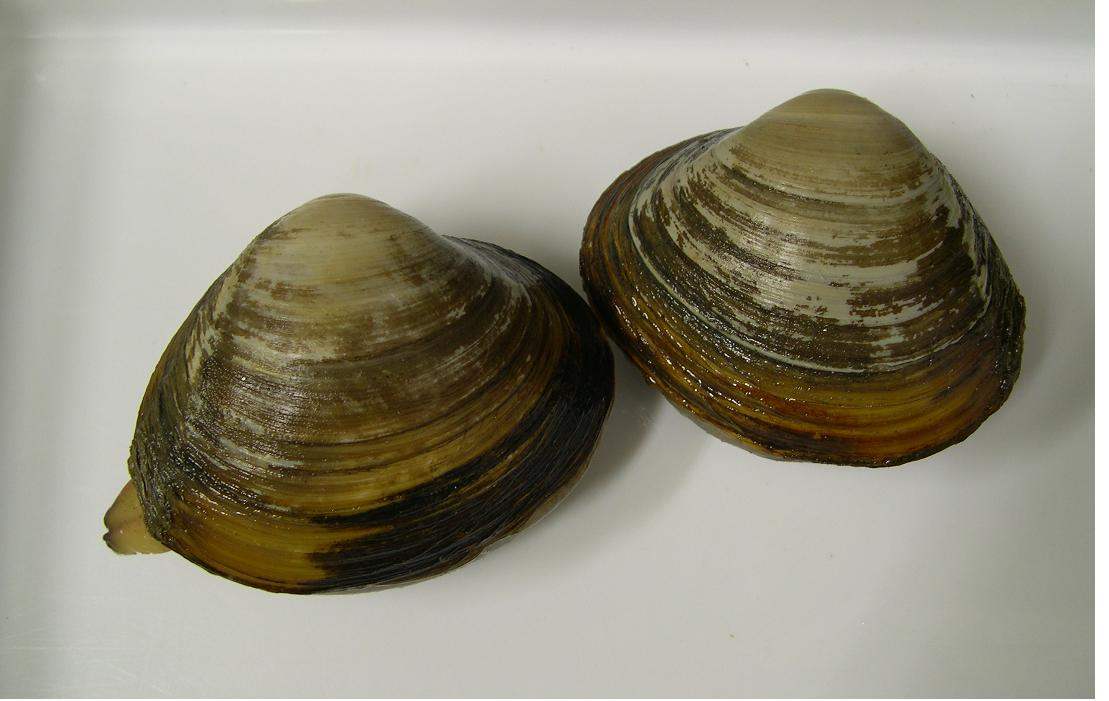

Scientific classification
- Kingdom: Animalia
- Phylum: Mollusca
- Class: Bivalvia
- Order: Venerida
- Family: Mactridae
- Subfamily: Mactrinae
- Genus: Spisula
- Species: S. sachalinensis

Binomial name
- Spisula sachalinensis (Schrenck, 1862)

Synonyms
- Pseudocardium sachalinense Schrenck, 1862

= Spisula sachalinensis =

Species of bivalve

Spisula sachalinensis (Japanese: 姥貝, Ubagai or 北寄貝, Hokkigai; Uilta: Sarukki), the Sakhalin surf clam, is a species of edible saltwater clam in the family Mactridae, the surf clams or trough clams. It is commonly referred to as surf clam or Arctic surf clam, though the latter can also refer to the closely related Mactromeris polynyma (Stimpson's surf clam).

The species is commercially exploited and widely used for sushi in Japan. The species is found in Tomakomai, Hokkaido, and numerous other areas.

== Nomenclature ==
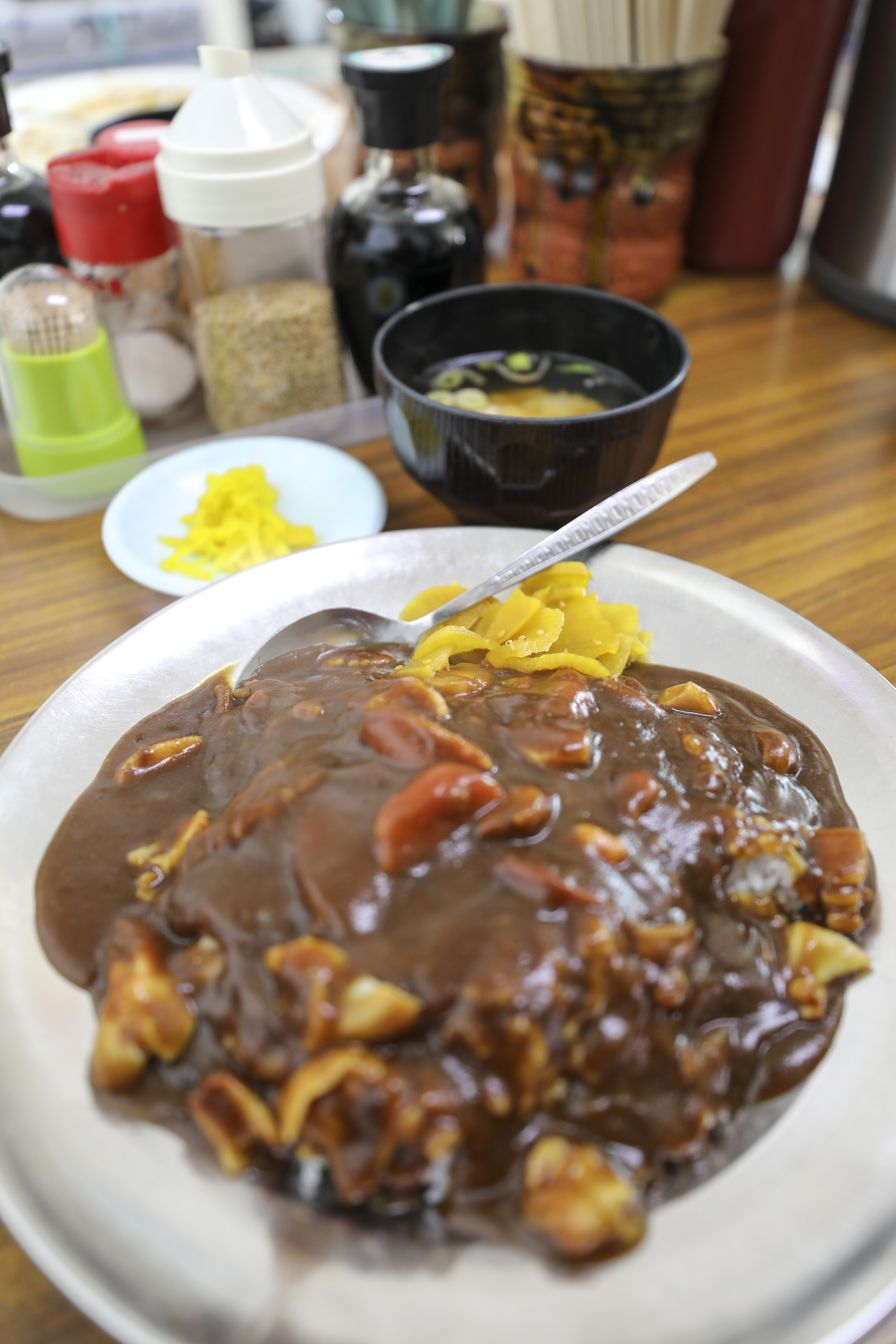
Surf clam curry, a specialty of Tomakomai city in Hokkaido

In Japan, the technical name is ubagai ("old woman's clam"). However, in the Hokkaido region, it is called hokkigai ("northern clam"). In the Ainu language, it is called poksey or tutturep.

== Description ==
Arctic surf clams grow to around 10 cm, and can live up to 30 years in shallow waters.

== As food ==
Arctic surf clam is eaten in Japan, usually as sushi or sashimi. The foot of the clam is black when raw, but turns characteristically red when cooked. It can also be used in rice dishes like takikomi gohan. In the city of Tomakomai, where the most surf clams are caught in Japan, the clam is also made into a curry.

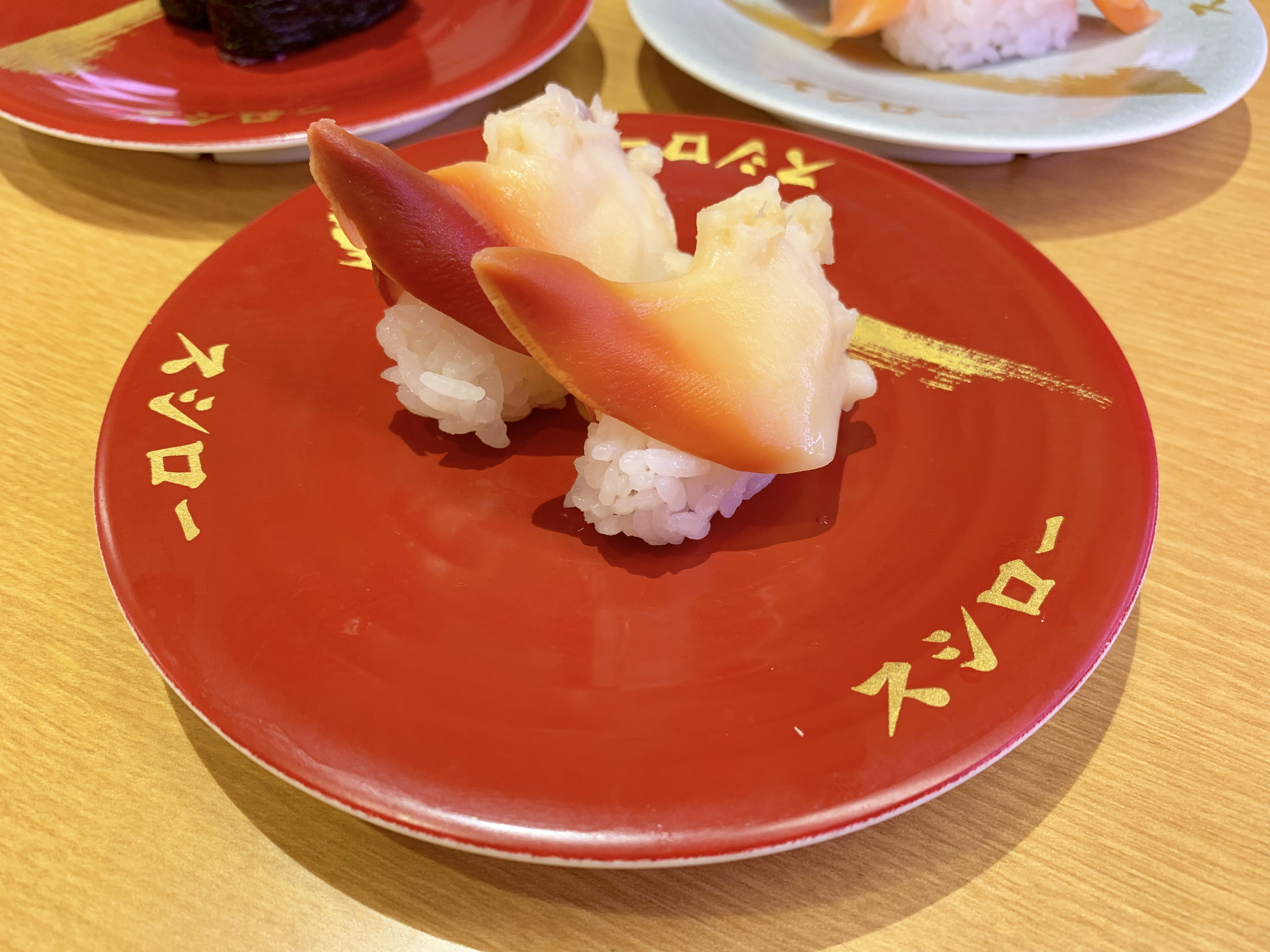
Nigirizushi with surf clam (hokkigai)

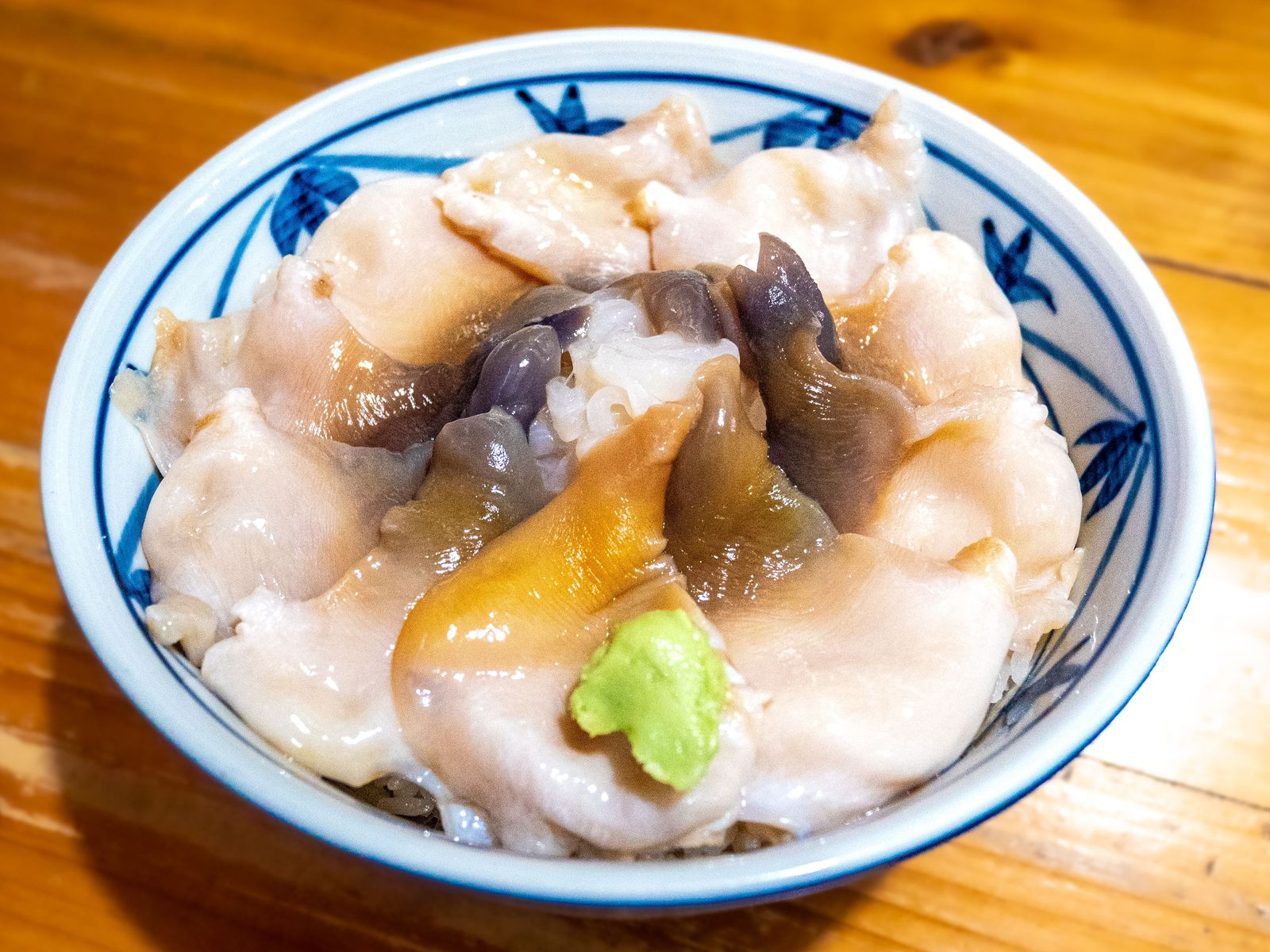
Rice with raw surf clam

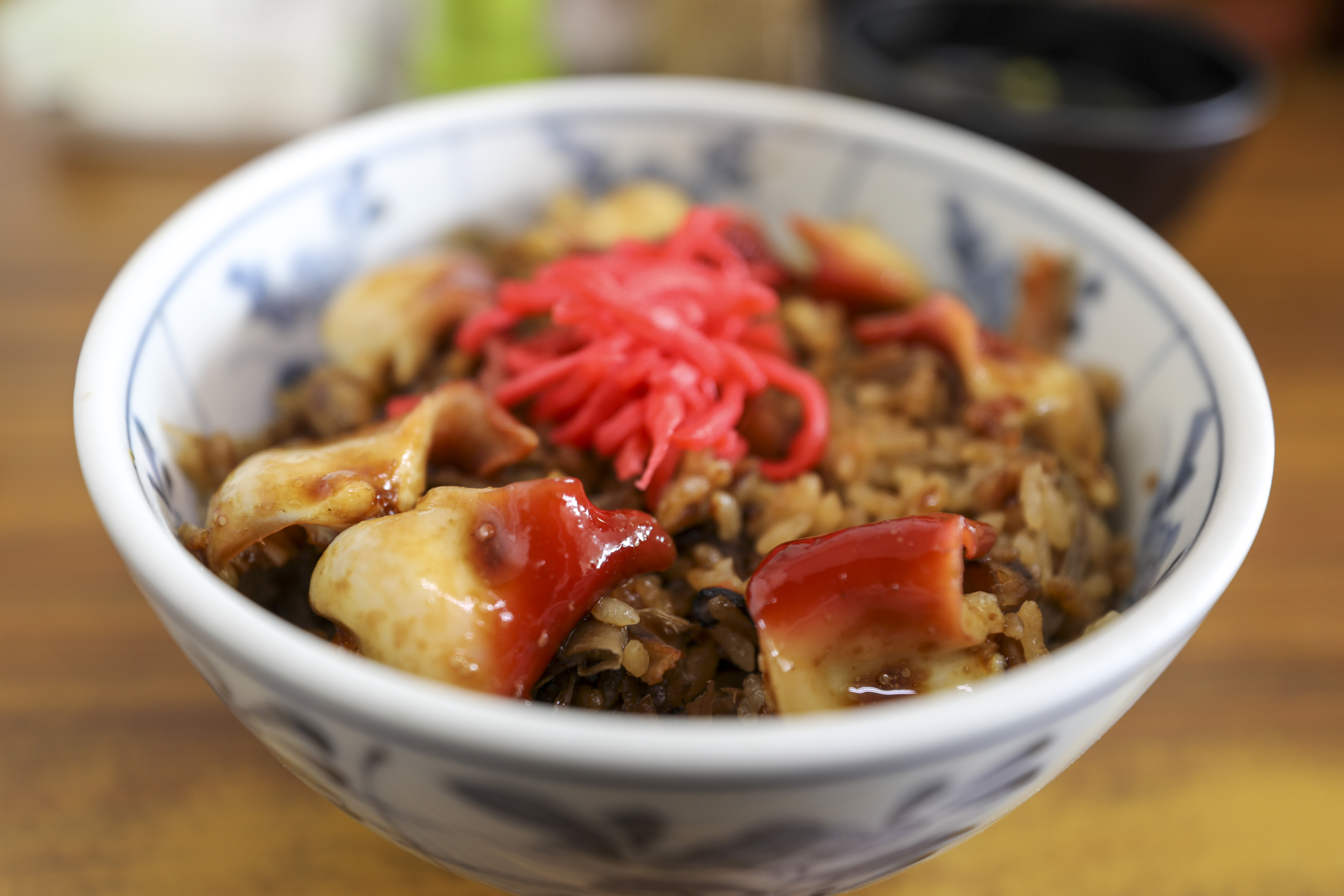
Rice with cooked surf clam
