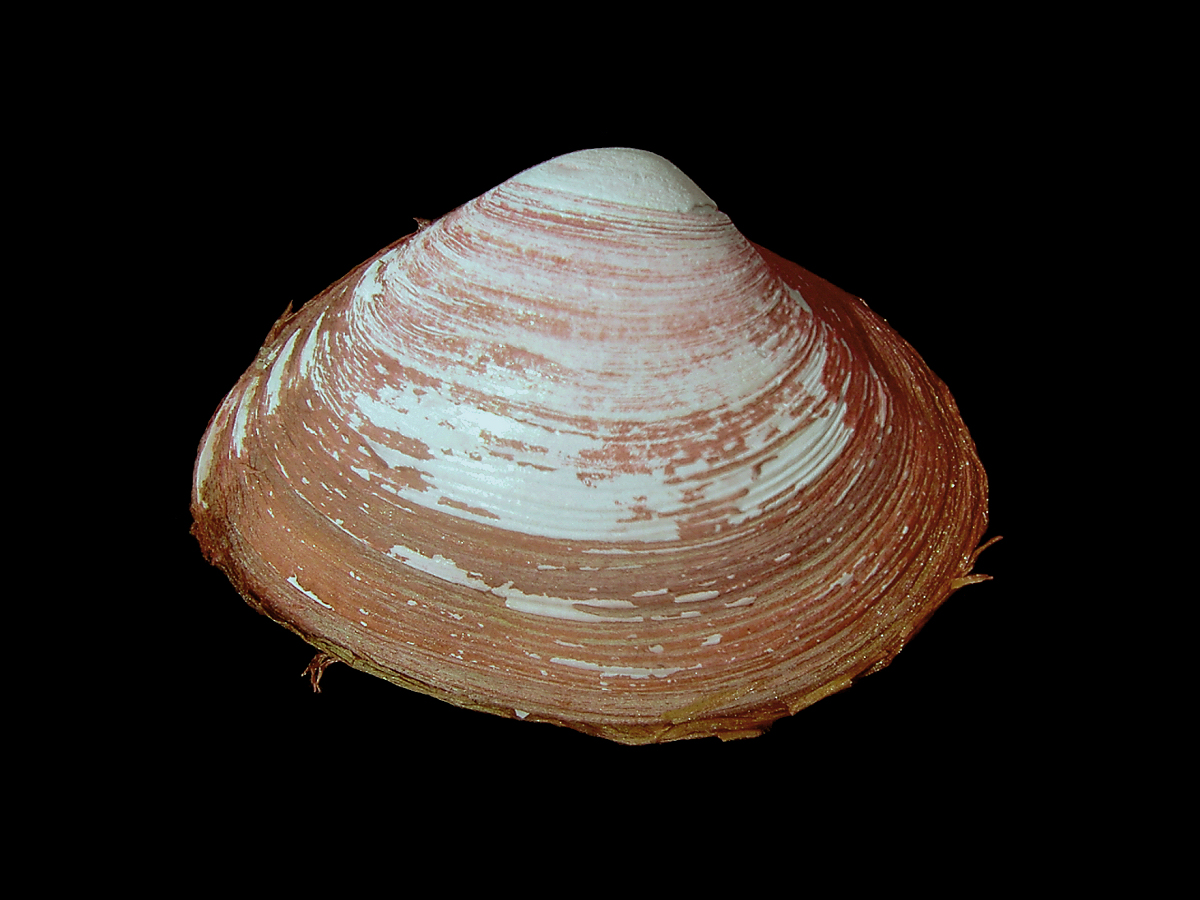
- External view of a shell of the Cut Trough Shell

Scientific classification
- Domain: Eukaryota
- Kingdom: Animalia
- Phylum: Mollusca
- Class: Bivalvia
- Order: Venerida
- Family: Mactridae
- Subfamily: Mactrinae
- Genus: Spisula
- Species: S. subtruncata

Binomial name
- Spisula subtruncata (da Costa, 1778)

Synonyms
- Trigonella subtruncata da Costa, 1778; Mactra subtruncata (da Costa, 1778); Mactra lactea Poli, 1791; Mactra triangula Brocchi, 1814; Spisula triangula (Brocchi, 1814); Mactra deltoides Lamarck, 1818; Mactra striata T. Brown, 1827; Mactra euxinica Krynicki, 1837

= Spisula subtruncata =

Cut Trough Shell

Species of mollusc

Spisula subtruncata, the Cut Trough Shell, is a medium-sized marine clam, or bivalve mollusc, found in the Eastern Atlantic from Iceland to Morocco and into the Mediterranean Sea. Common and sometimes very numerous. Up to 2.5 centimetres (0.98 in) long, with a distinct triangular shape. This species of clam is found in sandy and silty bottom in the sublittoral zone, where it lives as a sediment-burrowing filter feeder.

== Gallery ==
Spisula subtruncata

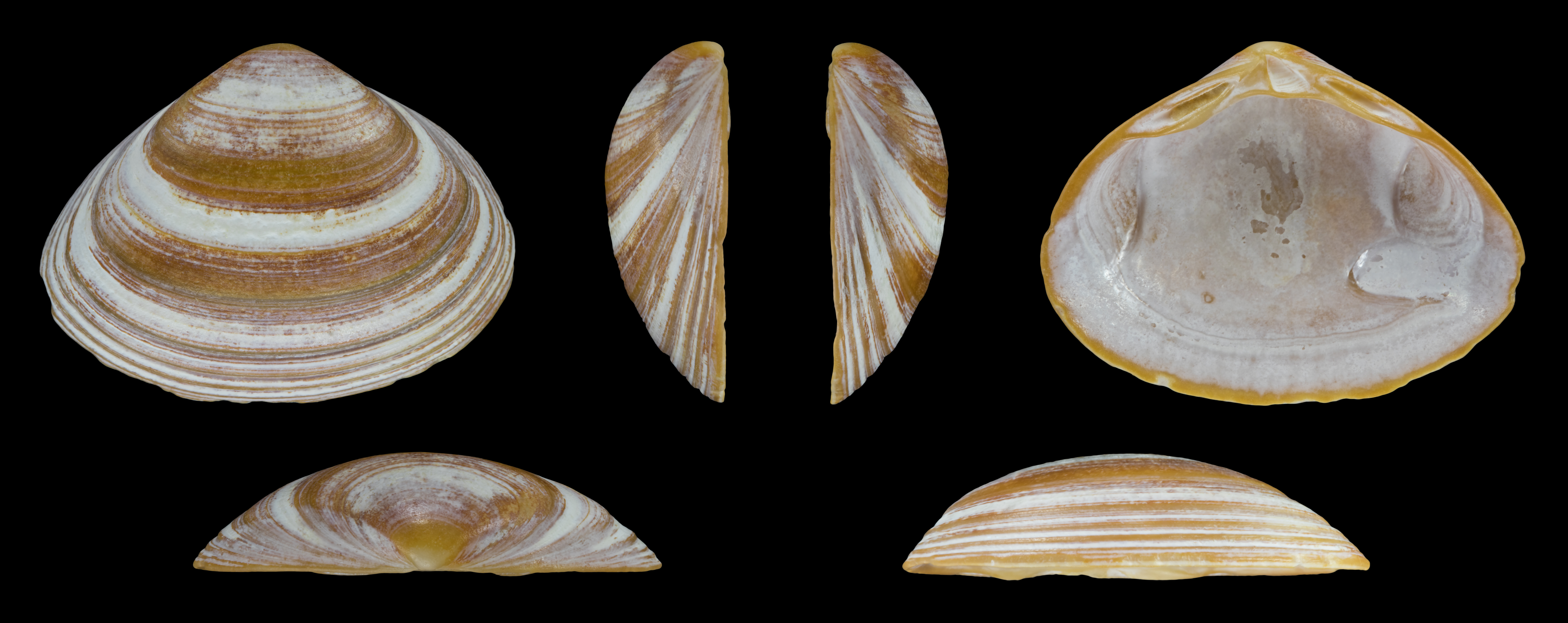
Brown form
Right valve

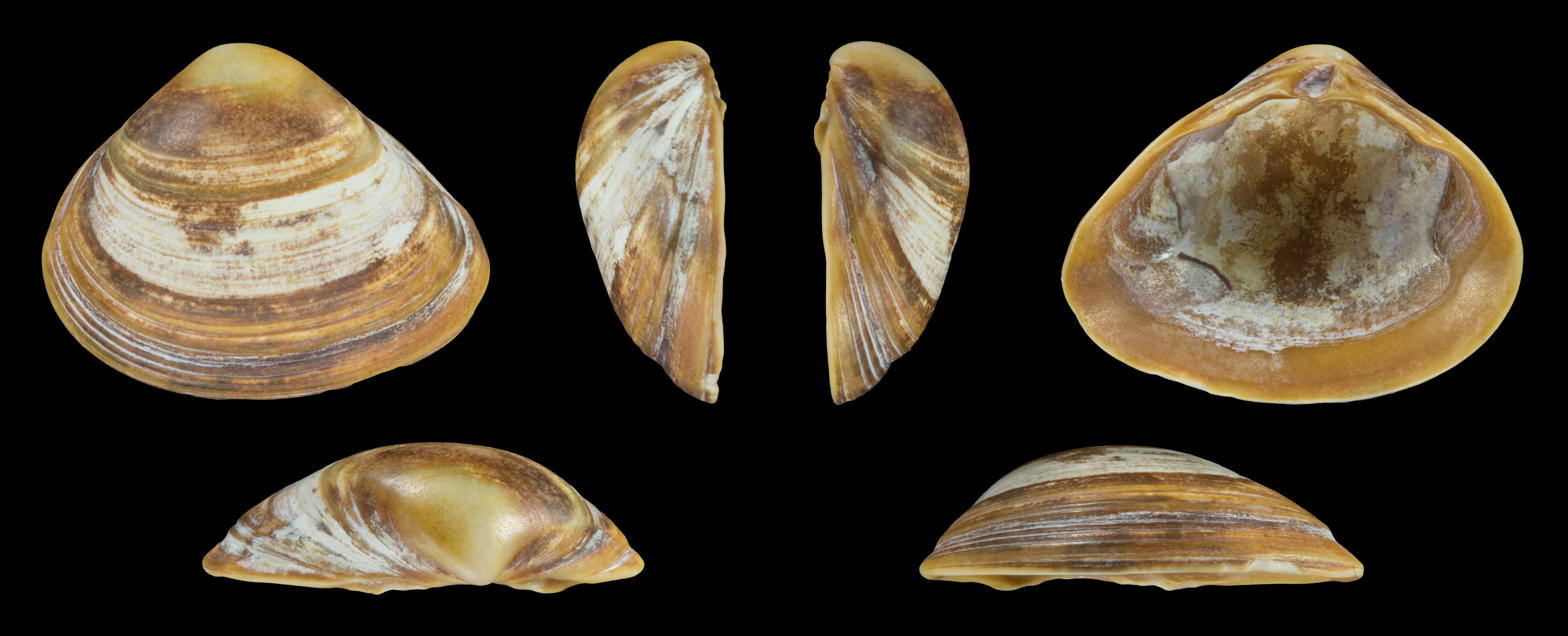
Brown form
Left valve

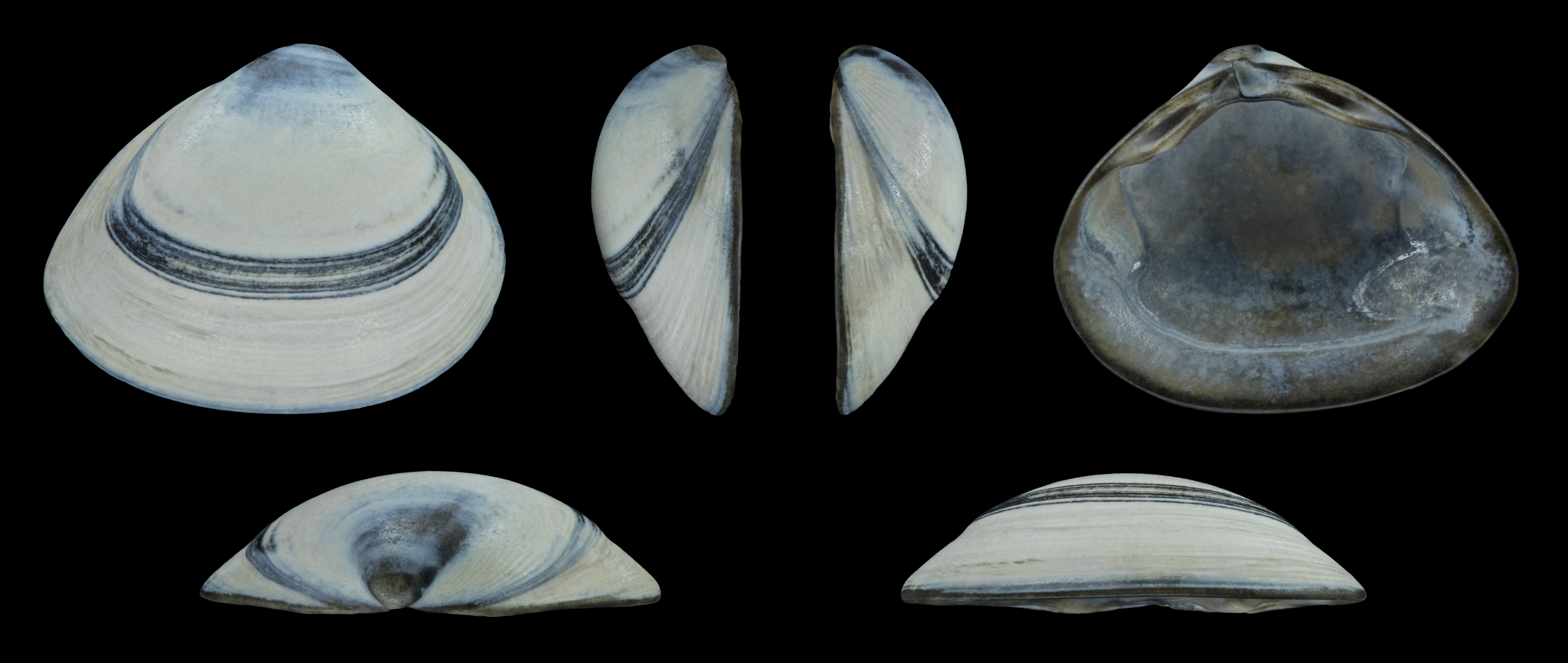
Grey form
Right valve

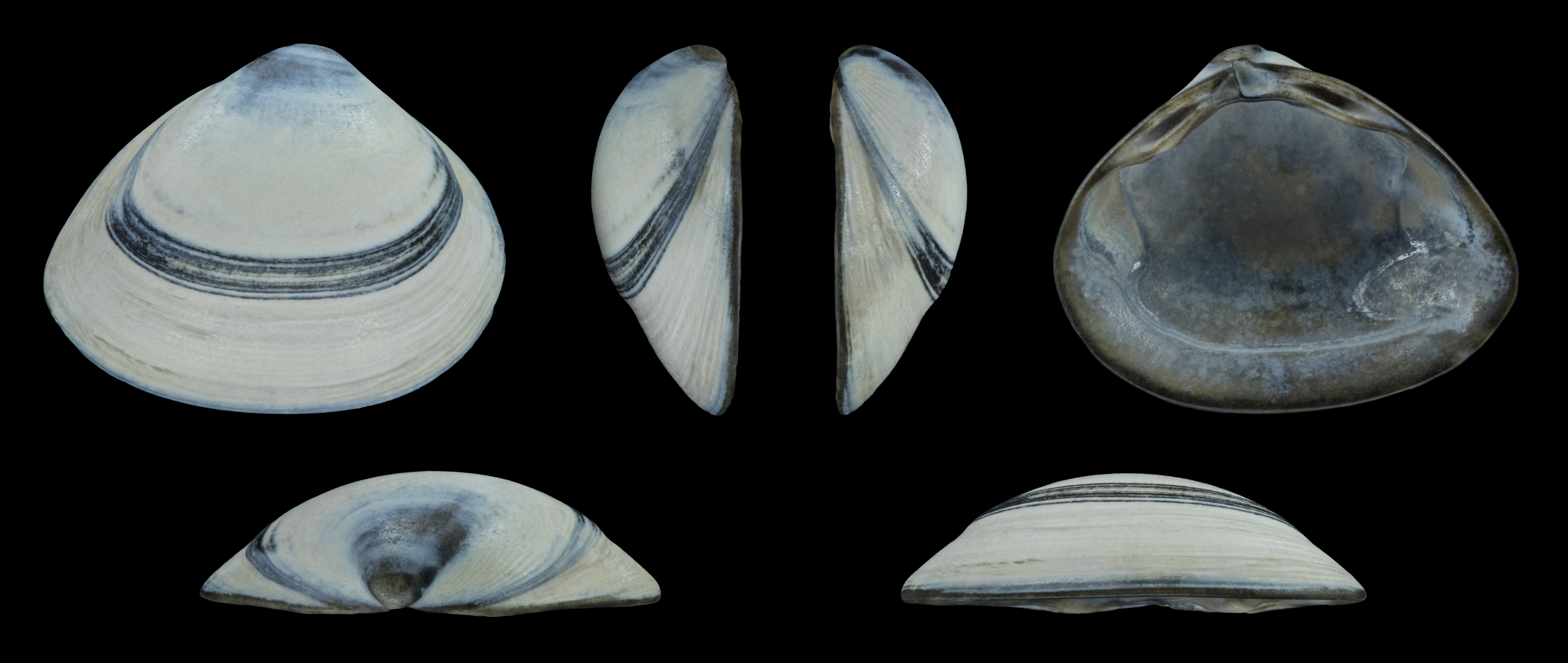
Grey form
Left valve

Spisula subtruncata var. triangula

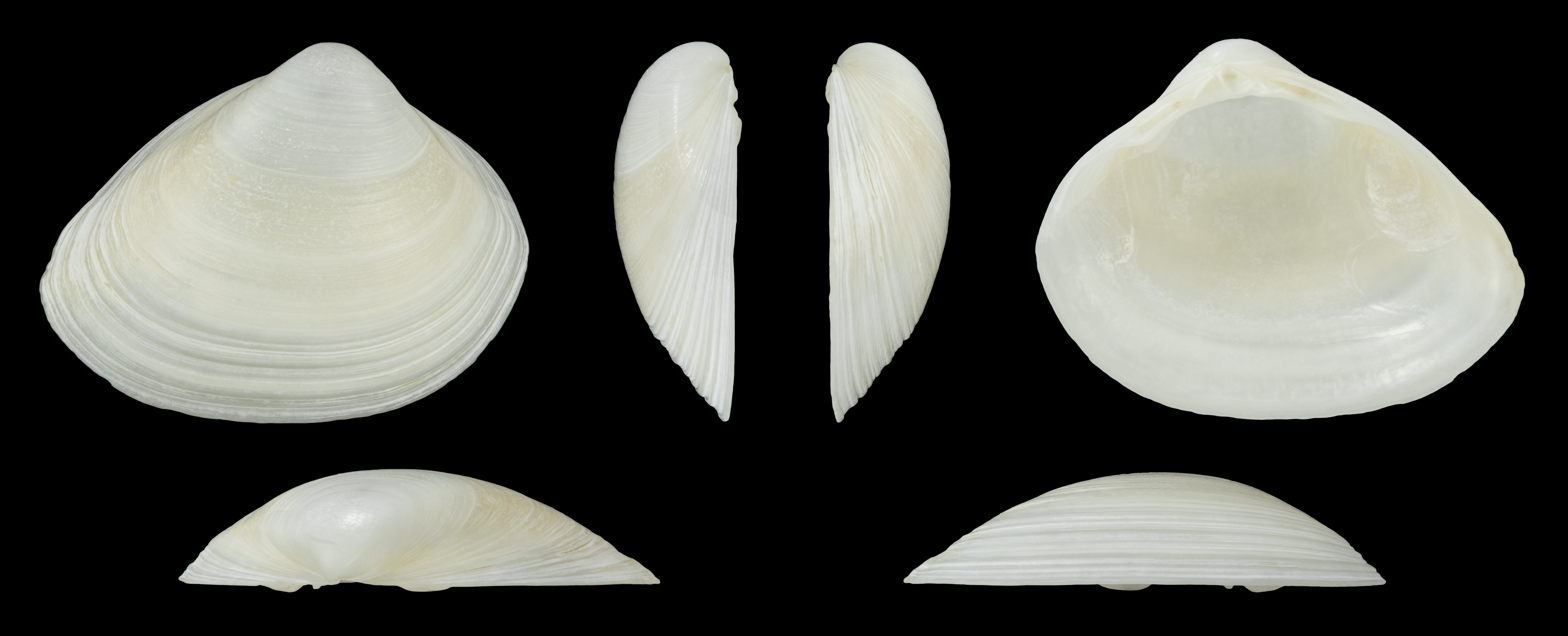
Right valve

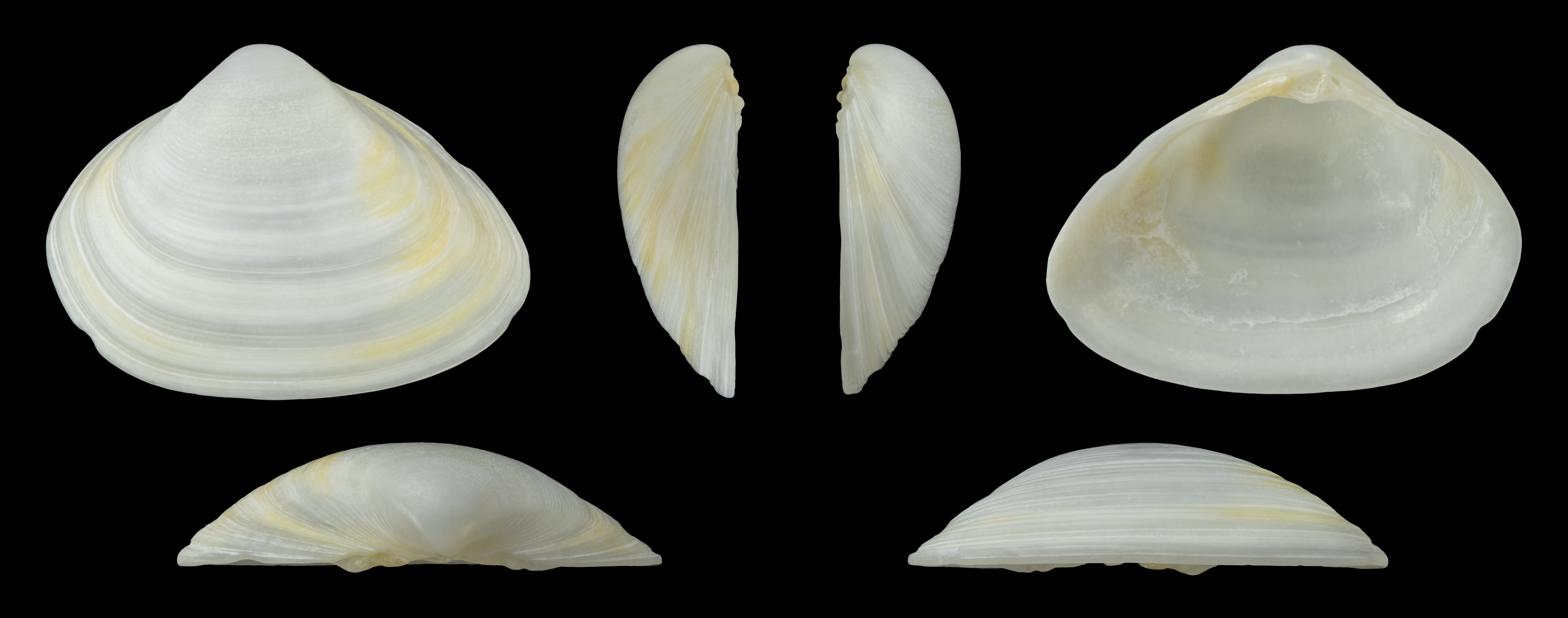
Left valve
