= Itoi Station =

Railway station in Tomakomai, Hokkaido, Japan

Coordinates: 42.6226°N 141.5464°E

H20 Itoi Station 糸井駅
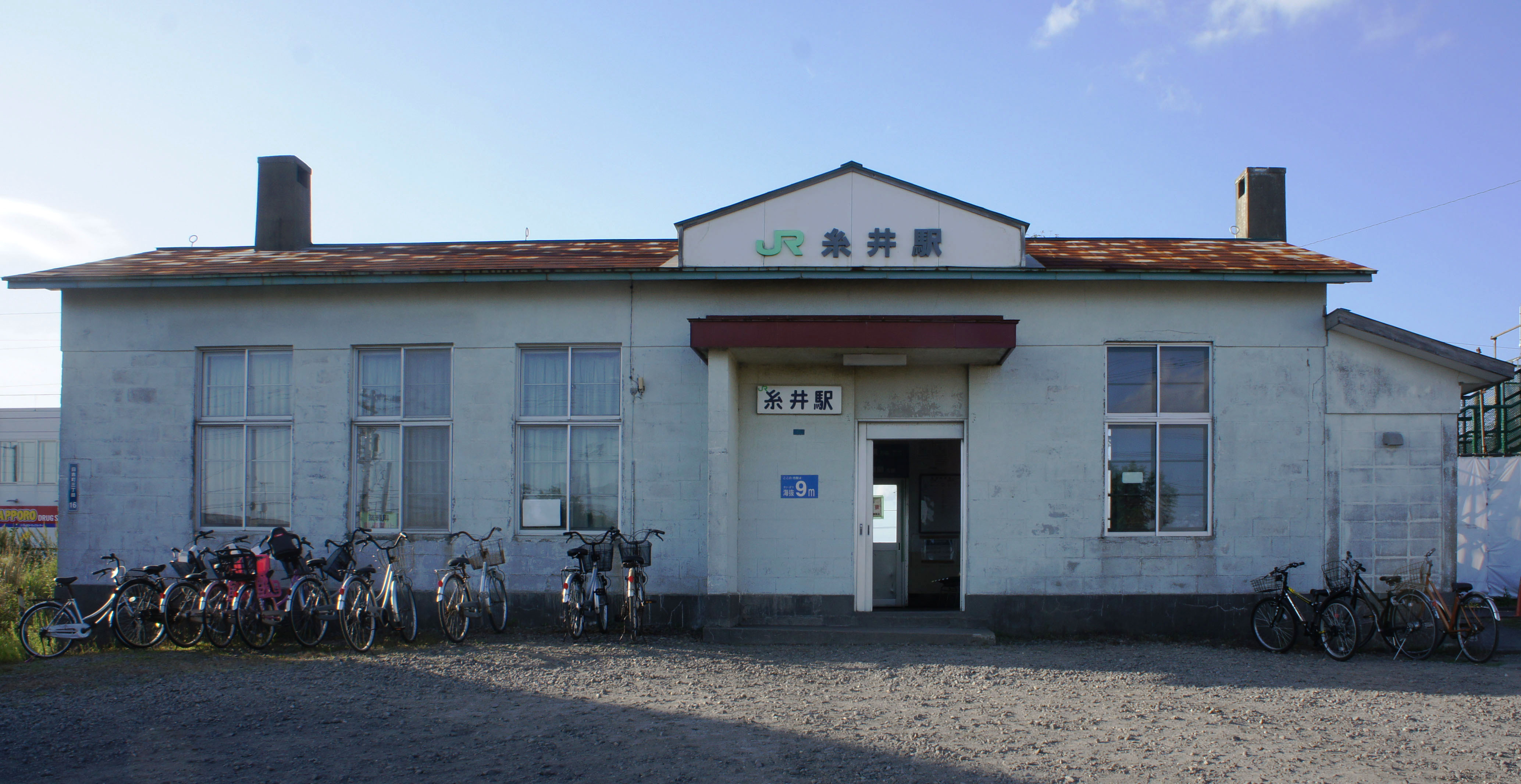

General information
- Location: 3 Hiyoshi-chō, Tomakomai, Hokkaido （苫小牧市日吉町3） Japan
- Operator: JR Hokkaido
- Line: Muroran Main Line
- Platforms: 2 side platforms
- Tracks: 2

Other information
- Station code: H20

Services
| Preceding station | JR Hokkaido | Following station |
|---|---|---|
| Nishikioka H21 towards Oshamambe | Muroran Main Line | Aoba H19 towards Iwamizawa |
Location
- Location within Hokkaido Location within Japan

Itoi Station (糸井駅, Itoi-eki) is a railway station on the Muroran Main Line in Tomakomai, Hokkaidō, Japan, operated by the Hokkaido Railway Company (JR Hokkaido). It is numbered "H20".

== Lines ==
Itoi Station is served by the Muroran Main Line.

== Station layout ==
The unstaffed station consists of two side platforms serving two tracks.

== Accidents ==
A 15-year-old junior high school student was killed at the station on 26 December 2011 after being hit by the non-stop Super Hokuto No. 9 limited express train service from Hakodate to Sapporo while crossing the tracks with a bicycle.

== Surrounding area ==
- National Route 36
- Shirakaba Onsen (hot spring)
