= Izushi-Itoi Prefectural Natural Park =

Natural park of Hyogo prefecture, Japan

- 出石糸井県立自然公園
- Location within Hyōgo Prefecture Location within Japan
- Location: Hyōgo Prefecture, Japan
- Coordinates: 35.39861°N 134.91008°E
- Area: 75.78 km^{2} (29.26 sq mi)
- Established: 30 March 1961

Izushi-Itoi Prefectural Natural Park (出石糸井県立自然公園, Izushi-Itoi kenritsu shizen kōen) is a Prefectural Natural Park in northeast Hyōgo Prefecture, Japan. Established in 1961, the park spans the municipalities of Asago and Toyooka.

== See also ==
- National Parks of Japan
