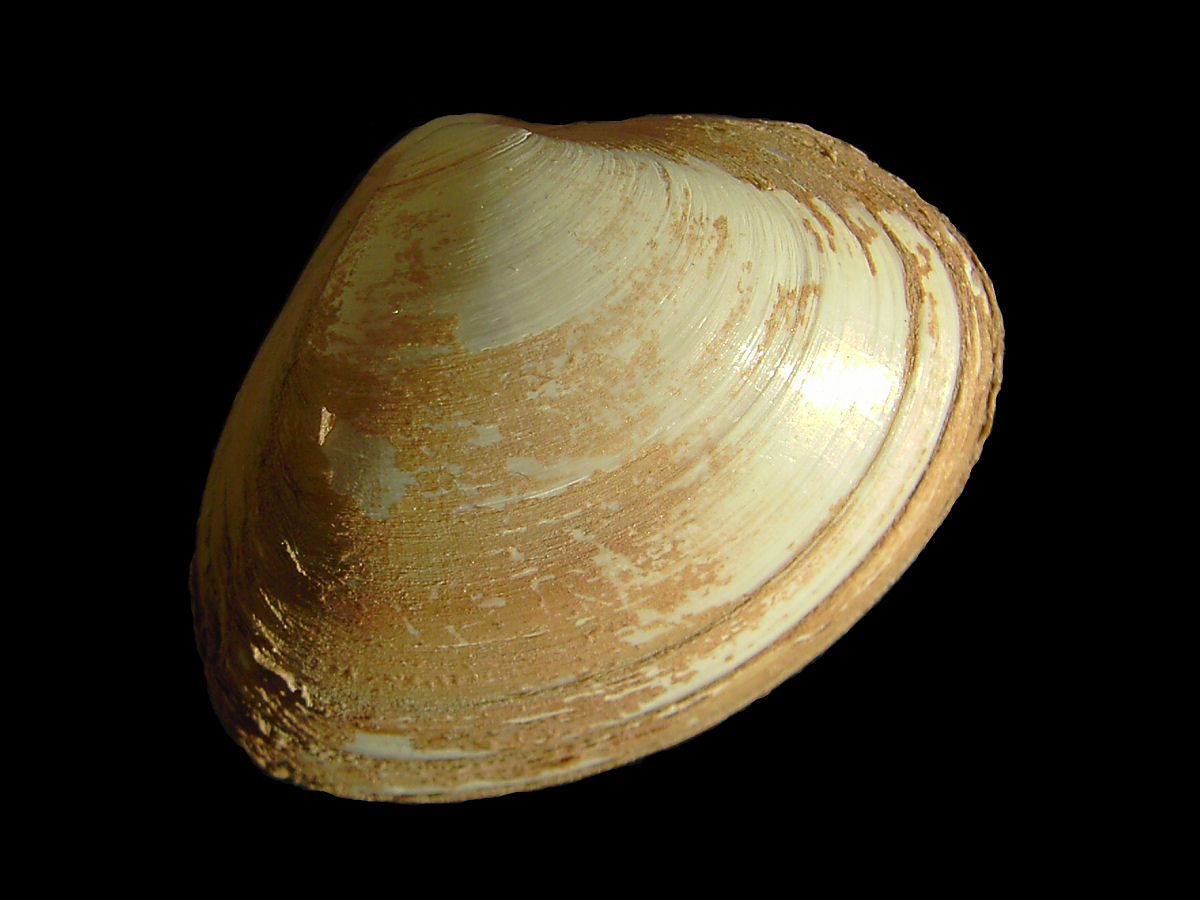
- External view of a shell of the surf clam

Scientific classification
- Kingdom: Animalia
- Phylum: Mollusca
- Class: Bivalvia
- Order: Venerida
- Family: Mactridae
- Subfamily: Mactrinae
- Genus: Spisula
- Species: S. solida

Binomial name
- Spisula solida (Linnaeus, 1758)

Synonyms
- Cardium solidum Linnaeus, 1758; Cardium triste Linnaeus, 1758; Cyrena panormitana Bivona, 1839; Mactra castanea Lamarck, 1818; Mactra crassatella Lamarck, 1818; Mactra gallina Spengler, 1802; Mactra ovalis J. Sowerby, 1817; Mactra solida (Linnaeus, 1758); Mactra striata Nyst, 1845; Mactra truncata Montagu, 1808; Spisula ovalis (J. Sowerby, 1817); Trigonella gallina da Costa, 1778; Trigonella zonaria da Costa, 1778

= Spisula solida =

Surf clam

Species of mollusc

The surf clam (Spisula solida) is a medium-sized marine clam, or bivalve mollusc, found in the Eastern Atlantic from Iceland and northern Norway to Portugal and Spain. Up to 5 centimetres (2.0 in) long, like many clams, the surf clam is a sediment-burrowing filter feeder.

Right and left valve of the same specimen:

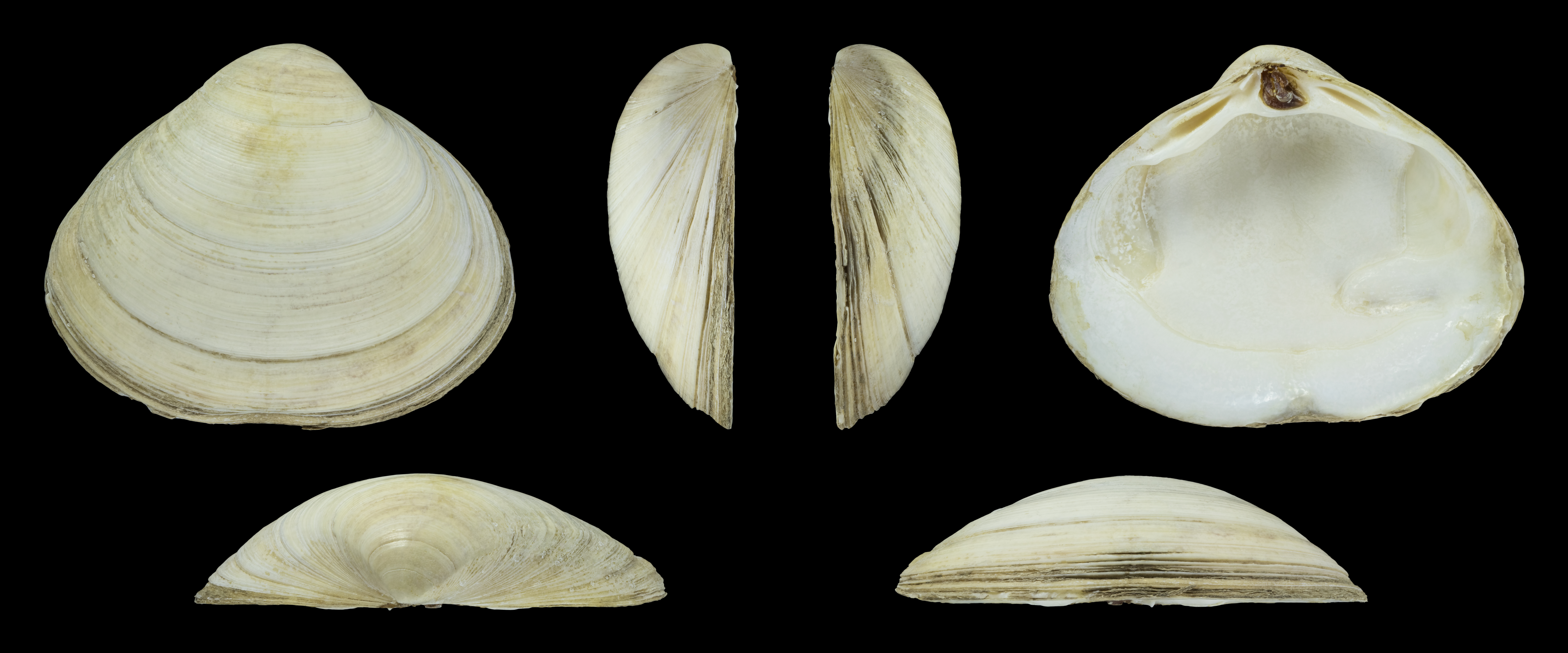
Right valve

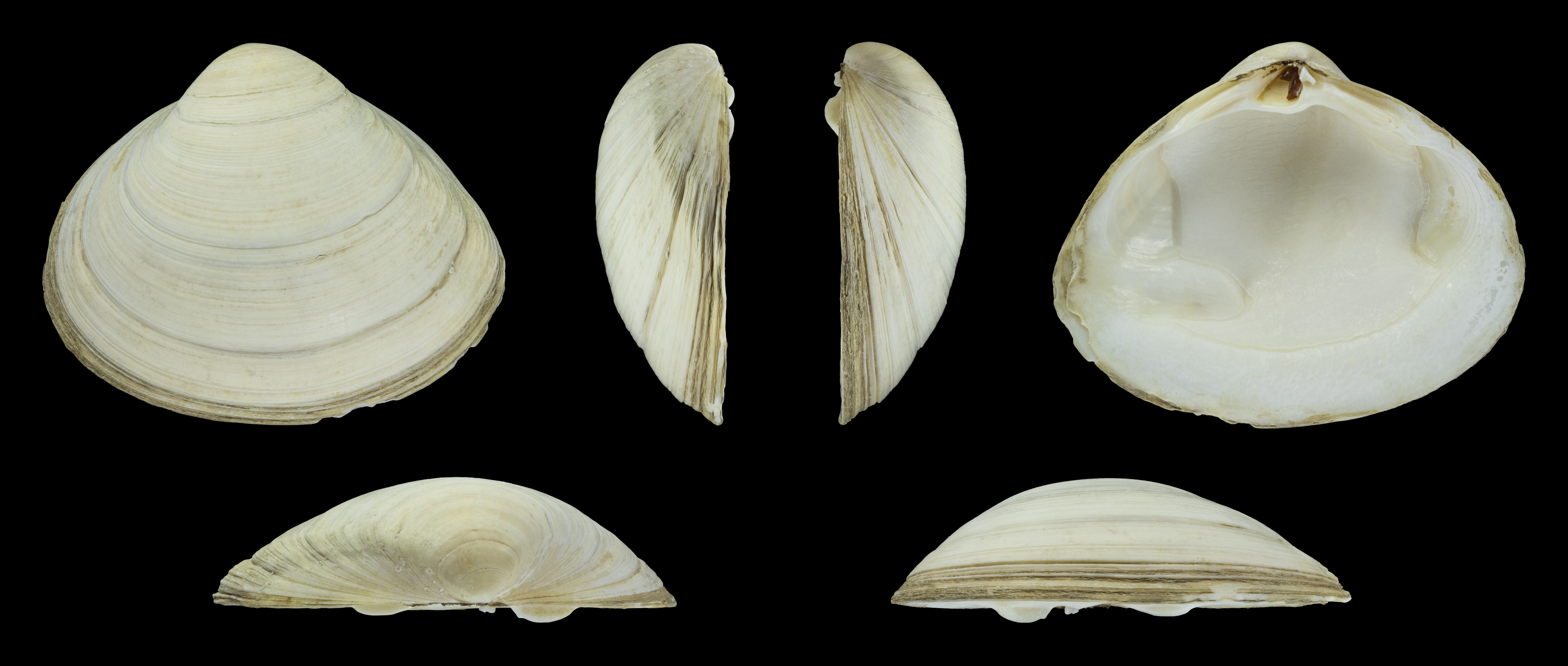
Left valve

This species of clam is found in sandy bottom in the sublittoral zone. It is commonly found in the North Sea, Baltic Sea and the Irish Sea.
