= Itoi (Hitui) =

Itoi Hitui
- village
- Location in Andaman and Nicobar Islands, India Itoi (India)
- Coordinates: 7.992840°N 93.532164°E
- Country: India
- State: Andaman and Nicobar Islands
- District: Nicobar
- Tehsil: Nancowry

Population (2011)
  - Total: 181
- Time zone: UTC+5:30 (IST)
- Census code: 645100

Itoi is a village in the Nicobar district of Andaman and Nicobar Islands, India. It is located in the Nancowry tehsil.

== Demographics ==
According to the 2011 census of India, Itoi has 41 households. The effective literacy rate (i.e. the literacy rate of population excluding children aged 6 and below) is 72.92%.

Demographics (2011 Census)
	Total	Male	Female
Population	181	109	72
Children aged below 6 years	37	25	12
Scheduled caste	0	0	0
Scheduled tribe	179	108	71
Literates	105	67	38
Workers (all)	78	50	28
Main workers (total)	10	7	3
Main workers: Cultivators	0	0	0
Main workers: Agricultural labourers	0	0	0
Main workers: Household industry workers	0	0	0
Main workers: Other	10	7	3
Marginal workers (total)	68	43	25
Marginal workers: Cultivators	0	0	0
Marginal workers: Agricultural labourers	0	0	0
Marginal workers: Household industry workers	0	0	0
Marginal workers: Others	68	43	25
Non-workers	103	59	44
