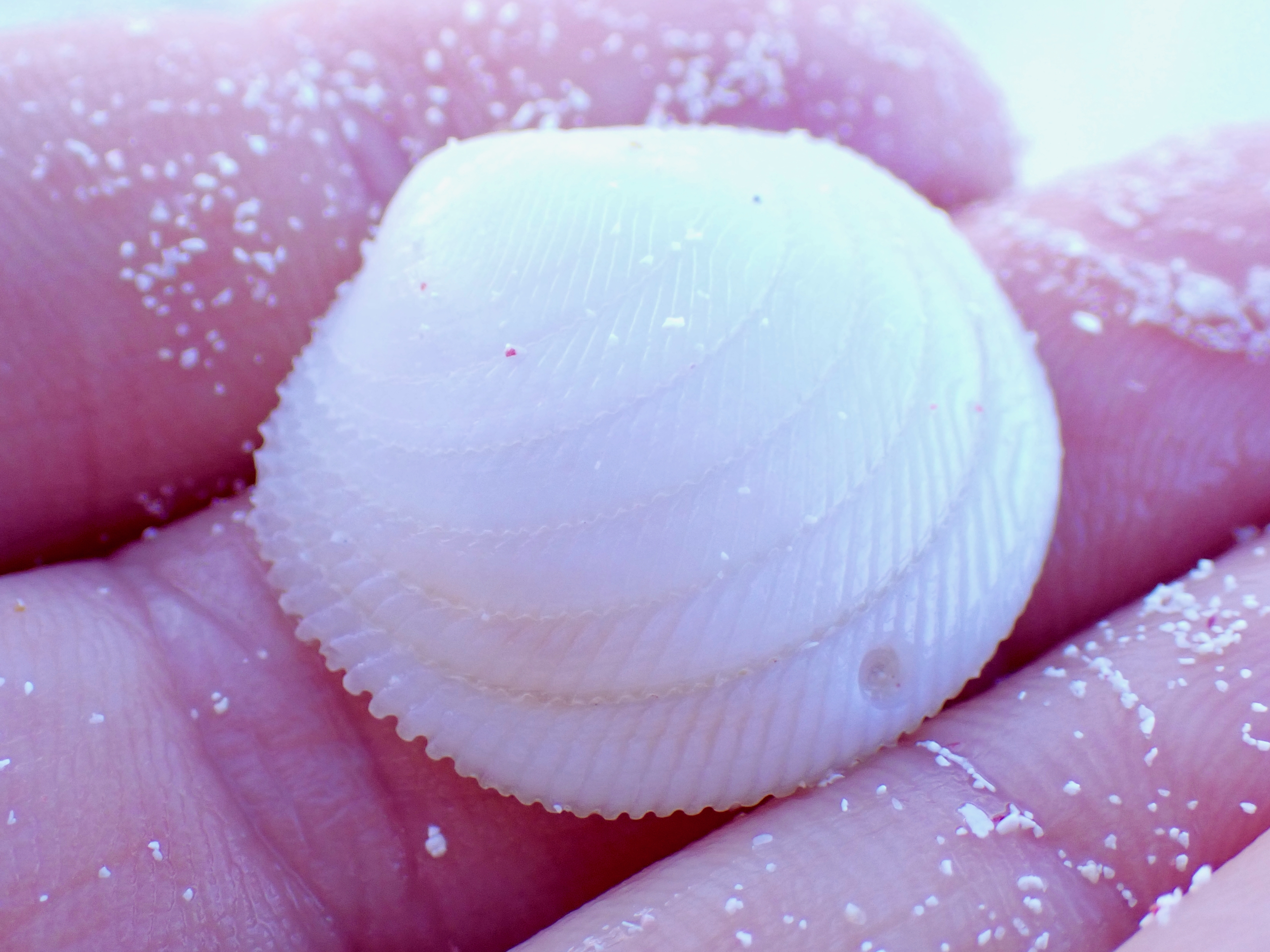
- Shell collected near Spanish Wells, The Bahamas

Scientific classification
- Kingdom: Animalia
- Phylum: Mollusca
- Class: Bivalvia
- Order: Lucinida
- Superfamily: Lucinoidea
- Family: Lucinidae
- Genus: Divaricella
- Species: D. dentata

Binomial name
- Divaricella dentata (Wood, 1815)

= Divaricella dentata =

Species of bivalve

Divaricella dentata, or the dentate lucine, is a species of bivalve mollusc in the family Lucinidae. It can be found along the coast of the West Indies. It is notable for its shell pattern.
