= Divaricella quadrisulcata =

Scientific classification
- Kingdom: Animalia
- Phylum: Mollusca
- Class: Bivalvia
- Order: Lucinida
- Superfamily: Lucinoidea
- Family: Lucinidae
- Genus: Divaricella
- Species: D. quadrisulcata

Binomial name
- Divaricella quadrisulcata (Orbigny, 1842)

Species of bivalve

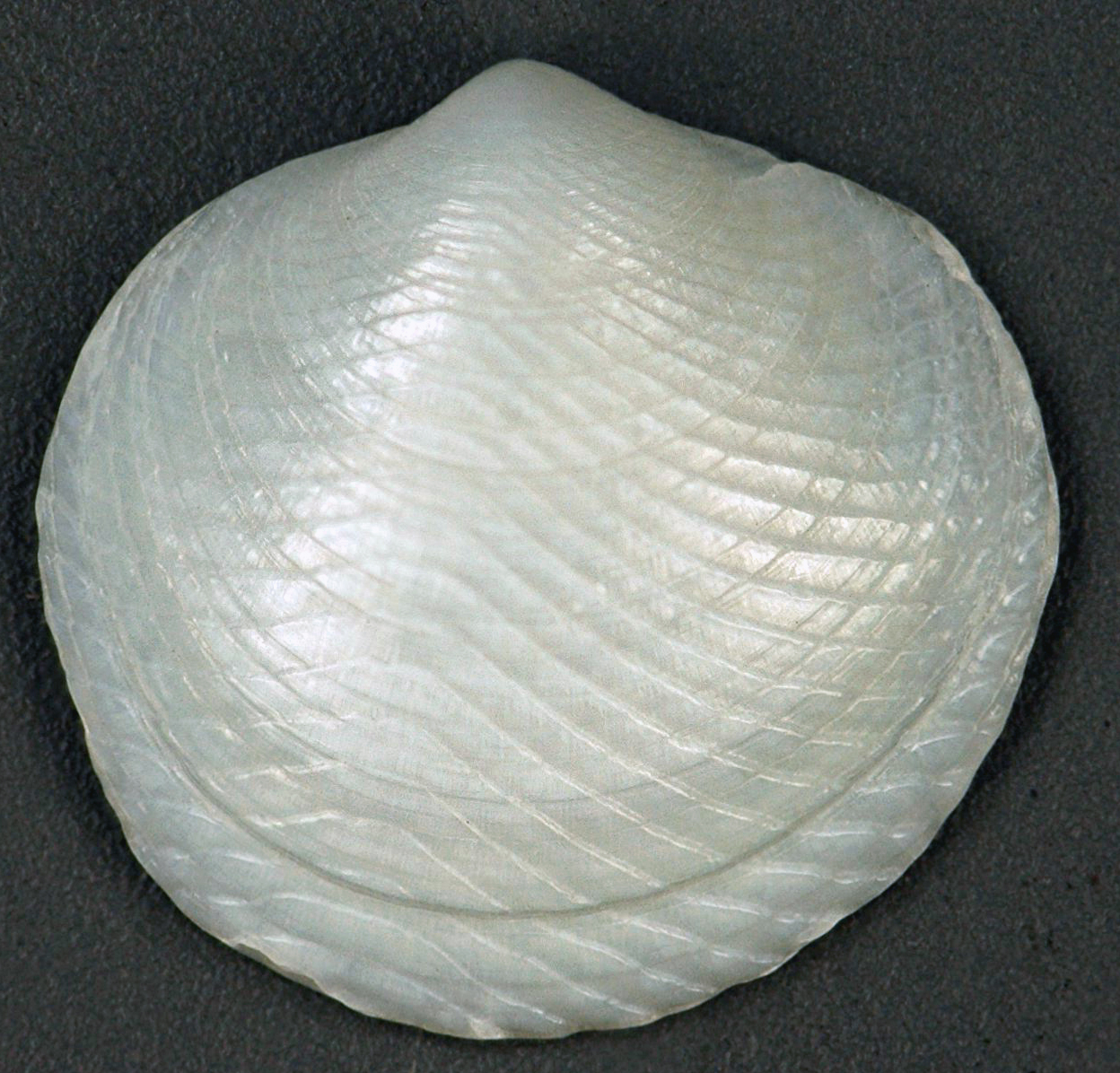
Growth patterns and concentric ridges on Divalinga quadrisulcata shell

Divaricella quadrisulcata, or the cross-hatched lucine, is a species of marine bivalve mollusc in the family Lucinidae. D. quadrisulcata, also known as Divalinga quadrisulcata, are known for their unique shell patterns. The shells of D. quadrisulcata have been used as jewelry and can be collected along the shore in many Atlantic coastal states in North America. These organisms are known to have a symbiotic relationship with sulfur-oxidizing bacteria, as is characteristic of many other organisms within the family Lucinidae.

== Form and Function ==
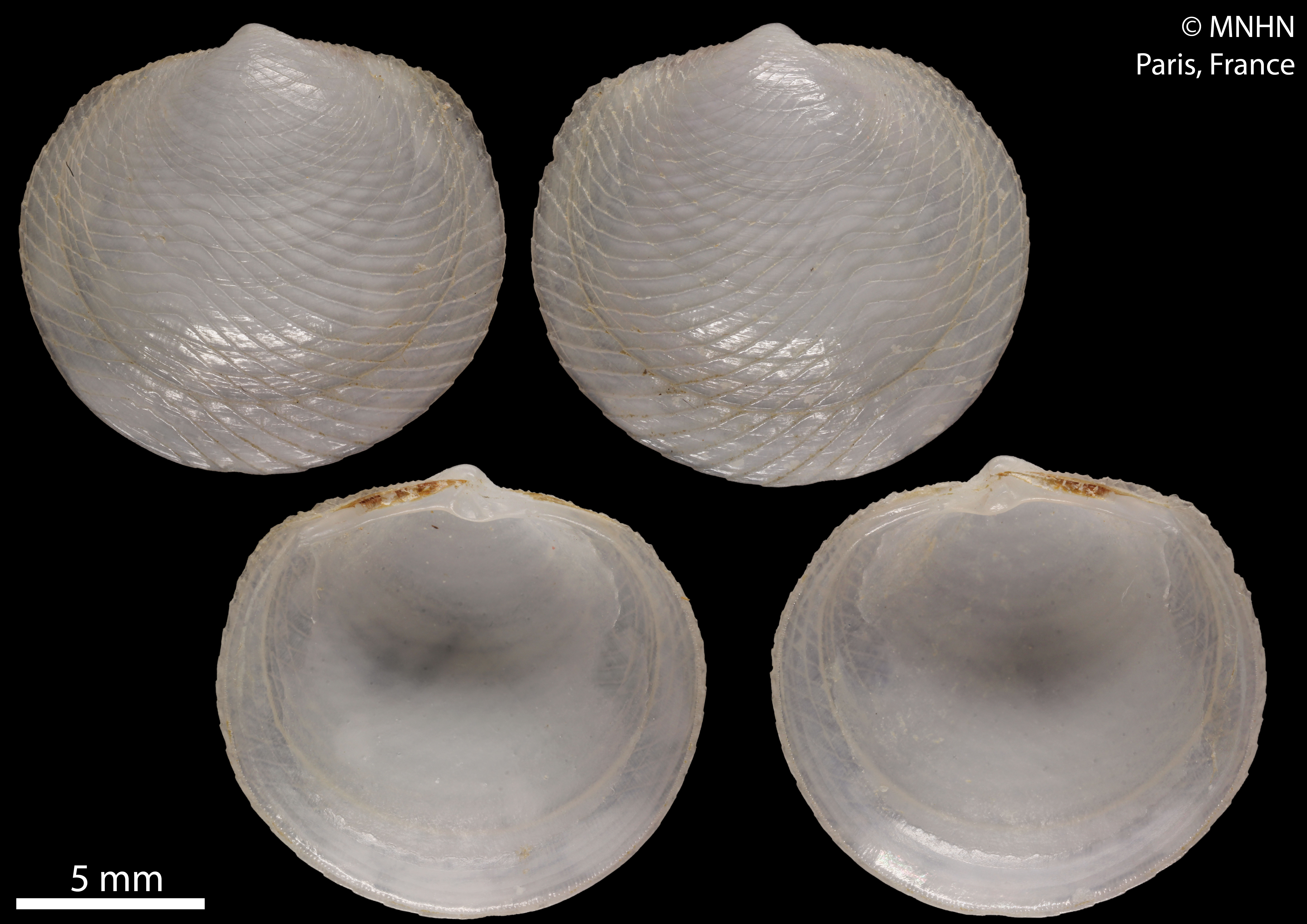
The outer surface of the Divalinga quadrisulcata shell in comparison to the inner surface of the shell.

=== Anatomy ===
D. quadrisulcata belongs to the family Lucinidae. Lucinidae are known for their round, white shells. These shells are thick and often spherical-shaped. Members of the Lucinidae family often have concentric ridges that run parallel to the growth patterns of the shell. D. quadrisulcata are unique among the Lucinidae in that the concentric ridges on their shells are not parallel with growth patterns. Rather, the ridges on D. quadrisulcata shells grow at a 45° angle in comparison with growth patterns.

Because D. quadrisulcata are a species of bivalve mollusc, they have two halves of a shell. These two halves are connected by a hinge that is located on the dorsal side of the mollusc. These organisms, like all bivalves, also have a mantle, a style, gills, two adductor muscles, a digestive tract, gonads, and a foot for movement.

=== Feeding and Digestion ===
The mantle is an organ that covers most of the body of D. quadrisulcata. This tissue helps not only with the formation of the shell and hinge, but also with the production of siphons for the inflow and outflow of water. When water flows through the inflow siphon, also known as the inhalent siphon, it passes through the gills on its way out through the outflow siphon, also known as the exhalent siphon. The gills of the D. quadrisulcata capture pieces of organic matter in that water and sends the matter to the style. The organic matter can then get trapped by mucus in the style of the mollusc.

The digestive tract consists of an esophagus, a stomach, and a mid-gut. The short esophagus moves food from the gills to the stomach through the cilia lining its walls. Within the stomach, a crystalline structure called the style helps to capture the food and move it farther into the digestive tract. The style uses mucus to capture the food, and, through ciliary action, helps to move food throughout the stomach. The stomach is also aided in the process of digestion by glands called digestive diverticula. These glands contain enzymes that help to break down the organic matter trapped in the style. The next portion of the digestive tract is the mid-gut, also known as the intestine. Unlike other members of the family Lucinidae, the mid-gut of D. quadrisulcata has a large typhlosole—a fold in the membrane. This fold, located on the dorsal side of the organism, is indicative of an active digestive system. Lastly, waste from the digestive system is excreted from the body after passing through the rectum.

=== Movement ===
The foot of the D. quadrisulcata is the organ used for movement. This structure consists of a long, worm-shaped tissue (also known as vermiform), a tissue called the heel, and a distinct bulb-shaped end. The heel of the organism is often used for movement and digging, and the worm-shaped part of the foot is used to form a tube that extends to the surface. This tube is the buried organism’s way of exchanging gas with the water above. To reach the surface, as well as to help extend the heel when burrowing, the worm-shaped part of the foot can stretch up to six times the length of the D. quadrisulcata shell.

== Distribution ==
Found along the Atlantic coast of North America, ranging from Massachusetts to the West Indies.

== Habitat ==
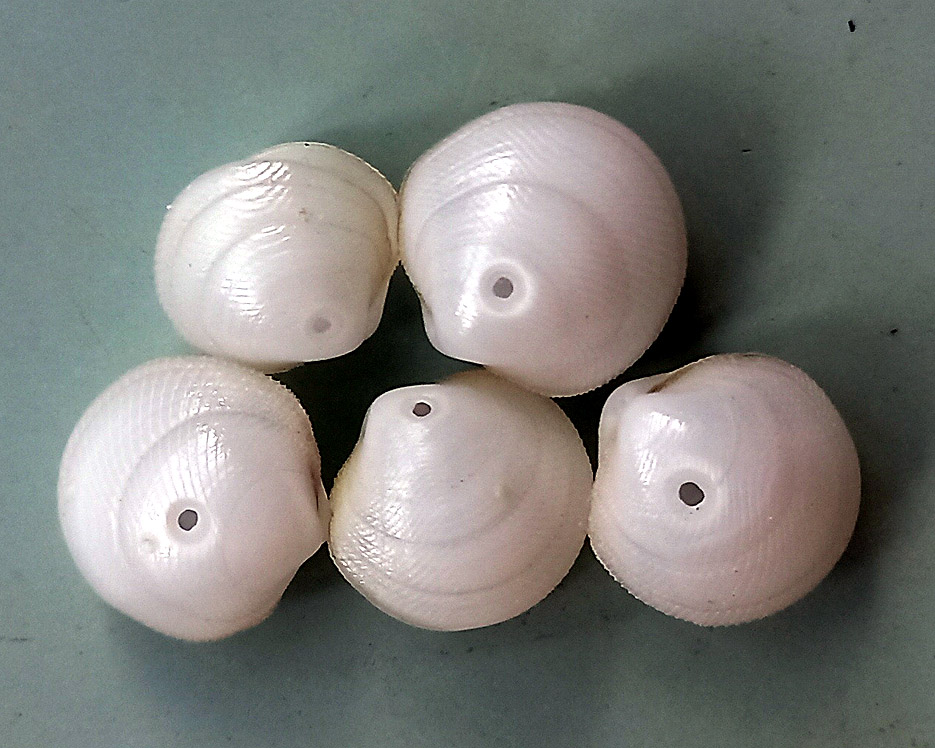
Divaricella quadrisulcata showing Naticid predation holes

Divaricella quadrisulcata are often found in large sandy areas that seem to have a lack of other animals present. The D. quadrisulcata organisms can be found in shallow water and are known to live near the Thalassia plant. These bivalves are known to bury themselves within the sand, often by burrowing straight down. Other species that are often found in the same area are Codakia orbiculata and Lucina pennsylvanica. D. quadrisulcata are found in sandy, shallow areas, often providing a food source for Naticidae moon snails. D. quadrisulcata are also parasitized by a species called Myocheres Inflata (Allen, 1956). The M. inflata, a cyclopoid copepod, lives in the mantle cavity of the D. quadrisulcata and can be found in the Bahamas.
