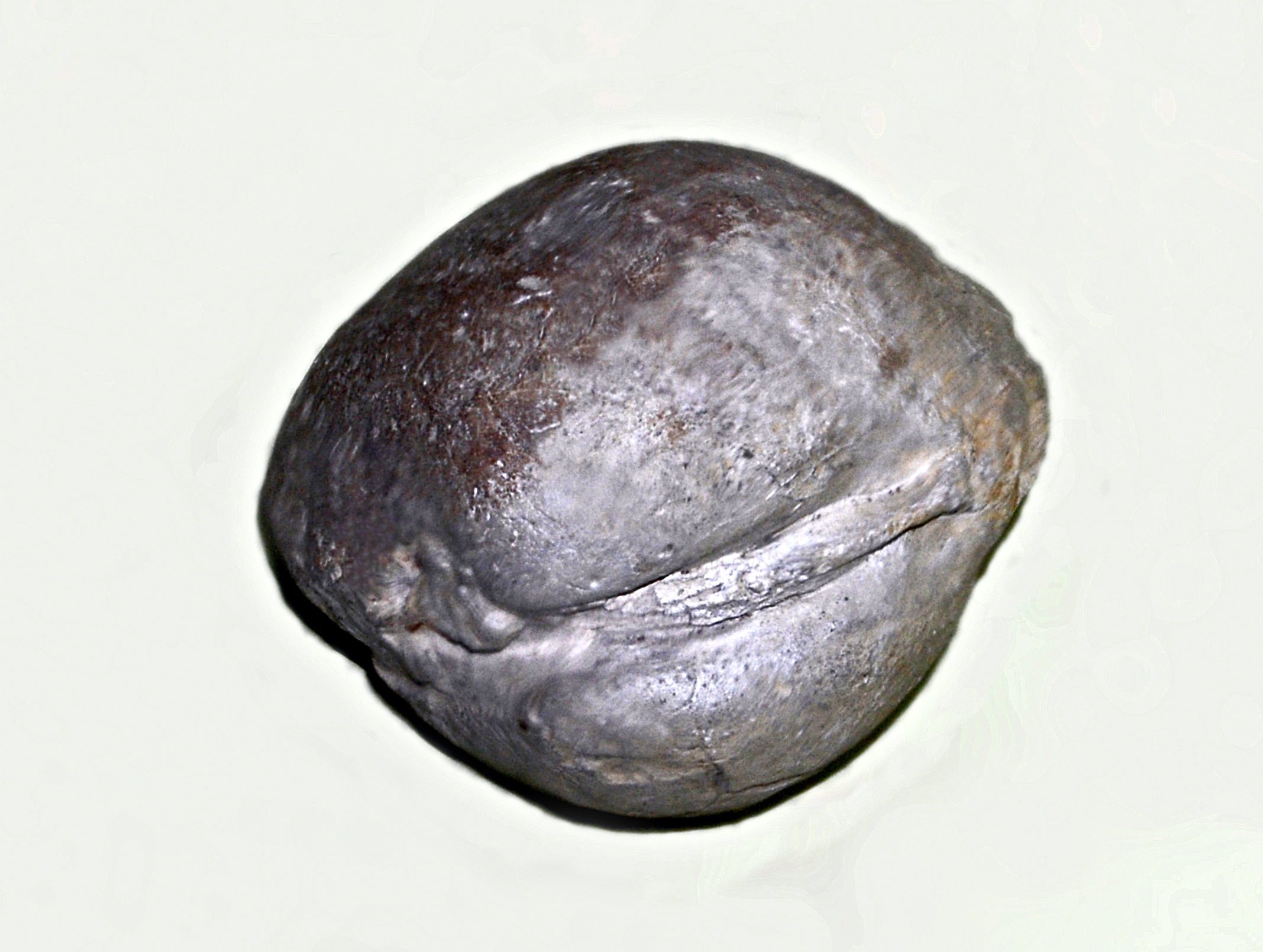
- Fossil of Lucina species from Miocene of Italy

Scientific classification
- Domain: Eukaryota
- Kingdom: Animalia
- Phylum: Mollusca
- Class: Bivalvia
- Order: Lucinida
- Family: Lucinidae
- Genus: Lucina; Bruguière, 1797

Type species
- Venus pensylvanica Linnaeus, 1758

Species
- See text

Synonyms
- Egraca Leach, 1852; Linga de Gregorio, 1885; Lucina (Linga) de Gregorio, 1885 (original rank); Lucina (Lucina) Bruguière, 1797

= Lucina (bivalve) =

Lucina Temporal range: Devonian – Present, 388.1–0 Ma

Genus of molluscs

Lucina is a genus of saltwater clams, marine bivalve molluscs.

These bivalves are remarkable for their endosymbiosis with sulphide-oxidizing bacteria.

== Fossil record ==
Fossils of Lucina are found in marine strata from the Devonian until the Quaternary (age range: from 388.1 to 0.012 million years ago).

== Selected species ==
- Lucina adansoni d'Orbigny, 1840
- Lucina aurantia Deshayes, 1832
- Lucina carnosa Dunker, 1865
- † Lucina columbella Lamarck, 1818
- † Lucina orbicularis Deshayes, 1835
- Lucina pensylvanica (Linnaeus, 1758) – Pennsylvania lucine
- † Lucina podagrina (Dall, 1903)
- Lucina roquesana J. Gibson-Smith & W. Gibson-Smith, 1982
- Lucina roscoeorum (Kilburn, 1974)

Species brought into synonymy

- Lucina amiantus (Dall, 1901) – decorated lucine : synonym of Radiolucina amianta (Dall, 1901) (incorrect gender ending)
- Lucina bermudensis Dall, 1901: synonym of † Lucinoma bermudensis (Dall, 1901)
- Lucina excavata Carpenter, 1857: synonym of Here excavata (Carpenter, 1857)
- Lucina fenestrata Hinds, 1845: synonym of Lucinisca fenestrata (Hinds, 1845)
- Lucina floridana Conrad, 1833, now Stewartia floridana: synonym of Stewartia floridana (Conrad, 1833)
- Lucina keenae Chavan, 1971: synonym of Callucina keenae (Chavan, 1971)
- Lucina leucocyma Dall, 1886: synonym of Pleurolucina leucocyma (Dall, 1886)
- Lucina nuttalli (Conrad, 1791): synonym of Lucinisca nuttalli (Conrad, 1837)
- Lucina sombrerensis Dall, 1886: synonym of Pleurolucina sombrerensis (Dall, 1886)
- † Lucina trisulcata Conrad, 1841: synonym of † Cavilinga trisulcata (Conrad, 1841)

== Characteristics ==
The members of the genus Lucina, as other members of the family Lucinidae, are found in muddy sand or gravel at or below low tide mark. They have characteristically rounded shells with forward-facing projections. The valves are flattened and etched with concentric rings. Each valve bears two cardinal and two plate-like lateral teeth. These molluscs do not have siphons but the extremely long foot makes a channel which is then lined with slime and serves for the intake and expulsion of water.

- Lucina leucocyma Dall, 1886 – four-ribbed lucine: synonym of Pleurolucina leucocyma (Dall, 1886)
- Lucina muricata (Spengler, 1798): synonym of Lucinisca centrifuga (Dall, 1901)
- Lucina nassula (Conrad, 1846): synonym of Lucinisca nassula (Conrad, 1846)
- Lucina pectinata (Gmelin, 1791): synonym of Phacoides pectinatus (Gmelin, 1791)
- Lucina radians (Conrad, 1841): synonym of Callucina keenae (Chavan, 1971)
