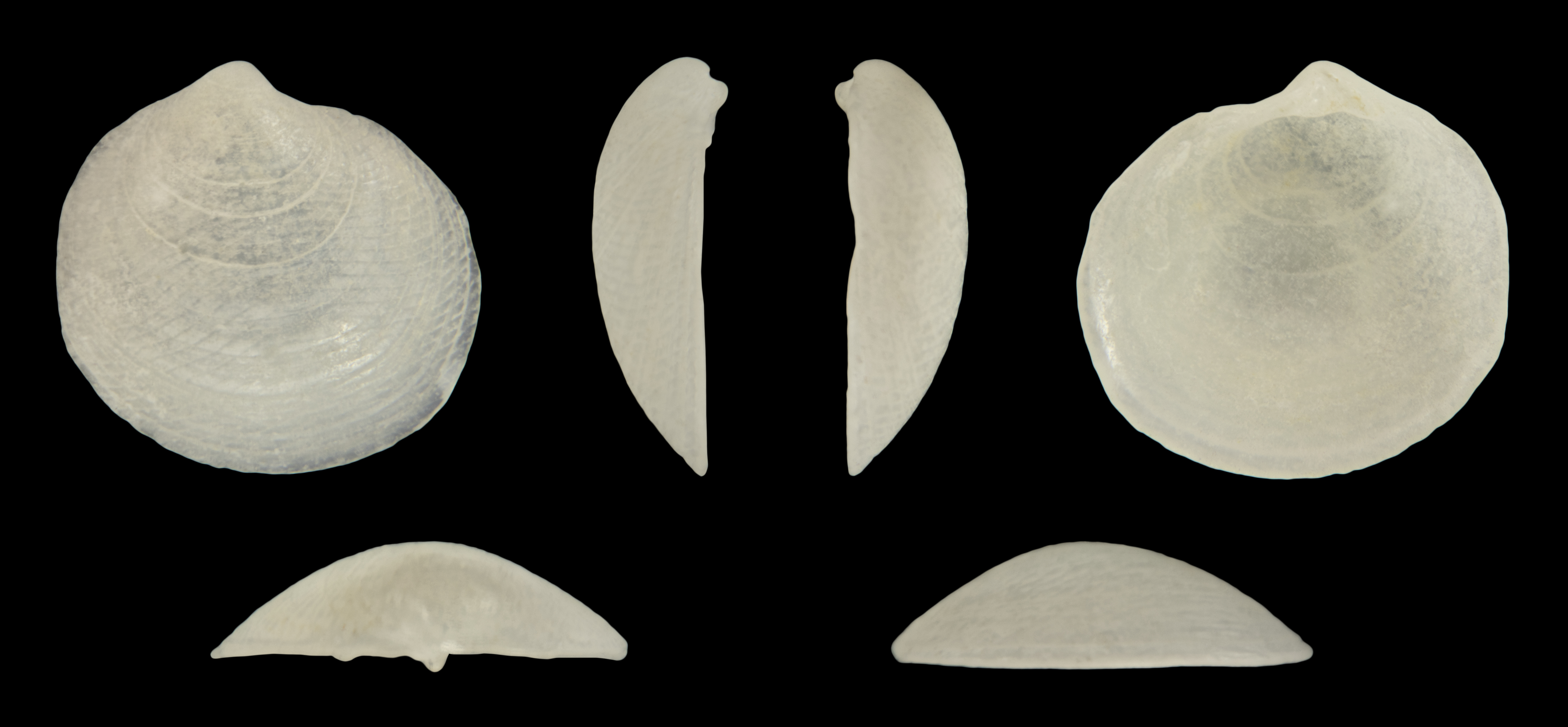
- Right valve
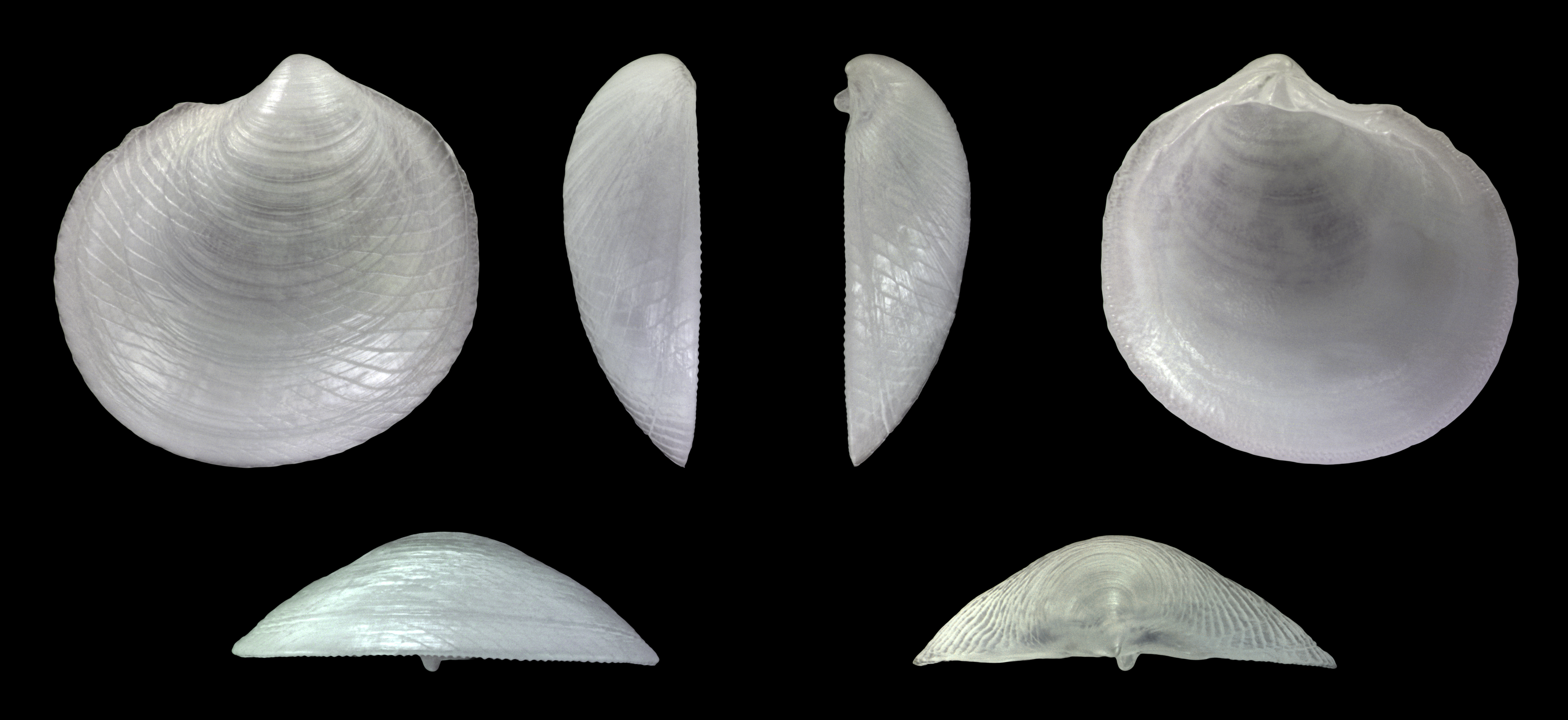
- Left valve

Scientific classification
- Kingdom: Animalia
- Phylum: Mollusca
- Class: Bivalvia
- Order: Lucinida
- Family: Lucinidae
- Genus: Lucinella
- Species: L. divaricata

Binomial name
- Lucinella divaricata (Linnaeus, 1758)

= Lucinella divaricata =

Species of marine bivalve mollusc

Lucinella divaricata, the divaricate lucine, is a small marine bivalve mollusc of the family Lucinidae found in the north eastern Atlantic and the Mediterranean. Its fossils are known from Cenozoic deposits all over Europe. Chemoautotrophic bacteria in their gills enable them to survive well in substrates rich in hydrogen sulfide.

== Description ==
The valves are small and nearly round, about 5–10 mm (0.20–0.39 in) in diameter, the beak is slightly twisted towards the anterior. The lunule is deep and the internal margin slightly crenulated. Deeply inset ligament.

Two cardinal teeth in the left valve and one large triangular cardinal tooth in the right, two lateral teeth in each valve.

The adductor muscle scars are distinct and very similar in size. Recent shells are typically white or cream and notably thin. In addition to concentric growth rings, the valves prominently exhibit fine ridges.

== Geographic range ==
Living Lucinella divaricata can be found in the Mediterranean, the Black Sea and the Eastern Atlantic, from the English Channel all the way down to Madeira and the Canary Islands.

The species' fossil distribution is much harder to pin down owing to a general lack of information and frequent misidentification, but they have been documented in nearly all Southern European countries as well as the United Kingdom, and sediments of the North and Baltic Seas.

== Taxonomy ==
The taxon was described by Linnaeus in Systema Naturae in 1758 as Tellina divaricata, and served as the type for the genus Lucinella (described by Monterosato 1884).

Lamarck and Chemnitz (among others), confused the species Linné described - Mediterranean and only about the size of a pea - for a similar looking larger bivalve found in the Western Atlantic. Literature still often cited both species' ranges up until the middle of the 19th century, leading to "Lucina divaricata" being thought of as a transatlantic species. The error was pointed out by Philippi in 1836, however instead of returning the name L. divaricata to Linné's European bivalve, he proposed that it should remain with the American species, and that the European species be renamed to L. commutata.

During this time, various other synonymous names were proposed for these two bivalves, but today it is again Linné's European Tellina divaricata which is called Lucinella divaricata, while Lamarck's American species is called Divalinga quadrisulcata.
