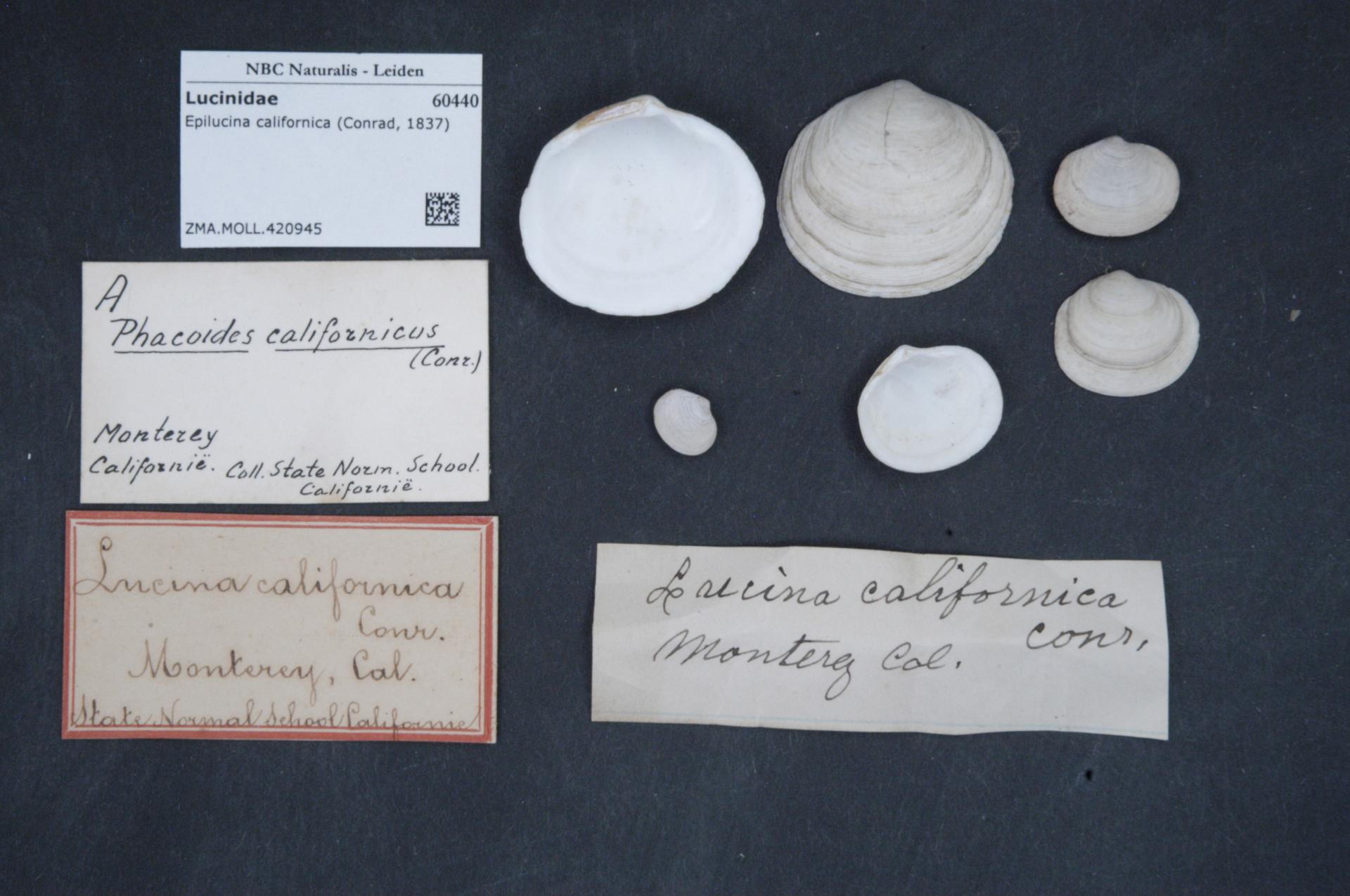

Scientific classification
- Kingdom: Animalia
- Phylum: Mollusca
- Class: Bivalvia
- Order: Lucinida
- Family: Lucinidae
- Genus: Epilucina
- Species: E. californica

Binomial name
- Epilucina californica (Conrad, 1837)

Synonyms
- Lucina californica Conrad, 1837; Lucina artemidis A. Gould & P. P. Carpenter, 1857; †Lucina japonica Ozaki, 1958; †Lucina nipponica Nomura & Hatai, 1936

= Epilucina californica =

Epilucina californica Temporal range: Late Miocene–recent

Species of bivalve

Epilucina californica is a species of small saltwater clams in the family Lucinidae. It is found from central California to Baja California. Historical records claim that it lived from Crescent City to San Diego. The oldest known fossil record of this species is from the Miocene of Japan, indicating that it likely originated in the Eastern North Pacific and expanded before being restricted to its current range.
