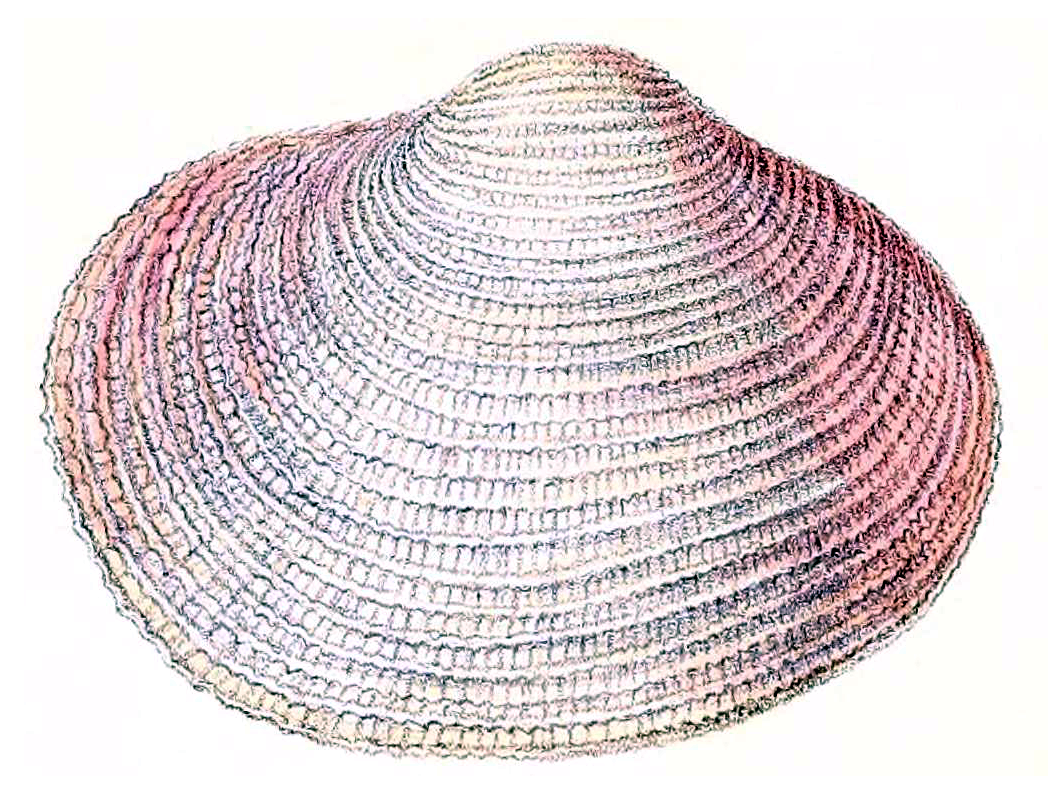
- Fimbria soverbii. Illustration from Conchologia Iconica, or Illustrations of the shells of molluscous animals, Vol. 18, London: L. Reeve and Co., 1873

Scientific classification
- Kingdom: Animalia
- Phylum: Mollusca
- Class: Bivalvia
- Order: Lucinida
- Family: Lucinidae
- Genus: Fimbria
- Species: F. soverbii

Binomial name
- Fimbria soverbii (Reeve, 1842)

Synonyms
- †Cavilucina elegans (Deshayes, 1823); Corbis elegans Deshayes, 1843; Corbis soverbii

= Fimbria soverbii =

Species of bivalve

Fimbria soverbii is a species of marine clams in the family Lucinidae.
