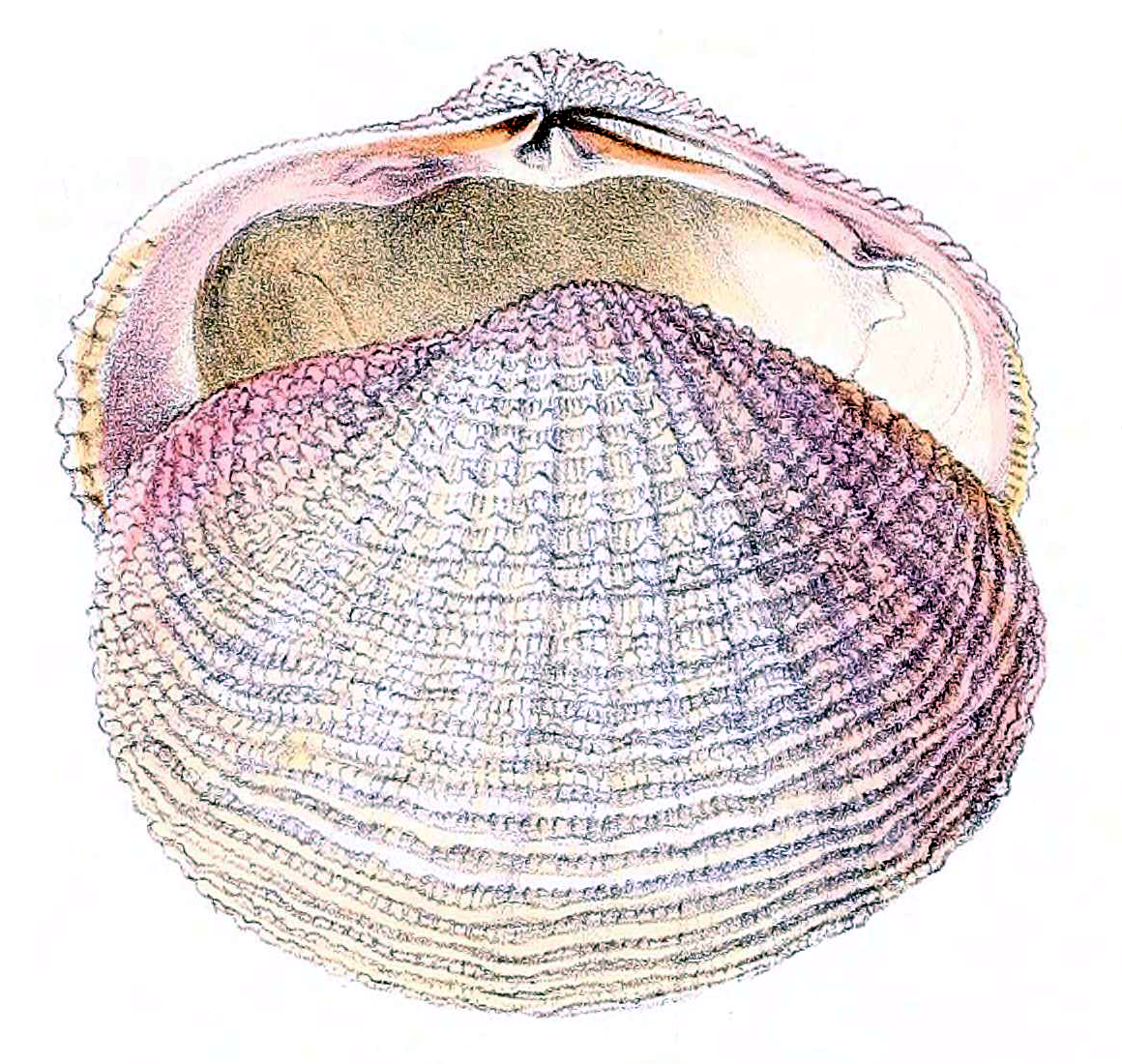
- Fimbria fimbriata

Scientific classification
- Domain: Eukaryota
- Kingdom: Animalia
- Phylum: Mollusca
- Class: Bivalvia
- Order: Lucinida
- Family: Lucinidae
- Subfamily: Fimbriinae; Nicol, 1950

Type genus
- Fimbria Megerle von Mühlfeld, 1811

Genera
- †Cerkesia Monari, 2003; †Cyclopellatia Cossmann, 1907; Fimbria Megerle von Mühlfeld, 1811; †Haastina Marwick, 1953; †Mutiella Stoliczka, 1871; †Parvicorbis Cossmann, 1892; †Schafhaeutlia Cossmann, 1897; †Sphaera J. Sowerby, 1822; †Sphaeriola Stoliczka, 1871

Synonyms
- Corbiidae Stoliczka, 1870 junior subjective synonym; Corbinae Stoliczka, 1870 junior subjective synonym; Fimbriidae Nicol, 1950 (1870)

= Fimbriinae =

Family of bivalves

Fimbriinae is a subfamily of saltwater clams. marine bivalve molluscs in the family Lucinidae.

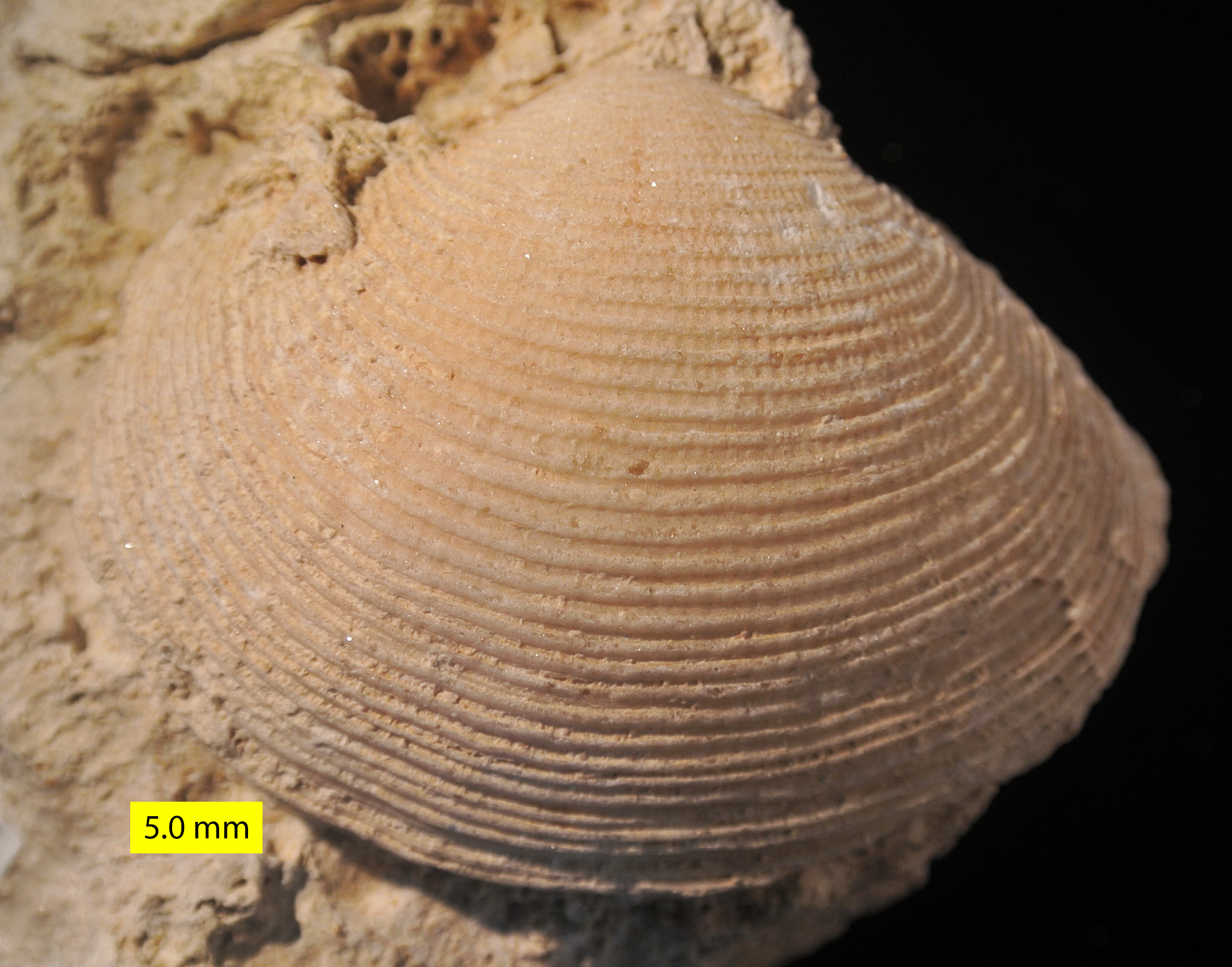
Fimbria sp; Matmor Formation (Middle Jurassic, Callovian); Makhtesh Gadol, southern Israel
