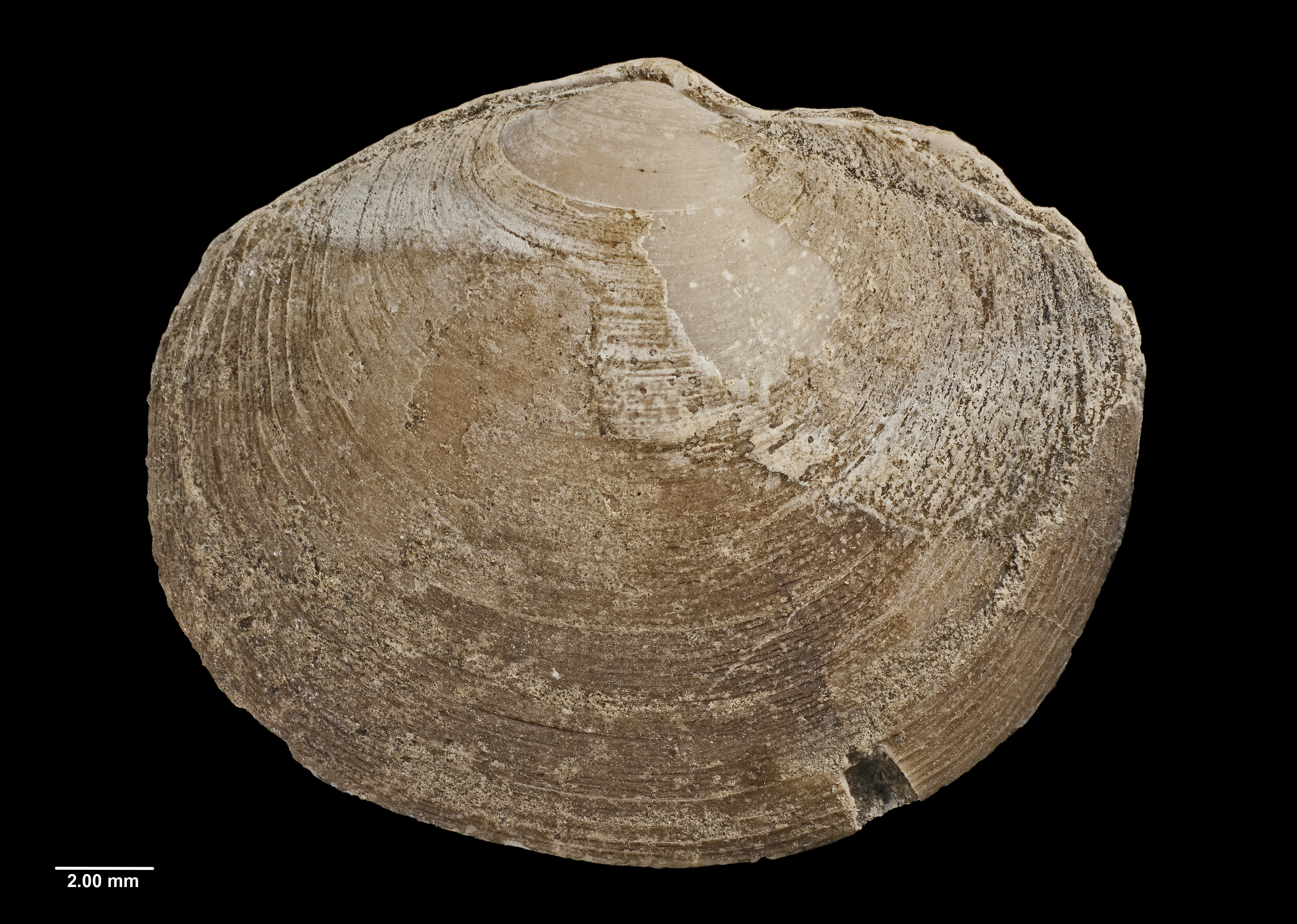
- Holotype from Auckland War Memorial Museum

Scientific classification
- Kingdom: Animalia
- Phylum: Mollusca
- Class: Bivalvia
- Order: Lucinida
- Family: Lucinidae
- Genus: †Pteromyrtea
- Species: †P. motutaraensis

Binomial name
- †Pteromyrtea motutaraensis A. W. B. Powell, 1935

= Pteromyrtea motutaraensis =

Pteromyrtea motutaraensis Temporal range: early Miocene

Extinct species of gastropod

Pteromyrtea motutaraensis is an extinct species of bivalve, a marine mollusc in the family Lucinidae. Fossils of the species date to early Miocene strata of the west coast of the Auckland Region, New Zealand.

== Description ==
In the original description, Powell described the species as follows:

Shell of moderate size, ovate, longer than high, somewhat inflated, rather thin. Beaks central. Lunule narrowly lanceolate. Anterior wing long and clearly marked off by a groove. Sculpture consisting of extremely fine regular concentric threads, about five per millimetre. Valve margins smooth. Hinge typical, as shown by a paratype.

The holotype of the species measures 17 mm (0.67 in) in height and 21 mm (0.83 in) in length. The species can be identified sue to its more oval outline than other members of Pteromyrtea.

== Taxonomy ==
The species was first described by A. W. B. Powell in 1935. The holotype was collected at an unknown date prior to 1935 from fallen rocks at southern Maukatia Bay, south of Muriwai, Auckland Region (then more commonly known as Motutara), and is held in the collections of Auckland War Memorial Museum.

== Distribution ==
This extinct marine species occurs in early Miocene strata of the Nihotupu Formation of New Zealand, on the west coast of the Waitākere Ranges of the Auckland Region, New Zealand. The deposits of the Nihotupu Formation in the western Waitākere Ranges where fossils of the species have been founs are mid-bathyal 800–2,000 m (2,600–6,600 ft).

== Gallery ==
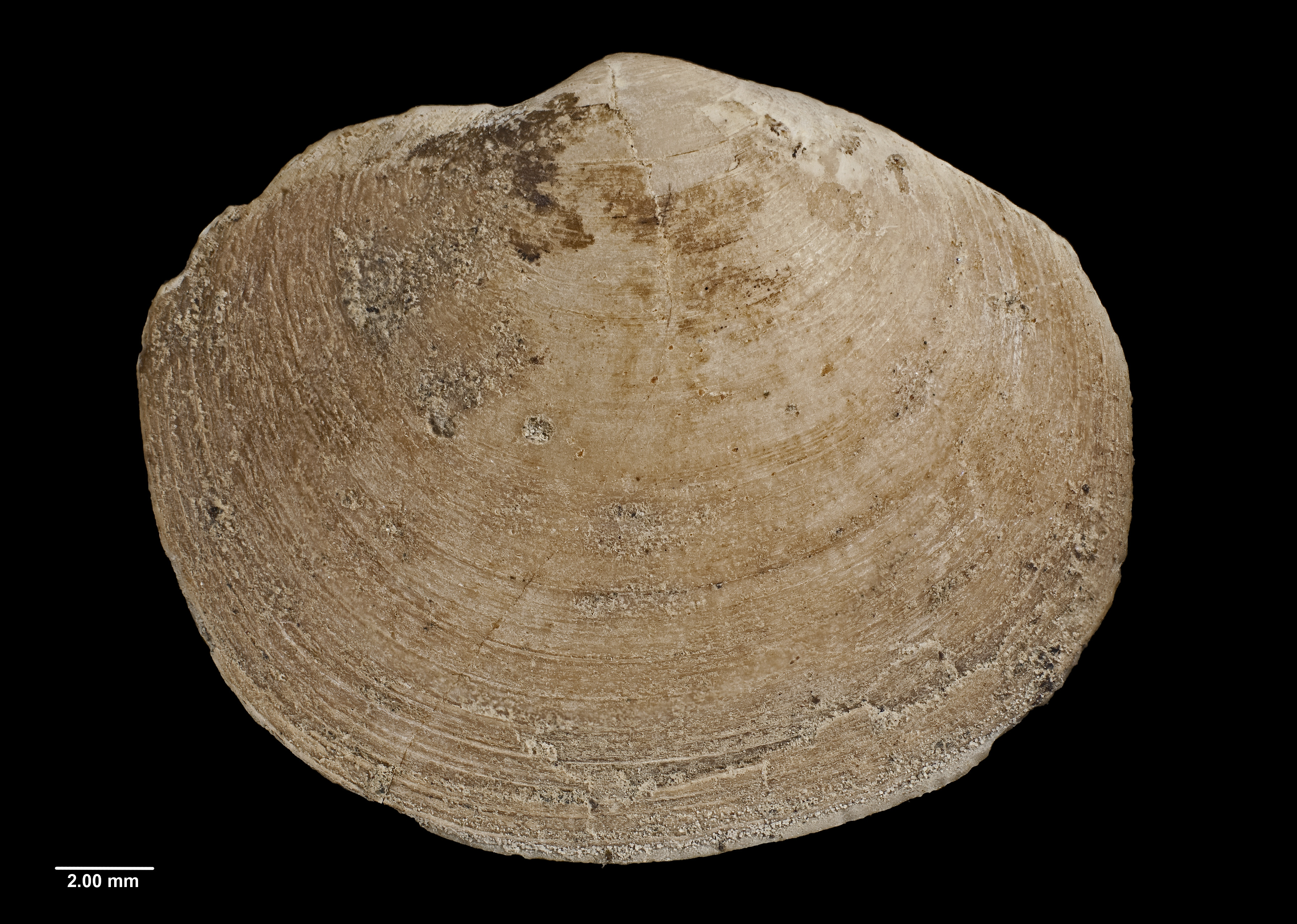
View of second valve of holotype

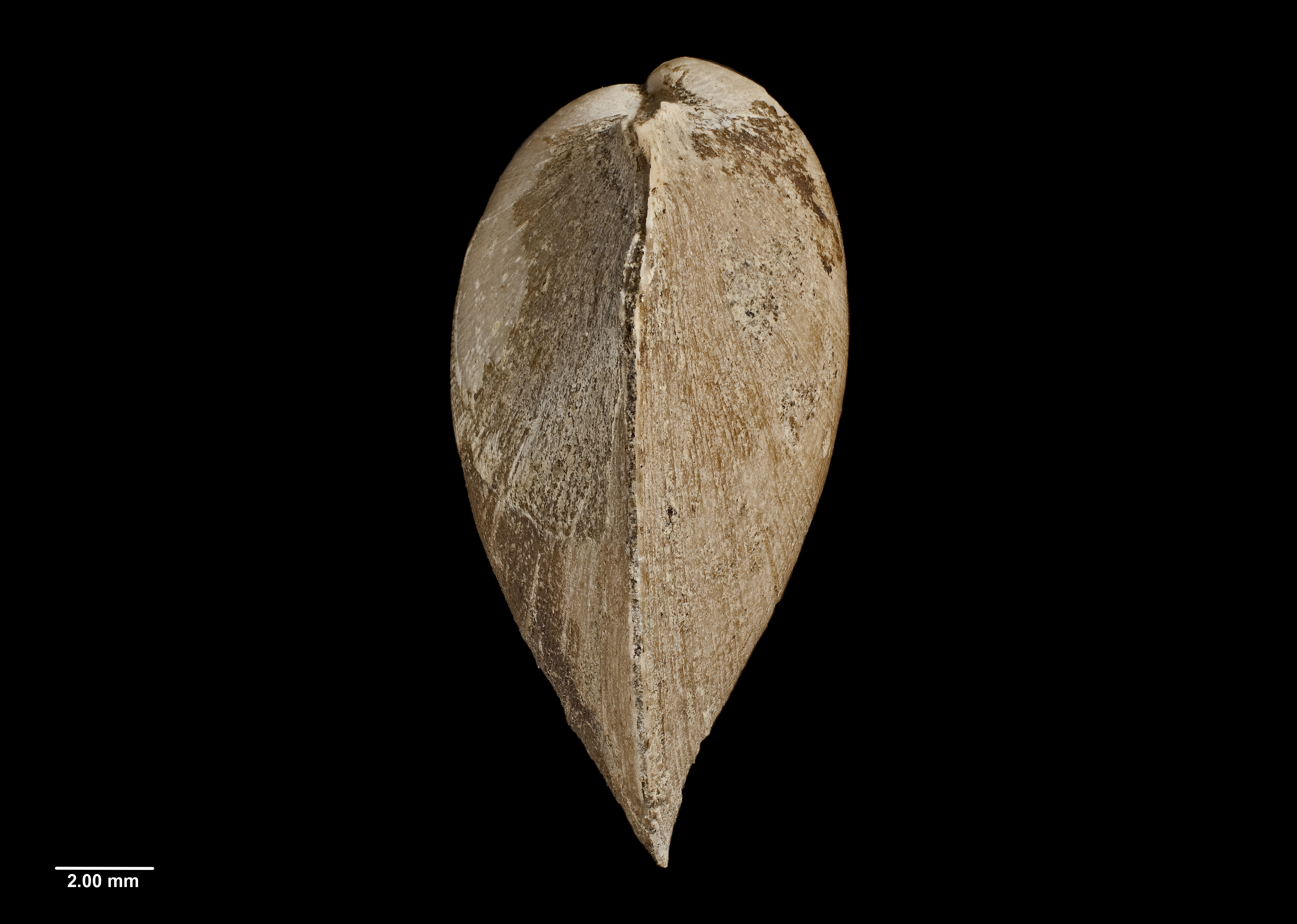
Side view of holotype

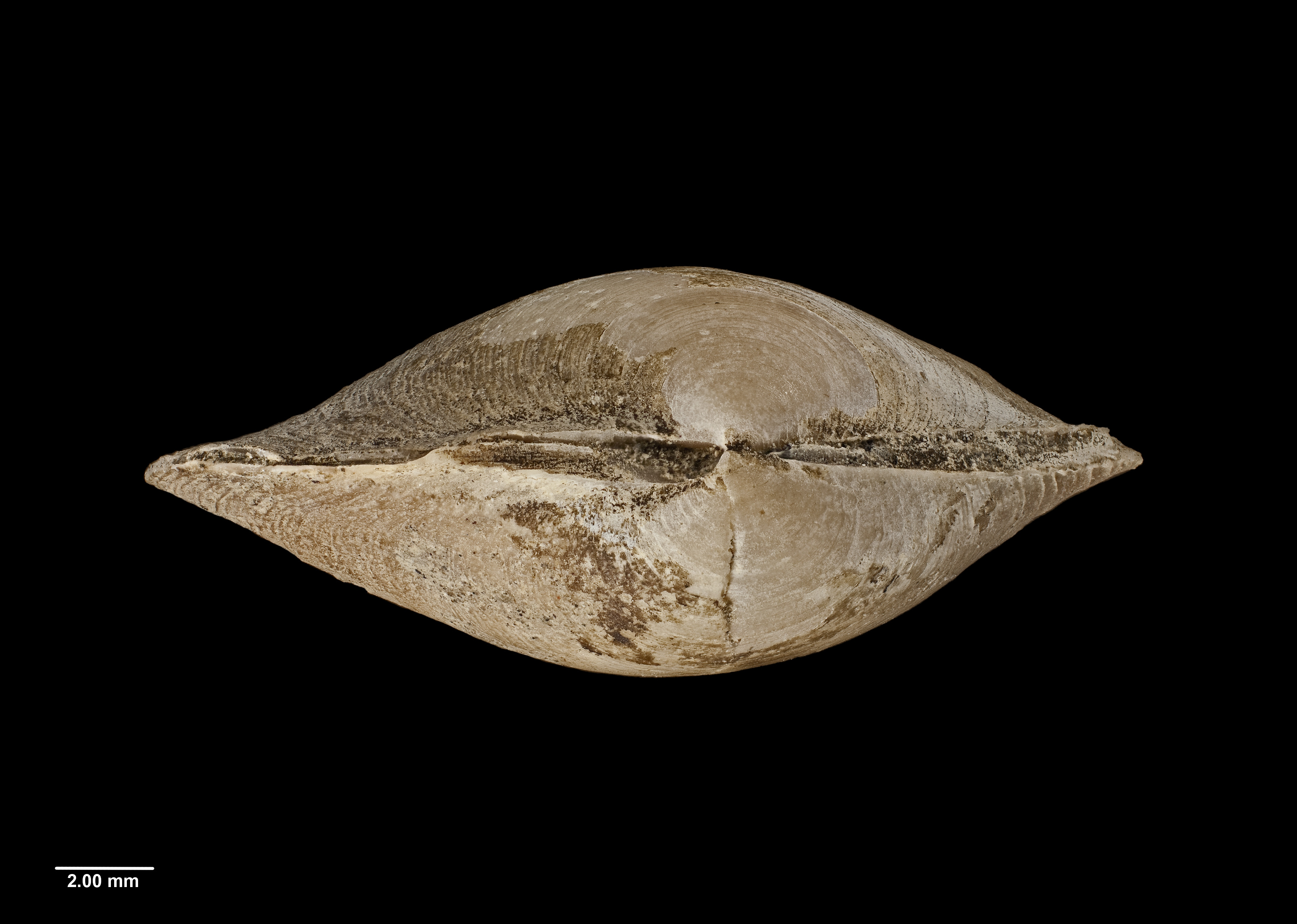
Side view of holotype
