= Epilucina =

Scientific classification
- Kingdom: Animalia
- Phylum: Mollusca
- Class: Bivalvia
- Order: Lucinida
- Family: Lucinidae
- Genus: Epilucina; Dall, 1901

Species
- See text.

Genus of bivalves

Epilucina is a genus of small saltwater clams, marine bivalve mollusks in the family Lucinidae, the lucinids. The only extant species is Epilucina californica, found from central California to Baja California.

The species in this genus were originally assigned to the genus Lucina, and later erected as the genus Phacoides by William Healey Dall.

== Species ==
The only extant species is E. californica. Extinct species within the genus Epilucina include:

- Epilucina washingtoniana (Washington, Oregon, California)
- Epilucina concentrica (France, United Kingdom)
- Epilucina gabrielensis (Colombia)
