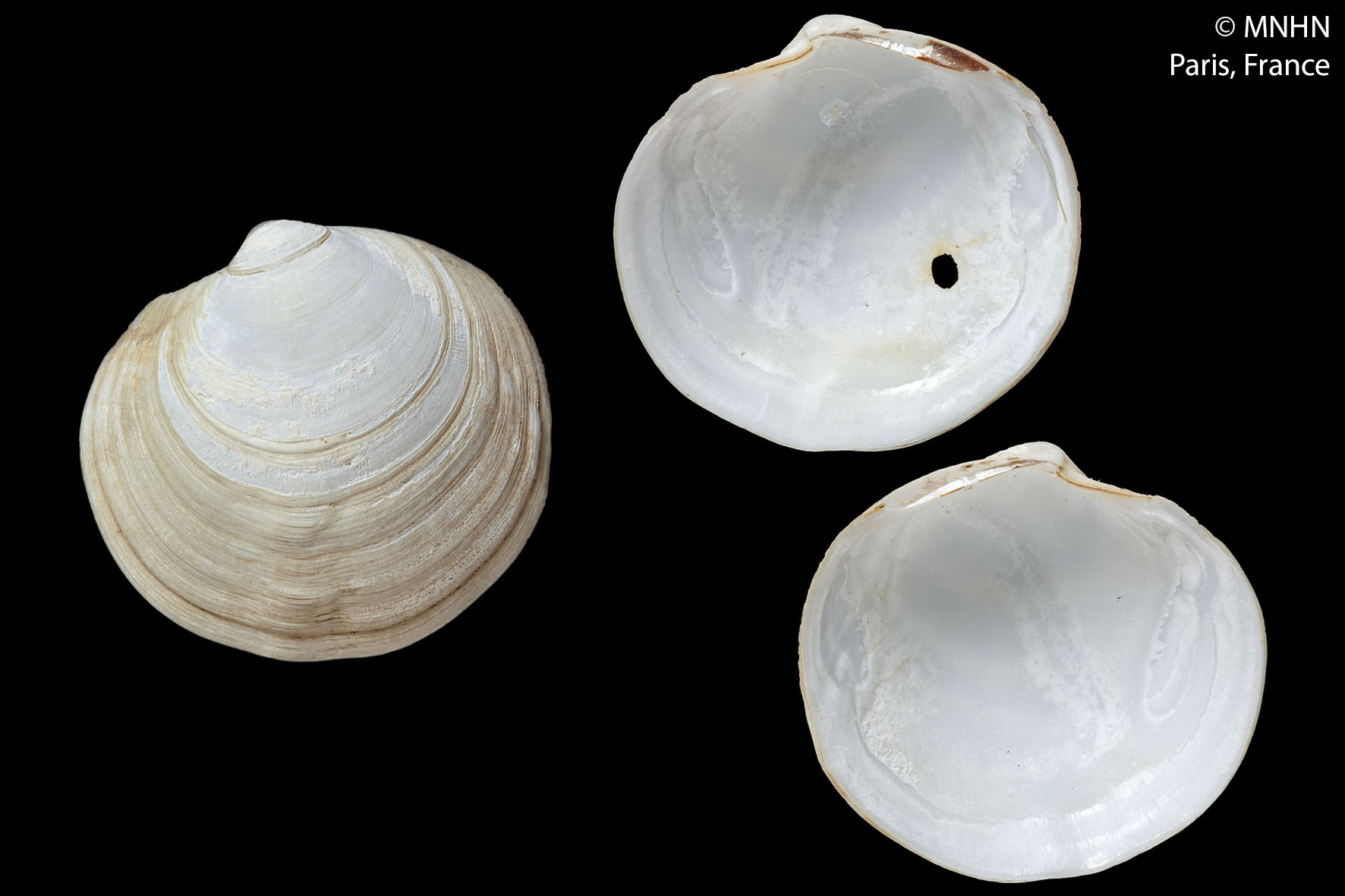
- Shell of Troendleina suluensis (holotype at MNHN, Paris)

Scientific classification
- Domain: Eukaryota
- Kingdom: Animalia
- Phylum: Mollusca
- Class: Bivalvia
- Order: Lucinida
- Superfamily: Lucinoidea
- Family: Lucinidae
- Genus: Troendleina; Cosel & Bouchet, 2008

Type species
- Troendleina marquesana Cosel & Bouchet, 2008

= Troendleina =

Genus of bivalve

Troendleina is a chemosymbiotic bivalve genus in the subfamily Lucininae of the family Lucinidae.

== Species ==
- Troendleina marquesana Cosel & Bouchet, 2008
- Troendleina musculator Cosel & Bouchet, 2008
- Troendleina suluensis Glover & J. D. Taylor, 2016
