= Bourdotia =

Bourdotia may refer to:

- Bourdotia (bivalve), a genus of bivalves in the family Lucinidae
- Bourdotia (fungus), a genus of fungi
