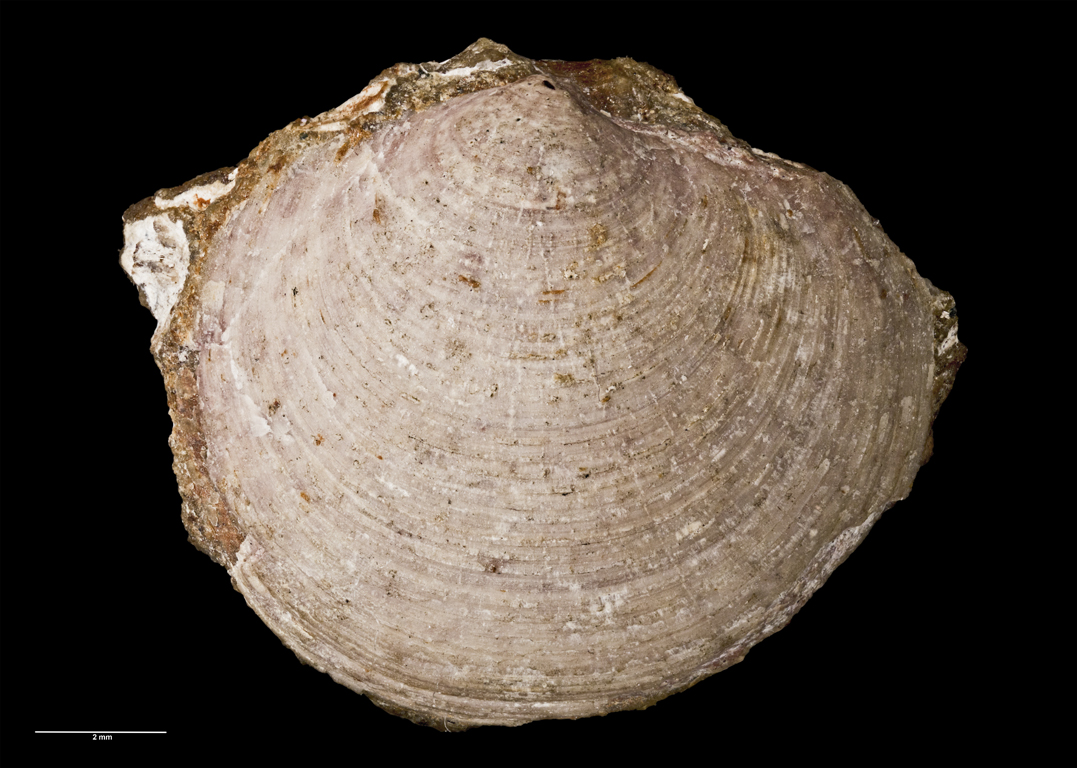
- Pteromyrtea obesa

Scientific classification
- Kingdom: Animalia
- Phylum: Mollusca
- Class: Bivalvia
- Order: Lucinida
- Family: Lucinidae
- Genus: †Pteromyrtea; H. J. Finlay, 1926

Type species
- † Cyclina dispar F. W. Hutton, 1873

Synonyms
- Notomyrtea (Pteromyrtea) H. J. Finlay, 1926

= Pteromyrtea =

Pteromyrtea Temporal range: Cretaceous–Miocene

Genus of bivalves

Pteromyrtea is a genus of extinct marine bivalve molluscs in the family Lucinidae. Species in the genus date to between the Cretaceous and the Miocene, and have been found in strata in Argentina and New Zealand.

== Taxonomy ==
Pteromyrtea was first described in 1926 by Harold Finlay as a subgenus of Notomyrtea. The taxon has since been elevated to genus level.

== Distribution ==
Fossils of the genus date to between the Cretaceous and Miocene, and have been found in Argentina and New Zealand. Many New Zealand species date to the Altonian stage (early Miocene) of New Zealand.

== Species ==
Species within the genus Pteromyrtea include:

- † Pteromyrtea auriculata (Bartrum, 1919)
- † Pteromyrtea cristata Marwick, 1931
- † Pteromyrtea danieli del Río, 1994
- † Pteromyrtea dispar (F. W. Hutton, 1873)
- † Pteromyrtea disparilis Laws, 1944
- † Pteromyrtea exilis Marwick, 1943
- † Pteromyrtea laminata (F. W. Hutton, 1885)
- † Pteromyrtea motutaraensis A. W. B. Powell, 1935
- † Pteromyrtea obesa H. J. Finlay & Marwick, 1937
- † Pteromyrtea tirangiensis (Marwick, 1926)
