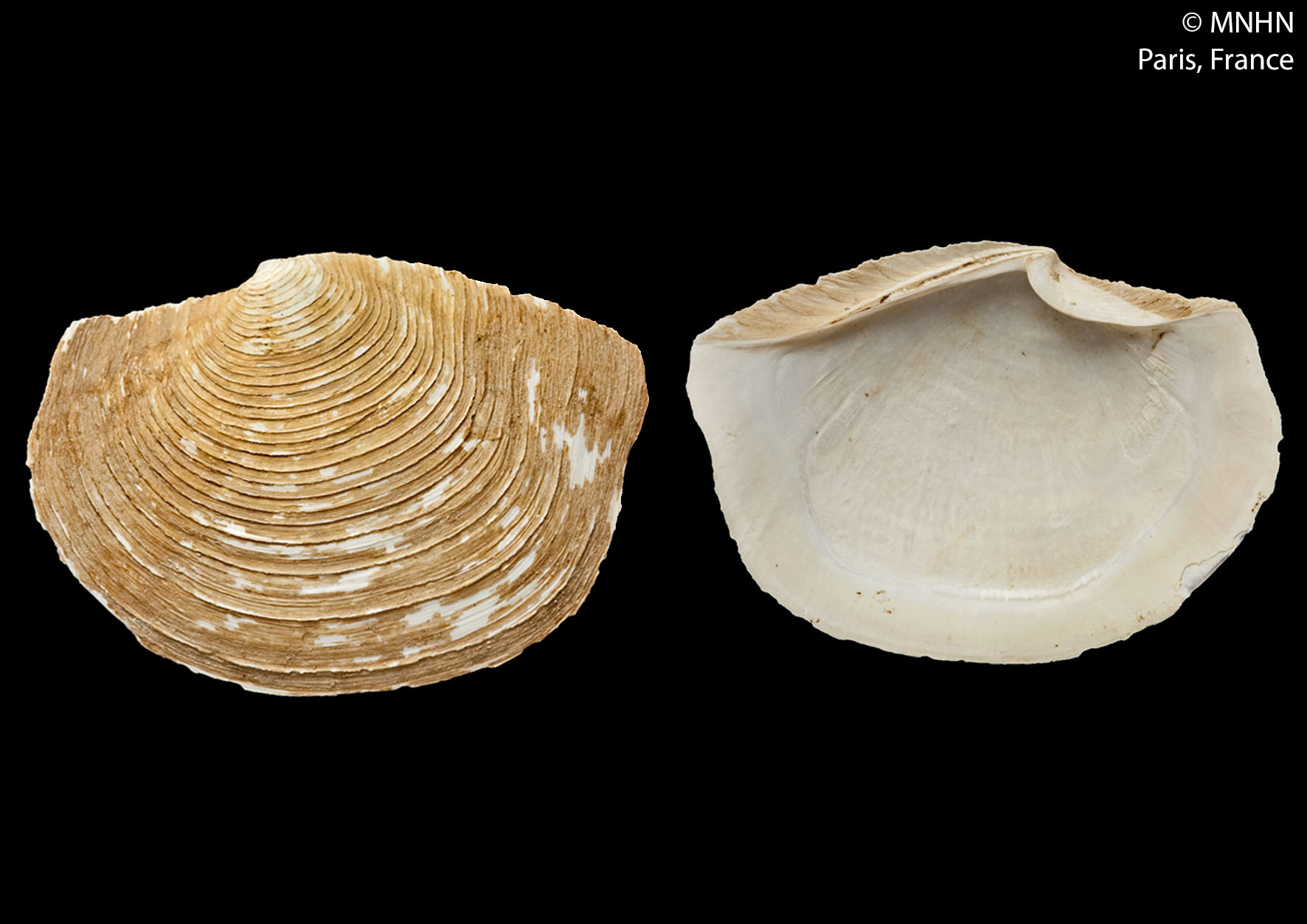
- Shell of Taylorina alata (specimen at MNHN, Paris)

Scientific classification
- Kingdom: Animalia
- Phylum: Mollusca
- Class: Bivalvia
- Order: Lucinida
- Superfamily: Lucinoidea
- Family: Lucinidae
- Genus: Taylorina; Cosel & Bouchet, 2008

Type species
- Taylorina alata Cosel & Bouchet, 2008

= Taylorina =

Genus of molluscs

Taylorina is a genus of bivalves on the subfamily Myrteinae, belonging to the family Lucinidae.

== Distribution ==
This marine species occurs off the Philippines at depths between 1240 m and 1258 m.

== Species ==
- Taylorina alata Cosel & Bouchet, 2008
- Taylorina makassar Cosel & Bouchet, 2008
- Taylorina manusutor Cosel & Bouchet, 2008
- Taylorina solomonensis Cosel & Bouchet, 2008
