= Cavilucina =

Cavilucina Temporal range: 189.6–0.781 Ma

Scientific classification
- Domain: Eukaryota
- Kingdom: Animalia
- Phylum: Mollusca
- Class: Bivalvia
- Order: Lucinida
- Family: Lucinidae
- Genus: Cavilucina; Fischer, 1887

Subgenera
- †Cavilucina (Cavilucina) Fischer 1887; †Cavilucina (Mesomiltha) Chavan 1938

Synonyms
- Miltha (Cavilucina); Phacoides (Cavilucina)

Genus of bivalves

Cavilucina is a genus of bivalves in the family Lucinidae.

== Overview of species ==
- Cavilucina citrina (Angas, 1879)
- Cavilucina fieldingi (H. Adams, 1871)
- Cavilucina pamela (Melvill & Standen, 1907)

Fossil species

- †Cavilucina elegans Fischer, 1887 (Lutetian of France)
- †Cavilucina (Cavilucina) sulcata (Lamarck, 1806)
- †Cavilucina (Mesomiltha) bellona d'Orbigny 1850
- †Cavilucina (Mesomiltha) orbignyana d'Archiac 1843
- †Cavilucina (Mesomiltha) subgeometrica Fischer 1969

Names brought to synonymy

- †Cavilucina elegans (Deshayes, 1823), a synonym of Fimbria soverbii (Reeve, 1842).
