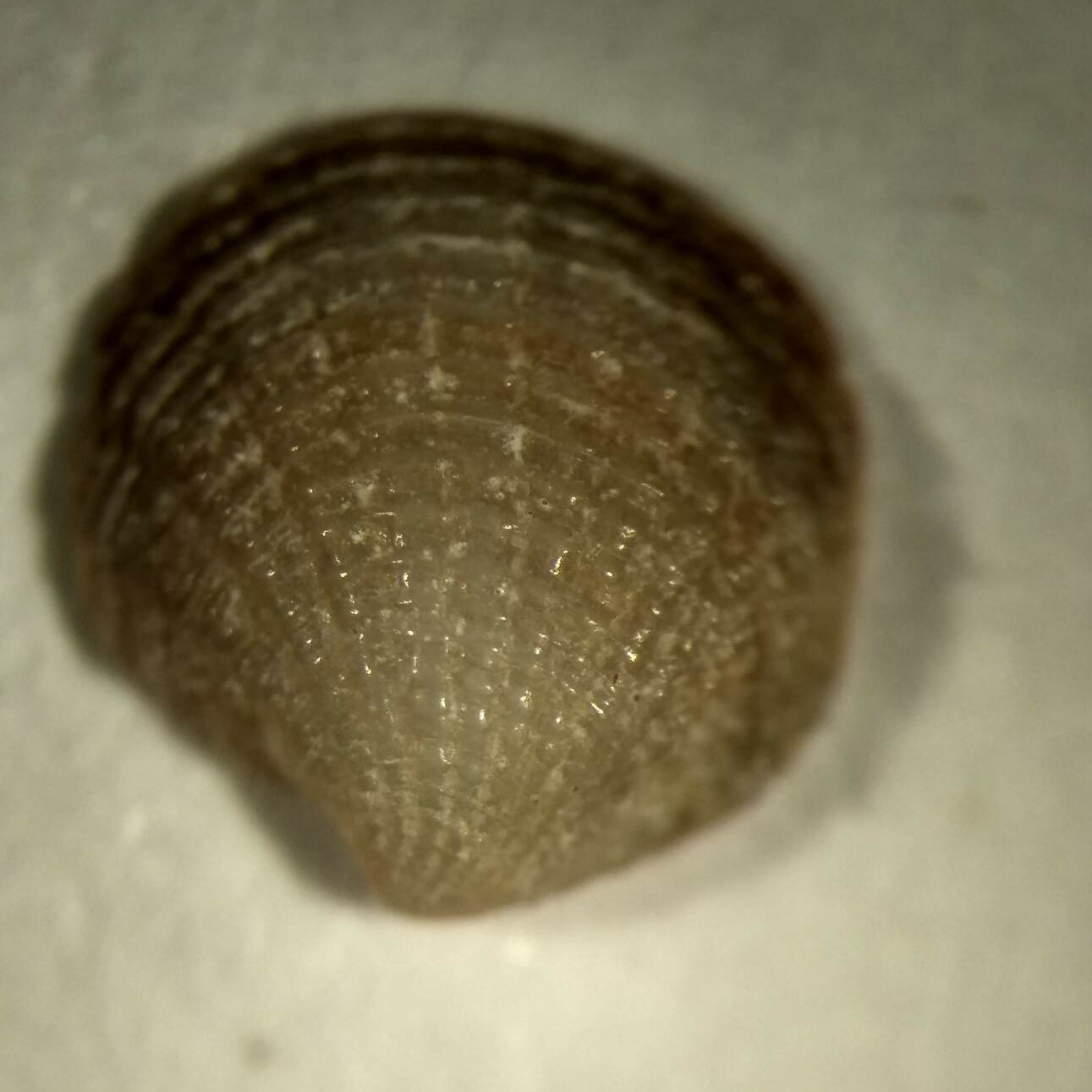

Scientific classification
- Kingdom: Animalia
- Phylum: Mollusca
- Class: Bivalvia
- Order: Lucinida
- Superfamily: Lucinoidea
- Family: Lucinidae
- Genus: Radiolucina
- Species: R. amianta

Binomial name
- Radiolucina amianta (Dall, 1901)

Synonyms
- List: Linga amianta (Dall, 1901); Linga amiantus [lapsus]; Lucina amianta (Dall, 1901); Lucina amiantus [lapsus]; Parvilucina amianta (Dall, 1901); Phacoides (Bellucina) amiantus Dall, 1901

= Radiolucina amianta =

Species of bivalve

Lucina amiantus, or the decorated lucine, is a species of bivalve mollusc in the family Lucinidae.

It can be found along the Atlantic coast of North America, from North Carolina to the West Indies and Brazil.
