= Corbis =

Corbis may refer to:

- Corbis Corporation, an American advertising and licensing company, later renamed Branded Entertainment Network
- Corbis, a synonym for the bivalve genus Fimbria
