= Cardiolucina =

Scientific classification
- Kingdom: Animalia
- Phylum: Mollusca
- Class: Bivalvia
- Order: Lucinida
- Family: Lucinidae
- Genus: Cardiolucina; Sacco, 1901

Synonyms
- Bellucina Dall, 1901

Genus of bivalves

Cardiolucina is a genus of bivalves belonging to the family Lucinidae.

The genus has almost cosmopolitan distribution.

== Species ==
Species:

- Cardiolucina agassizii (Michelotti, 1839)
- Cardiolucina australopilula J.D.Taylor & Glover, 1997
- Cardiolucina civica (Yokoyama, 1927)
