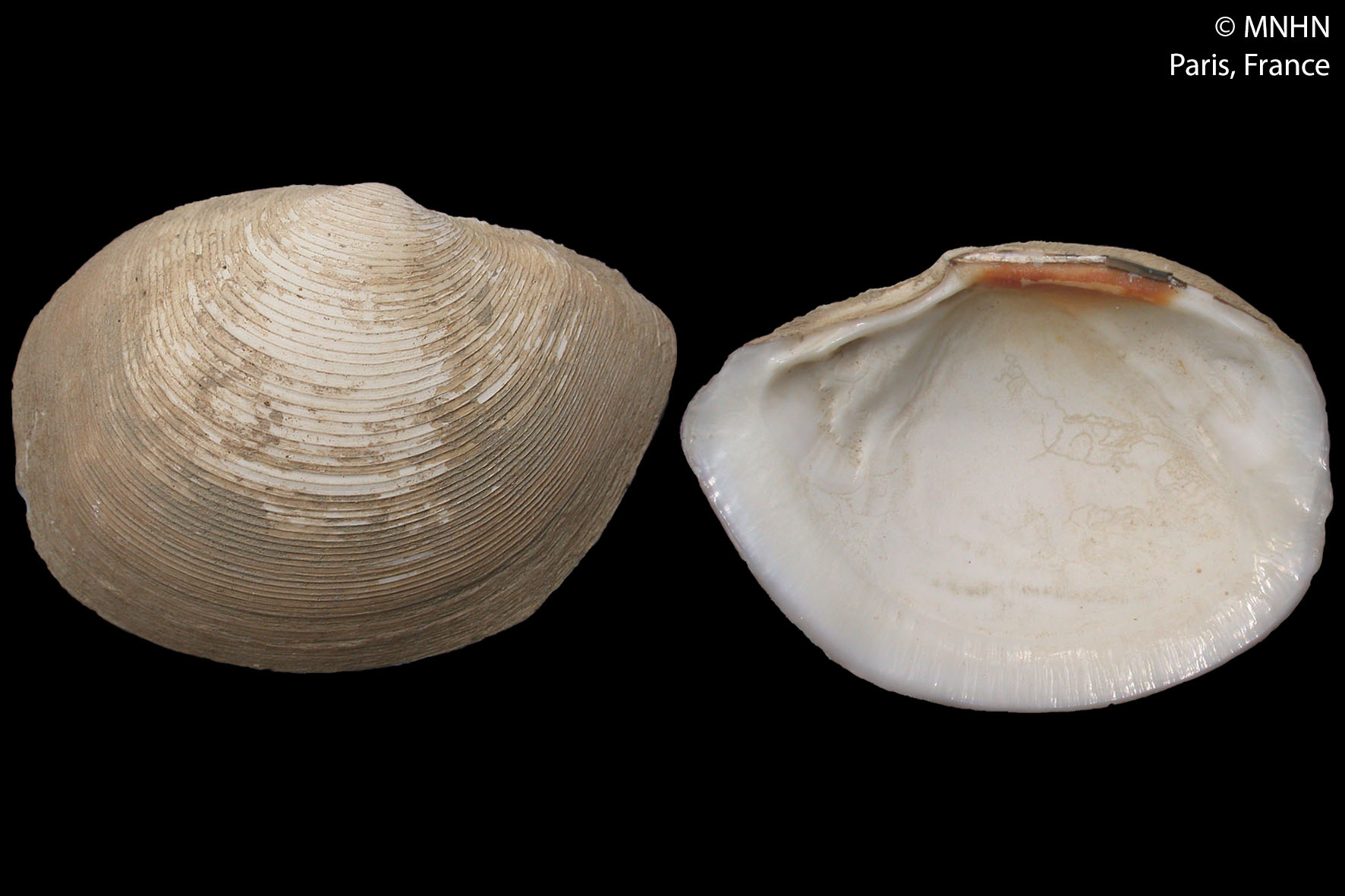
- Shell of Rostrilucina anterostrata (holotype at MNHN, Paris)

Scientific classification
- Domain: Eukaryota
- Kingdom: Animalia
- Phylum: Mollusca
- Class: Bivalvia
- Order: Lucinida
- Superfamily: Lucinoidea
- Family: Lucinidae
- Genus: Rostrilucina; Cosel & Bouchet, 2008

Type species
- Rostrilucina garuda Cosel & Bouchet, 2008

= Rostrilucina =

Genus of bivalves

Rostrilucina is a genus of bivalves on the subfamily Myrteinae, belonging to the family Lucinidae.

== Species ==
- Rostrilucina anterostrata Cosel & Bouchet, 2008
- Rostrilucina garuda Cosel & Bouchet, 2008
