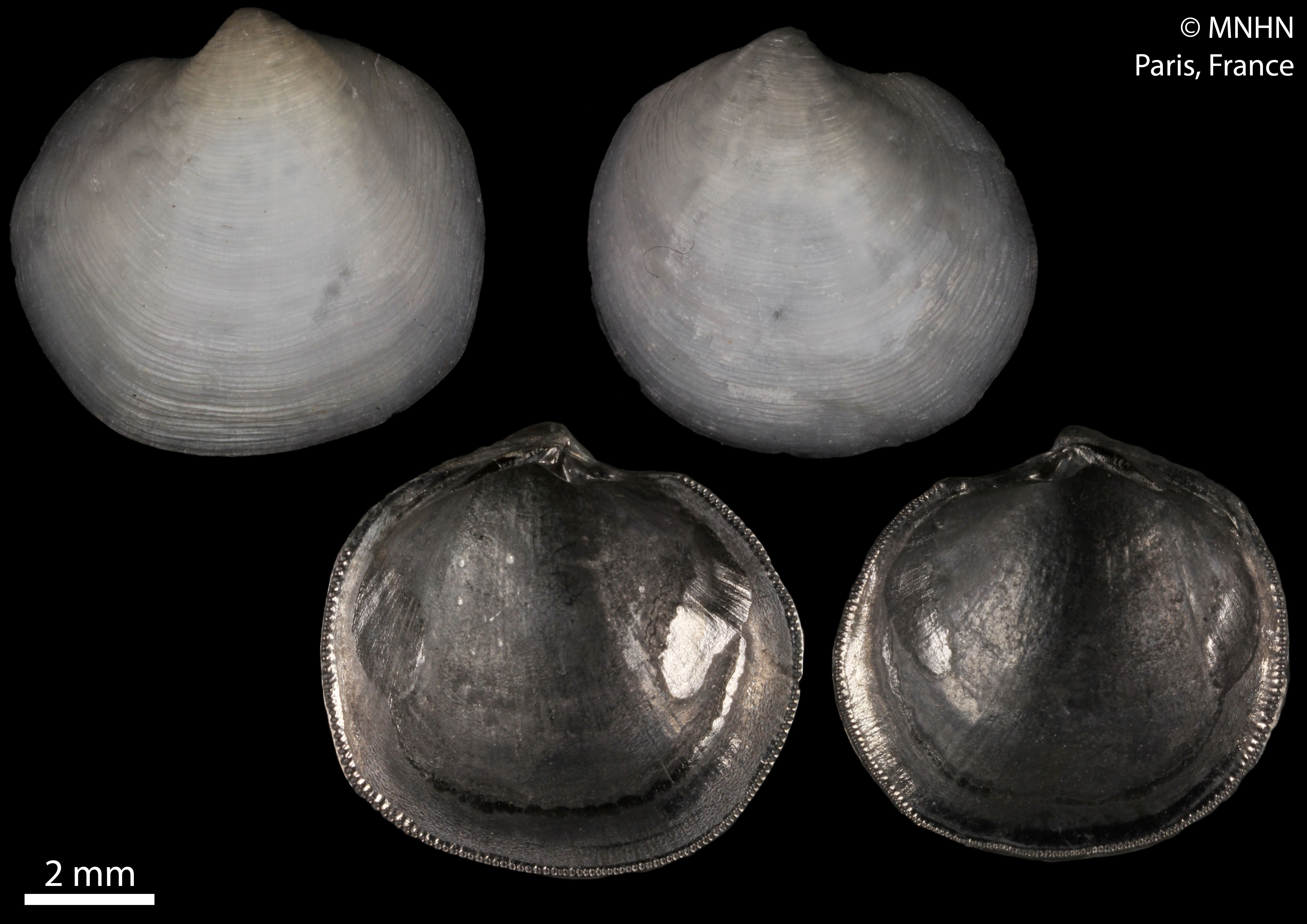
- Shell of Wallucina fijiensis (specimen at MNHN, Paris)

Scientific classification
- Kingdom: Animalia
- Phylum: Mollusca
- Class: Bivalvia
- Order: Lucinida
- Superfamily: Lucinoidea
- Family: Lucinidae
- Genus: Wallucina; Iredale, 1930

Type species
- Lucina (Loripes) jacksoniensis E. A. Smith, 1885

Synonyms
- Wallucina (Wallucina) Iredale, 1930

= Wallucina =

Genus of bivalve

Wallucina is a chemosymbiotic bivalve genus in the subfamily Lucininae of the family Lucinidae.

== Distribution ==
This marine genus occurs in the Central Indo-west Pacific and off temperate Australia (New South Wales, Queensland, South Australia, Tasmania, Victoria, Western Australia)

== Species ==
- Wallucina assimilis (Angas, 1868)
- Wallucina fijiensis (E. A. Smith, 1885)
- † Wallucina simulans (Tate, 1887)

Synonyms

- Wallucina izuensis Okutani & Matsukuma, 1982 synonym of Epicodakia izuensis (Okutani & Matsukuma, 1982)
- Wallucina lamyi (Chavan, 1938): synonym of Chavania striata (Tokunaga, 1906)
- Wallucina striata (Tokunaga, 1906): synonym of Chavania striata (Tokunaga, 1906)
- Wallucina xishaensis Lan, 1997 (unavailable name: no description)
