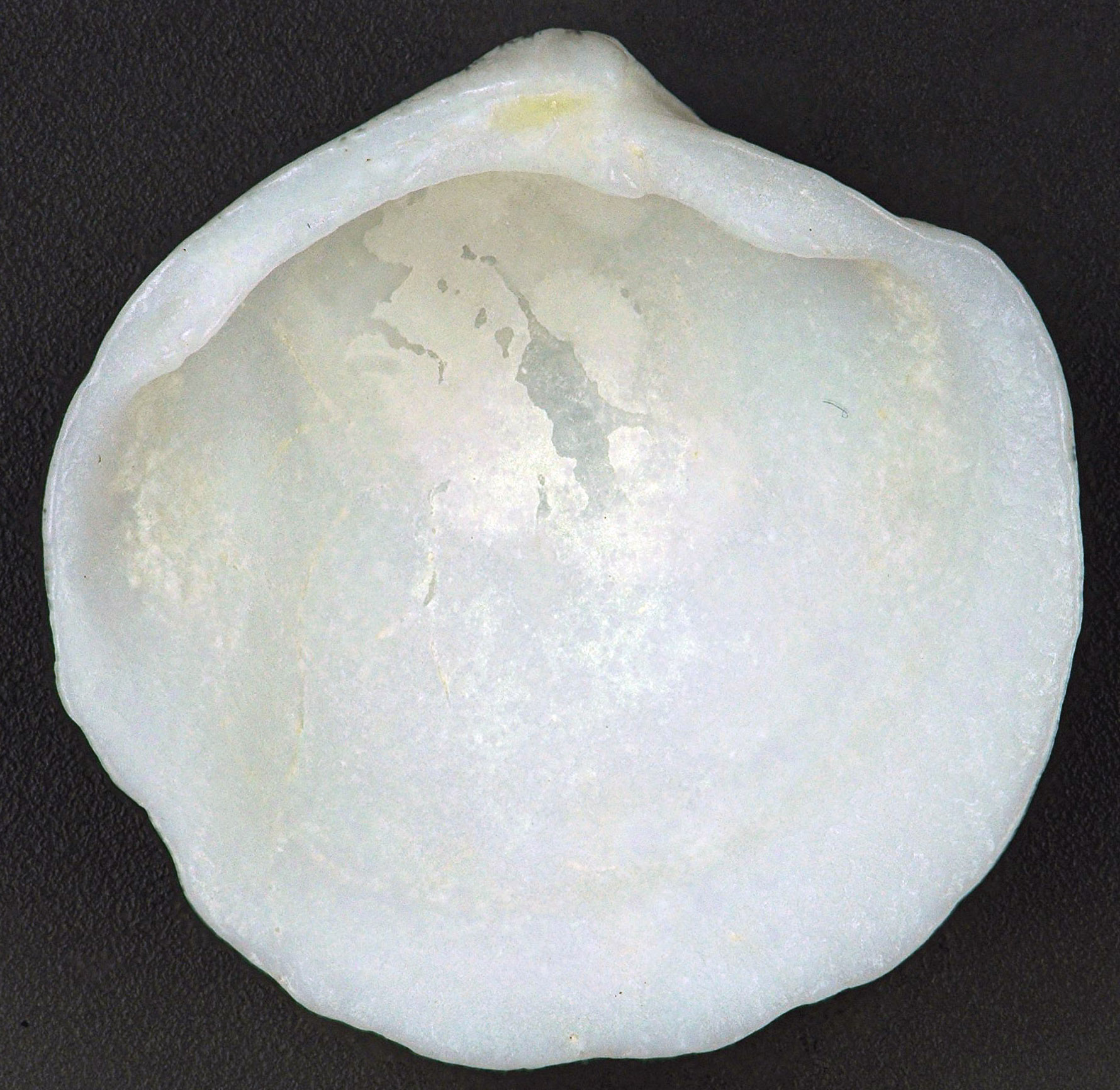
- Lucina pensylvanica shell

Scientific classification
- Kingdom: Animalia
- Phylum: Mollusca
- Class: Bivalvia
- Order: Lucinida
- Superfamily: Lucinoidea
- Family: Lucinidae
- Genus: Lucina
- Species: L. pensylvanica

Binomial name
- Lucina pensylvanica (Linnaeus, 1758)

Synonyms
- Lucina grandinata Reeve, 1850; Lucina speciosa Reeve, 1850; Lucina virgo Reeve, 1850; Tellina deaurata Röding, 1798; Venus pensylvanica Linnaeus, 1758

= Lucina pensylvanica =

Species of bivalve

Lucina pensylvanica, commonly known as the Pennsylvania lucine, is a species of bivalve mollusc in the family Lucinidae.

== Taxonomy ==
This mollusc was first described in 1758 by the Swedish naturalist Carl Linnaeus, who gave it the name Venus pensylvanica. He spelt the specific name incorrectly, with only a single "n" in the first syllable, but by the law of priority laid down in the International Code of Zoological Nomenclature, the original spelling is retained even if it contained an error. The mollusc has since been reassigned to the genus Lucina, becoming Lucina pensylvanica.

== Description ==
Lucina pensylvanica is nearly circular in shape and grows to a maximum size of about 50 mm (2 in). There is a marked groove on the posterior side of the valves and the concentric sculpturing is somewhat irregular. The valves are largely white, but remnants of the brownish periostracum may remain in the form of calcified scales. These scales contain calcareous granules and have a thin layer of prismatic aragonite on their ventral surfaces, which gives an unusual flexibility to the margin of the valve.

== Distribution ==
Found along the Atlantic coast of North America, ranging from North Carolina to the West Indies.

== Ecology ==
Like other members of the Lucinidae, Lucina pensylvanica possesses chemosymbiotic, sulphur-oxidizing bacteria housed in bacteriocytes in their gills. During periods of starvation in the laboratory, researchers found that Lucina pensylvanica preserved the bacterial symbionts for three months or more, continuing to obtain nutrients from the bacteria which continued their sulphur-oxidizing activities, relying on sulphur stored by the host in granules. This was in contrast to the dwarf tiger lucine Ctena orbiculata which did not retain its symbiotic bacteria during a period of starvation, consuming the bacteria instead.
