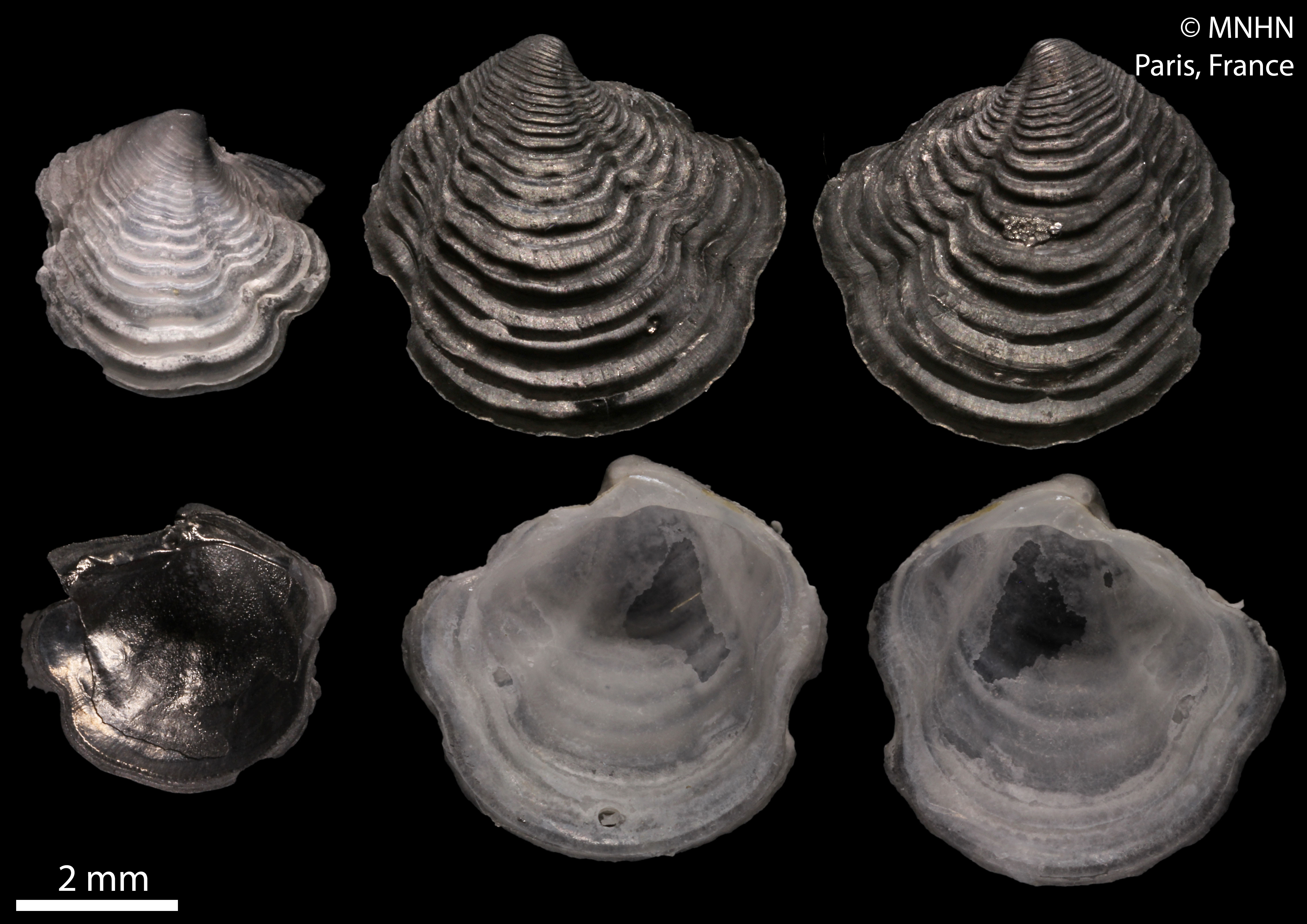
- Shell of Pleurolucina hendersoni (specimen at MNHN, Paris)

Scientific classification
- Domain: Eukaryota
- Kingdom: Animalia
- Phylum: Mollusca
- Class: Bivalvia
- Order: Lucinida
- Superfamily: Lucinoidea
- Family: Lucinidae
- Genus: Pleurolucina; Dall, 1901

Type species
- Lucina leucocyma Dall, 1886

Species
- See text

Synonyms
- † Dallucina Olsson & Harbison, 1953; Lucina (Pleurolucina) Dall, 1901; Phacoides (Pleurolucina) Dall, 1901 (original rank)

= Pleurolucina =

Genus of molluscs

Pleurolucina is a genus of saltwater clams, marine bivalve molluscs in the subfamily Lucininae of the family Lucinidae.

== Species ==
- † Pleurolucina amabilis (Dall, 1898)
- Pleurolucina harperae Glover & J. D. Taylor, 2016
- Pleurolucina hendersoni (Britton, 1972)
- † Pleurolucina imbricolamella (Dockery, 1982)
- Pleurolucina leucocyma (Dall, 1886)
- Pleurolucina leucocymoides (H. N. Lowe, 1935)
- † Pleurolucina quadricostata (Dall, 1903)
- Pleurolucina sombrerensis (Dall, 1886)
- Pleurolucina taylori Coan & Valentich-Scott, 2012
- † Pleurolucina tithonis (Dall, 1903)
- † Pleurolucina triloba (Dockery, 1982)
- Pleurolucina undata (Carpenter, 1865)
