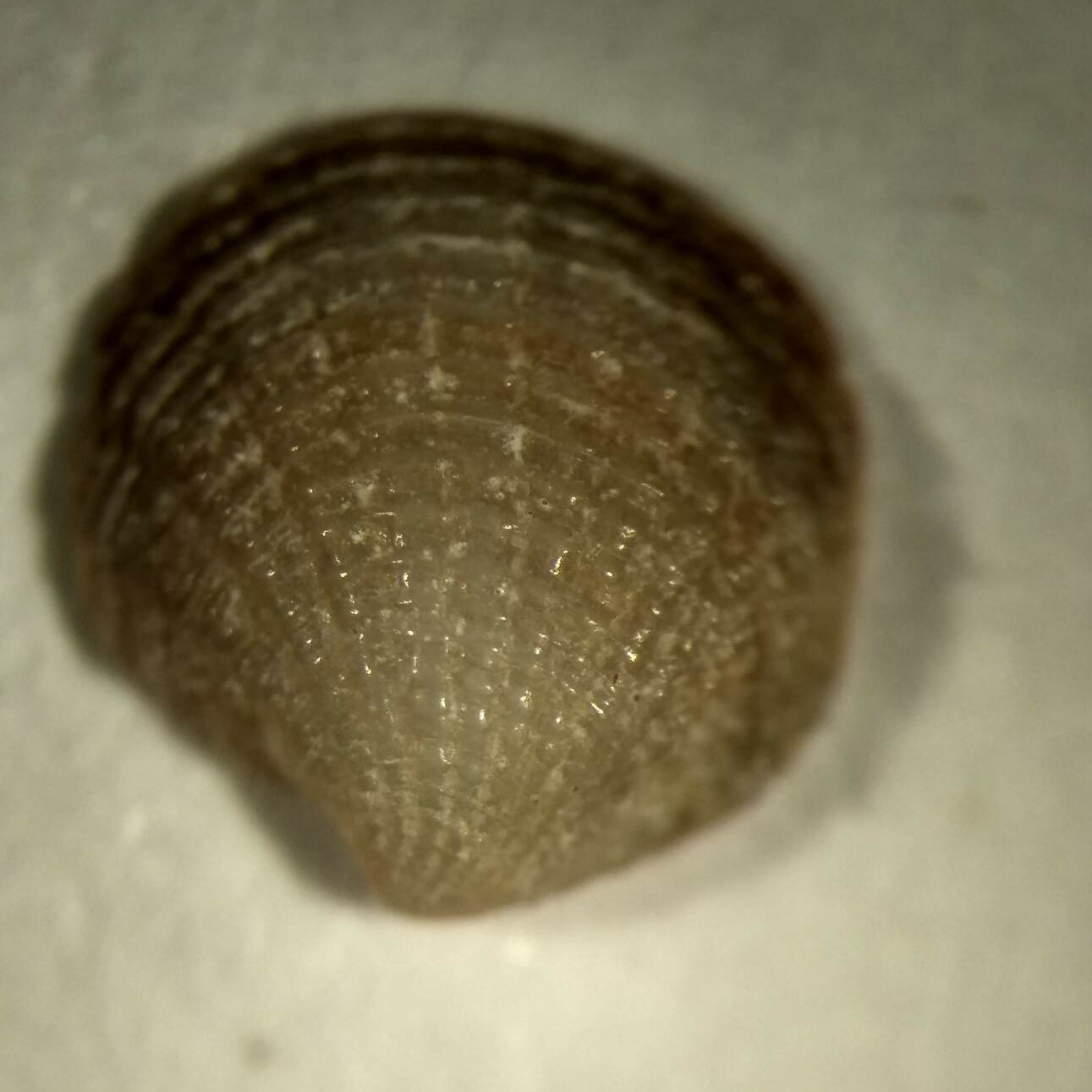
- Radiolucina amianta

Scientific classification
- Domain: Eukaryota
- Kingdom: Animalia
- Phylum: Mollusca
- Class: Bivalvia
- Order: Lucinida
- Superfamily: Lucinoidea
- Family: Lucinidae
- Genus: Radiolucina; Britton, 1972

Type species
- Phacoides (Bellucina) amiantus Dall, 1901

Synonyms
- Parvilucina (Radiolucina) Britton, 1972 (original rank)

= Radiolucina =

Genus of molluscs

Radiolucina is a genus of bivalves belonging to the family Lucinidae.

== Species ==
- Radiolucina amianta (Dall, 1901)
- Radiolucina cancellaris (Philippi, 1846)
- Radiolucina jessicae Garfinkle, 2012
- Radiolucina katherinepalmerae (Weisbord, 1964)
