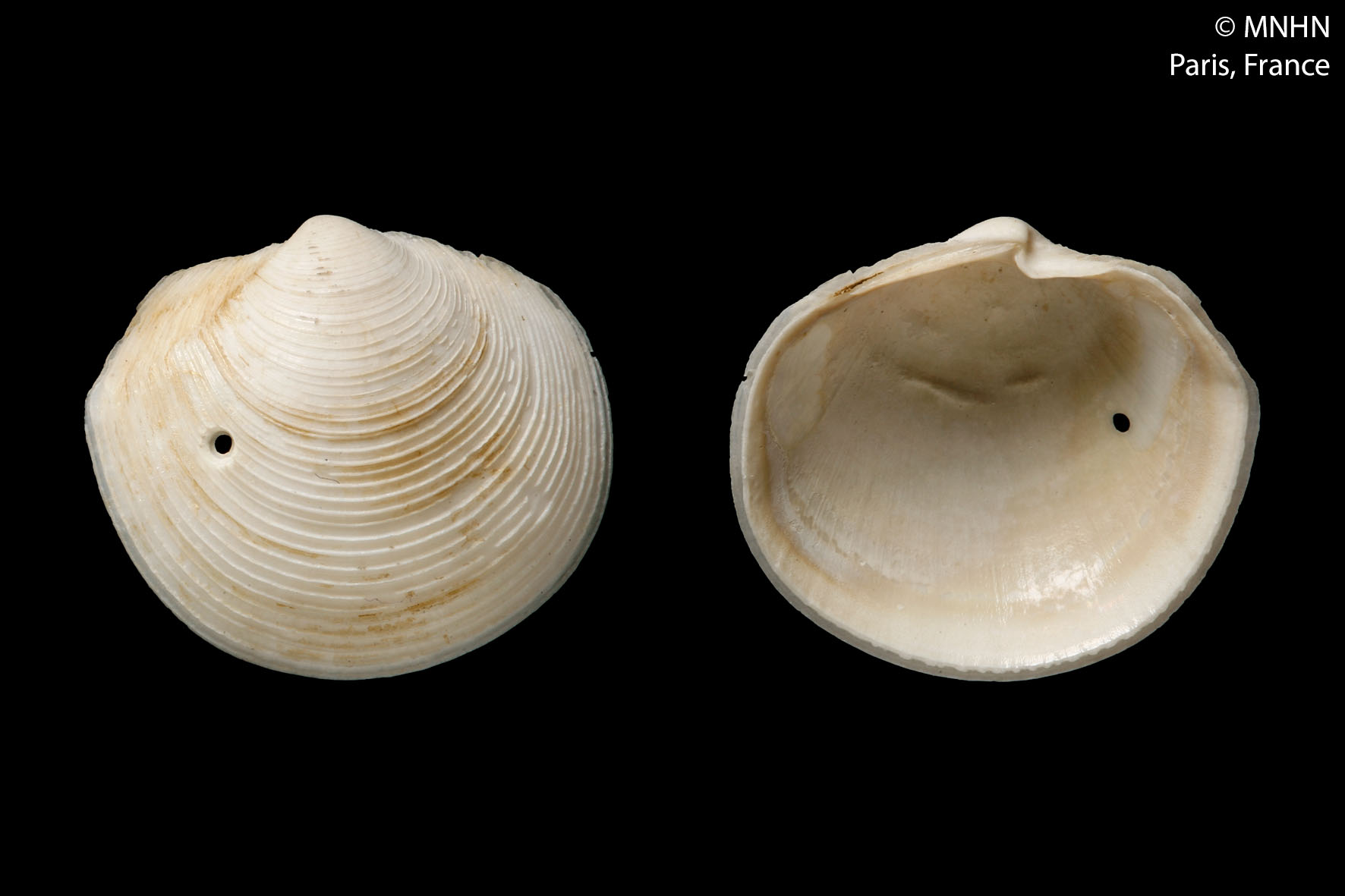
- Shell of Pseudolucinisca kantori (syntype at MNHN, Paris)

Scientific classification
- Domain: Eukaryota
- Kingdom: Animalia
- Phylum: Mollusca
- Class: Bivalvia
- Order: Lucinida
- Superfamily: Lucinoidea
- Family: Lucinidae
- Genus: Pseudolucinisca; Chavan, 1959

Type species
- Lucina lacteola Tate, 1897

Synonyms
- Callucina (Pseudolucinisca) Chavan, 1959 (original rank)

= Pseudolucinisca =

Genus of bivalves

Pseudolucinisca is a genus of bivalves in the subfamily Leucosphaerinae belonging to the family Lucinidae.

== Species ==
- Pseudolucinisca japonica (Habe, 1958)
- Pseudolucinisca kantori Glover & J. D. Taylor, 2016
- Pseudolucinisca lacteola (Tate, 1897)
- Pseudolucinisca wami Glover & J. D. Taylor, 2008
