= Pleurolucina leucocyma =

Scientific classification
- Kingdom: Animalia
- Phylum: Mollusca
- Class: Bivalvia
- Order: Lucinida
- Superfamily: Lucinoidea
- Family: Lucinidae
- Genus: Pleurolucina
- Species: P. leucocyma

Binomial name
- Pleurolucina leucocyma (Dall, 1886)

Synonyms
- Lucina leucocyma Dall, 1886 (original combination)

Species of bivalve

Pleurolucina leucocyma, or the saw-toothed pen shell, is a species of bivalve mollusc in the subfamily Lucininae of the family Lucinidae.

The updated location of this species is now confirmed only to be found in marine areas surrounding Florida and the Gulf of Mexico. Pleurolucina leucocyma's location is commonly confused with its sister species Pleurolucina harperae, which is found in the Caribbean.
