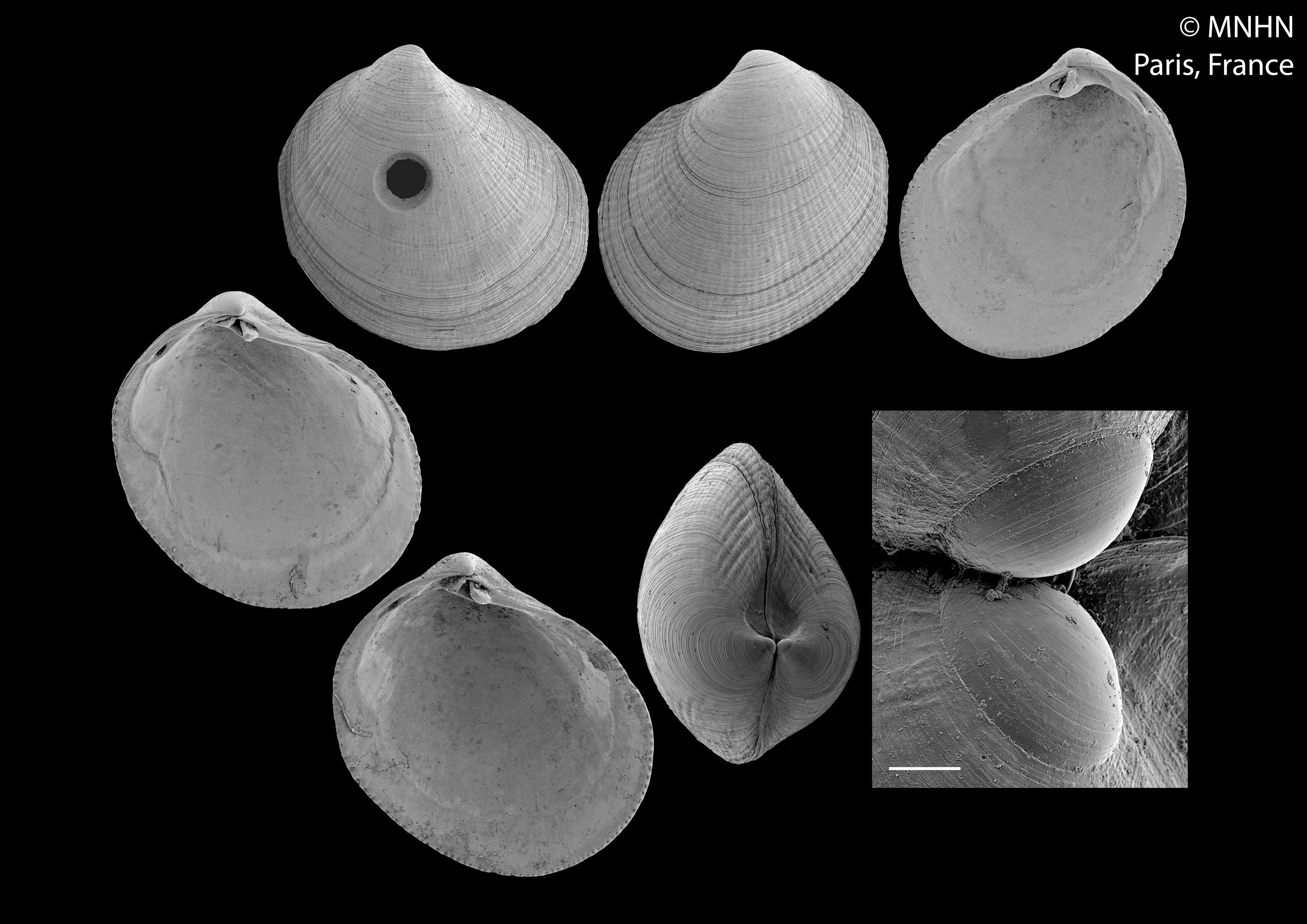
- Shell of Pillucina pacifica (specimen at MNHN, Paris)

Scientific classification
- Kingdom: Animalia
- Phylum: Mollusca
- Class: Bivalvia
- Order: Lucinida
- Family: Lucinidae
- Genus: Pillucina; Pilsbry, 1921

Type species
- Loripes (Pillucina) spaldingi Pilsbry, 1921

Species
- See text

Synonyms
- Loripes (Pillucina) Pilsbry, 1921 (basionym); Sydlorina Iredale, 1930

= Pillucina =

Genus of molluscs

Pillucina is a genus of saltwater clams, marine bivalve molluscs in the subfamily Lucininae of the family Lucinidae.

== Species ==
- Pillucina australis Glover & J. D. Taylor, 2001
- Pillucina copiosa Glover & J. D. Taylor, 2007
- Pillucina hawaiiensis (E. A. Smith, 1885)
- Pillucina maestratii Glover & J. D. Taylor, 2016
- Pillucina mauritiana Glover & J. D. Taylor, 2001
- Pillucina neglecta Habe, 1960
- Pillucina pacifica Glover & J. D. Taylor, 2001
- Pillucina pisidium (Dunker, 1860)
- Pillucina profusa Glover & J. D. Taylor, 2016
- Pillucina symbolica (Iredale, 1930)

Synonyms

- Pillucina angela (Melvill, 1899): synonym of Rugalucina angela (Melvill, 1899)
- Pillucina denticula Glover & J. D. Taylor, 2001: synonym of Pusillolucina denticula (Glover & J. D. Taylor, 2001) (original combination)
- Pillucina pusilla Glover & J. D. Taylor, 2016: synonym of Pusillolucina pusilla (Glover & J. D. Taylor, 2016) (original combination)
- Pillucina spaldingi (Pilsbry, 1921): synonym of Pillucina hawaiiensis (E. A. Smith, 1885) (junior synonym)
- Pillucina vietnamica Zorina, 1978: synonym of Rugalucina vietnamica (Zorina, 1978) (original combination)
