= Stewartia floridana =

Scientific classification
- Kingdom: Animalia
- Phylum: Mollusca
- Class: Bivalvia
- Order: Lucinida
- Family: Lucinidae
- Genus: Stewartia; Olsson, A. & Harbison, A. 1953
- Species: S. floridana

Binomial name
- Stewartia floridana (Conrad, 1833)

Synonyms
- Lucina barbata Reeve, 1850; Lucina floridana Conrad, 1833

Species of bivalve

Stewartia floridana is a bivalve of the family Lucinidae that is chemosymbiotic with sulfur-oxidizing bacteria.

== Distribution ==
This marine species occurs off Florida.
