= Bourdotia (bivalve) =

Scientific classification
- Domain: Eukaryota
- Kingdom: Animalia
- Phylum: Mollusca
- Class: Bivalvia
- Order: Lucinida
- Family: Lucinidae
- Genus: Bourdotia; Dall, 1901

Genus of molluscs

Bourdotia is a genus of bivalves belonging to the family Lucinidae.

The species of this genus are found in Europe.

Species:

- Bourdotia boschorum Dekker & Goud, 1994
- Bourdotia subdivaricata (d'Orbigny, 1850)
- Lucina ermenonvillensis (d'Orbigny, 1850)
