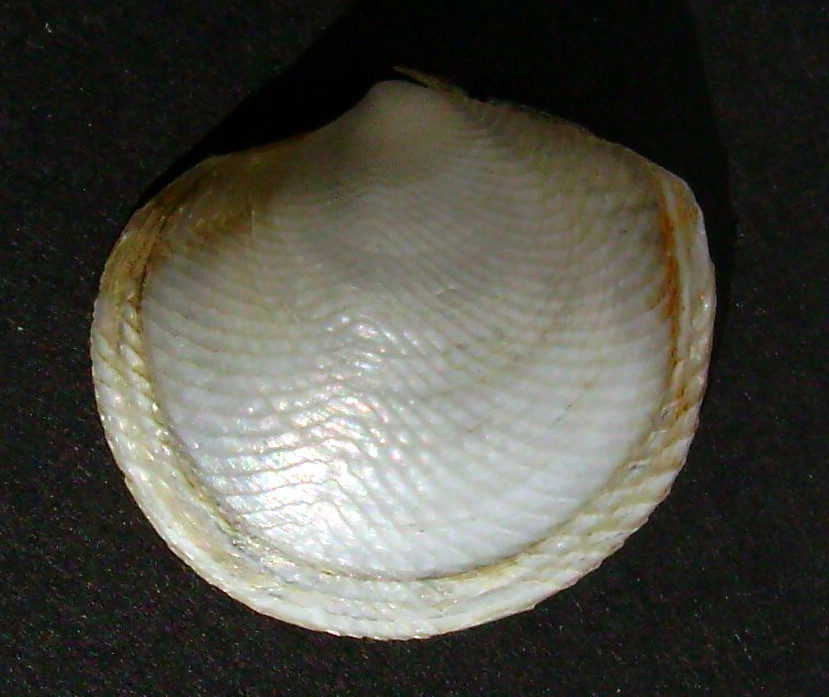
- Divaricella

Scientific classification
- Kingdom: Animalia
- Phylum: Mollusca
- Class: Bivalvia
- Order: Lucinida
- Family: Lucinidae
- Genus: Divaricella; Martens, 1880

= Divaricella =

Genus of molluscs

Divaricella is a genus of bivalves belonging to the family Lucinidae.

The genus has almost cosmopolitan distribution.

== Species ==
Species:

- Divaricella angulifera (Orbigny, 1842)
- Divaricella chavani Cosel, 2006
- Divaricella chipolana (Dall, 1903)
