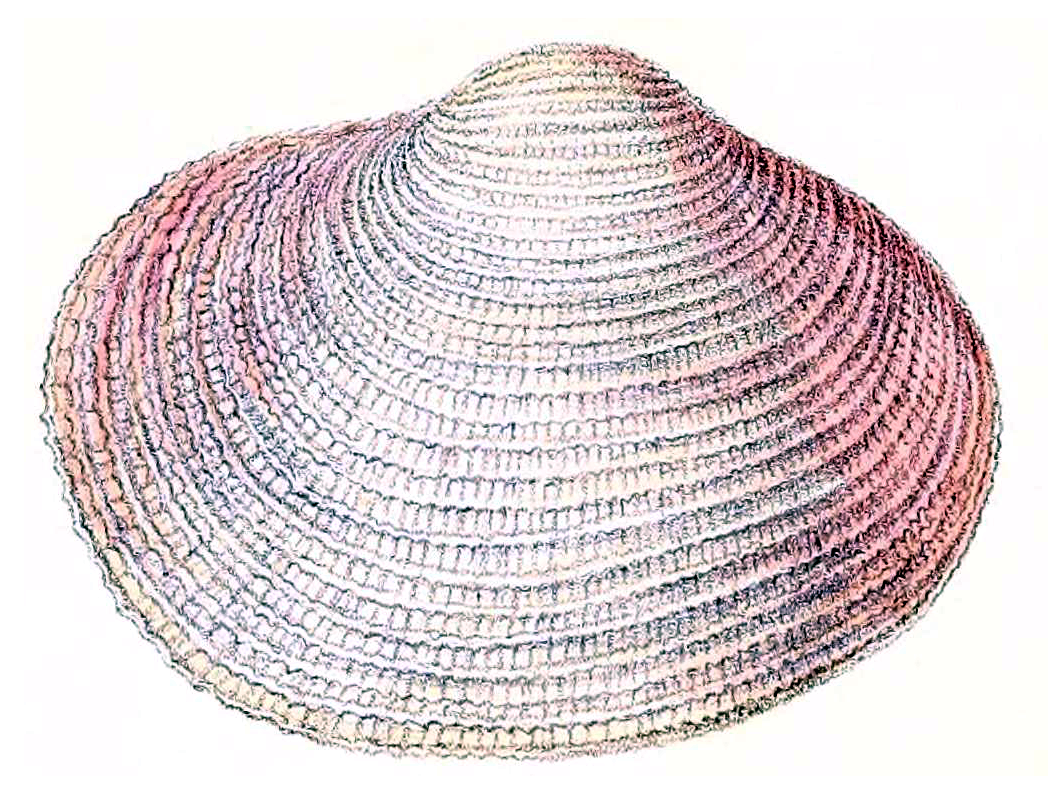
- Fimbria soverbii. Illustration from Conchologia Iconica, or Illustrations of the shells of molluscous animals, Vol. 18, London: L. Reeve and Co., 1873

Scientific classification
- Kingdom: Animalia
- Phylum: Mollusca
- Class: Bivalvia
- Order: Lucinida
- Family: Lucinidae
- Genus: Fimbria; Megerle von Mühlfeld, 1811

Species
- See text

= Fimbria (bivalve) =

Genus of bivalves

Fimbria is a genus of marine bivalve molluscs in the family Lucinidae. Fimbria contains two living species, Fimbria fimbriata and Fimbria soverbii. Several other species are known from fossils.
