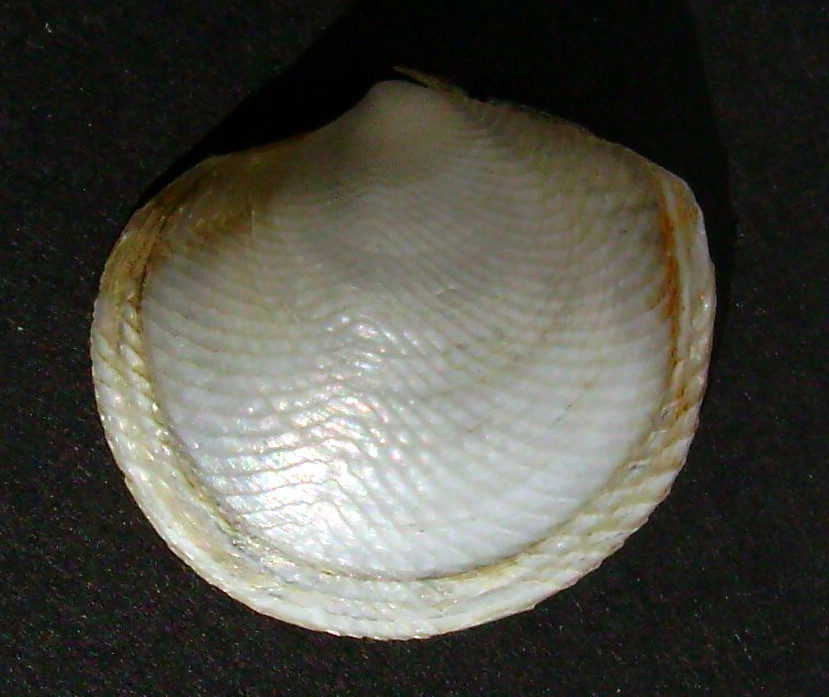
- Divaricella huttoniana

Scientific classification
- Kingdom: Animalia
- Phylum: Mollusca
- Class: Bivalvia
- Order: Lucinida
- Superfamily: Lucinoidea
- Family: Lucinidae; Fleming, 1828

Genera
- See text.

= Lucinidae =

Lucinidae Temporal range: Silurian – Present

Family of bivalves

Lucinidae, common name hatchet shells, is a family of saltwater clams, marine bivalve molluscs.

These bivalves are remarkable for their endosymbiosis with sulphide-oxidizing bacteria.

== Characteristics ==
The members of this family have a worldwide distribution. They are found in muddy sand or gravel at or below low tide mark. But they can also be found at bathyal depths. They have characteristically rounded shells with forward-facing projections. The shell is predominantly white and buff and is often thin-shelled. The shells are equivalve with unequal sides. The umbones (the apical part of each valve) are just anterior to mid-line. The adductor scars are unequal: the anterior are narrower and somewhat longer than the posterior. They are partly or largely separated from the pallial line. The valves are flattened and etched with concentric or radial rings. Each valve bears two cardinal and two plate-like lateral teeth. These molluscs do not have siphons but the extremely long foot makes a channel which is then lined with slime and serves for the intake and expulsion of water. The ligament is external and is often deeply inset. The pallial line lacks a sinus.

== Fossil record ==
An Eocene species Superlucina megameris was the largest lucinid ever recorded, with shell size up to 31.1 centimetres (12.2 in) high, over 28 centimetres (11 in) wide and 8.6 centimetres (3.4 in) thick.

== Symbiosis ==
Lucinids host their sulfur-oxidizing symbionts in specialized gill cells called bacteriocytes. Lucinids are burrowing bivalves that live in environments with sulfide-rich sediments. The bivalve will pump sulfide-rich water over its gills from the inhalant siphon in order to provide symbionts with sulfur and oxygen. The endosymbionts then use these substrates to fix carbon into organic compounds, which are then transferred to the host as nutrients. During periods of starvation, lucinids may harvest and digest their symbionts as food.

Symbionts are acquired via phagocytosis of bacteria by bacterioctyes. Symbiont transmission occurs horizontally, where juvenile lucinids are aposymbiotic and acquire their symbionts from the environment in each generation. Lucinids maintain their symbiont population by reacquiring sulfur-oxidizing bacteria throughout their lifetime. Although process of symbiont acquisition is not entirely characterized, it likely involves the use of the binding protein, codakine, isolated from the lucinid bivalve, Codakia orbicularis. It is also known that symbionts do not replicate within bacteriocytes because of inhibition by the host. However, this mechanism is not well understood.

Lucinid bivalves originated in the Silurian; however, they did not diversify until the late Cretaceous, along with the evolution of seagrass meadows and mangrove swamps. Lucinids were able to colonize these sulfide rich sediments because they already maintained a population of sulfide-oxidizing symbionts. In modern environments, seagrass, lucinid bivalves, and the sulfur-oxidizing symbionts constitute a three-way symbiosis. Because of the lack of oxygen in coastal marine sediments, dense seagrass meadows produce sulfide-rich sediments by trapping organic matter that is later decomposed by sulfate-reducing bacteria. The lucinid-symbiont holobiont removes toxic sulfide from the sediment, and the seagrass roots provide oxygen to the bivalve-symbiont system.

The symbionts from at least two species of lucinid clams, Codakia orbicularis and Loripes lucinalis, are able to fix nitrogen gas into organic nitrogen.

== Genera ==
The following genera are recognised in the family Lucinidae:

Subfamily Codakiinae Iredale, 1937

- Codakia Scopoli, 1777
- Ctena Mörch, 1860
- Divalucina Iredale, 1936
- Epicodakia Iredale, 1930
- Epilucina Dall, 1901
- Lucinoma Dall, 1901

Subfamily Fimbriinae Nicol, 1950

- † Cerkesia Monari, 2003
- † Cyclopellatia Cossmann, 1907
- Fimbria (traditionally placed in the separate family Fimbriidae)
- † Haastina Marwick, 1953
- † Mutiella Stoliczka, 1871
- † Parvicorbis Cossmann, 1892
- † Schafhaeutlia Cossmann, 1897
- † Sphaera J. Sowerby, 1822
- † Sphaeriola Stoliczka, 1871

Subfamily Leucosphaerinae J. D. Taylor & Glover, 2011

- Afrolucina Cosel, 2006
- Alucinoma Habe, 1958
- Anodontia Link, 1807
- Callucina Dall, 1901
- Dulcina Cosel & Bouchet, 2008
- Epidulcina Cosel & Bouchet, 2008
- Gonimyrtea Marwick, 1929
- Leucosphaera Taylor & Glover, 2005
- Minilucina Cosel & Bouchet, 2008
- Myrtina Glover & Taylor, 2007
- Neophysema J. D. Taylor & Glover, 2005
- Opalocina Glover & J. D. Taylor, 2016
- Pseudolucinisca Chavan, 1959
- † Rawya Strougo, 1975
- Tinalucina Cosel, 2006
- Ustalucina J. D. Taylor & Glover, 2021

Subfamily Lucininae J. Fleming, 1828

- Austriella Tenison Woods, 1881
- Barbierella Chavan, 1938
- Bathyaustriella Glover, J. D. Taylor & Rowden, 2004
- Bourdotia Dall, 1901
- Bretskya Glover & Taylor, 2007
- Callucinella Chavan, 1961 †
- Cardiolucina
- Cavilinga Chavan, 1937
- Chavania Glover & J. D. Taylor, 2001
- Clathrolucina J. D. Taylor & Glover, 2013
- Discolucina Glover & J. D. Taylor, 2007
- Divalinga Chavan, 1951
- Divaricella von Martens, 1880
- Easmithia Glover & J. D. Taylor, 2016
- Falsolucinoma Cosel, 2006
- Ferrocina Glover & Taylor, 2007
- Funafutia Glover & J. D. Taylor, 2001
- Gibbolucina Cossmann, 1904
- Guyanella J. D. Taylor & Glover, 2016
- Here Gabb, 1866
- Imparilucina J. D. Taylor & Glover, 2021
- Indoaustriella Glover, J. D. Taylor & S. T. Williams, 2008
- Jallenia Glover & J. D. Taylor, 2016
- Joellina Cosel, 2006
- Keletistes P. G. Oliver, 1986
- Lamellolucina J. D. Taylor & Glover, 2002
- Lamylucina Cosel, 2006
- Lepidolucina Glover & Taylor, 2007
- Liralucina Glover & Taylor, 2007
- Loripes Poli, 1791
- Lucina Bruguière, [1797]
- Lucinella Monterosato, 1883
- Lucinisca Dall, 1901
- Megaxinus Brugnone, 1880
- Nevenulora Iredale, 1930
- Notocina J. D. Taylor & Glover, 2019
- Parvidontia Glover & Taylor, 2007
- Parvilucina Dall, 1901
- † Paslucina Olsson, 1964
- Phacoides Agassiz, 1846
- Pillucina Pilsbry, 1921
- Pleurolucina Dall, 1901
- Plicolucina Glover, J. D. Taylor & Slack-Smith, 2003
- Pompholigina Dall, 1901
- Pusillolucina J. D. Taylor & Glover, 2019
- Radiolucina Britton, 1972
- Rasta J. D. Taylor & Glover, 2000
- Rugalucina J. D. Taylor & Glover, 2019
- Scabrilucina J. D. Taylor & Glover, 2013
- Semelilucina Cosel & Bouchet, 2008
- Stewartia Olsson, A. & Harbison, A. 1953
- Troendleina Cosel & Bouchet, 2008
- Wallucina Iredale, 1930

Subfamily Milthinae Chavan, 1969

- Armimiltha Olsson & Harbison, 1953†
- Eomiltha Cossmann, 1912†
- Miltha H. Adams & A. Adams, 1857
- Milthoidea Marwick, 1931†
- Retrolucina J. D. Taylor & Glover, 2018

Subfamily Monitilorinae J. D. Taylor & Glover, 2011

- Monitilora Iredale, 1930
- Prophetilora Iredale, 1930

Subfamily Myrteinae Chavan, 1969

- Elliptiolucina Cosel & Bouchet, 2008
- Eulopia Dall, 1901
- † Gardnerella Chavan, 1951
- Gloverina Cosel & Bouchet, 2008
- Graecina Cosel, 2006
- Jorgenia J. D. Taylor & Glover, 2009
- Myrtea Turton, 1822
- Notomyrtea Iredale, 1924
- Rostrilucina Cosel & Bouchet, 2008
- Solelucina Glover & Taylor, 2007
- Taylorina Cosel & Bouchet, 2008
- Tellidorella Berry, 1963

Subfamily Pegophyseminae J. D. Taylor & Glover, 2011

- Afrophysema J. D. Taylor & Glover, 2005
- Bythosphaera J. D. Taylor & Glover, 2005
- Cavatidens Iredale, 1930
- Cryptophysema J. D. Taylor & Glover, 2005
- Euanodontia J. D. Taylor & Glover, 2005
- Loripinus Monterosato, 1883
- Meganodontia Bouchet & Cosel, 2004
- Pegophysema Stewart, 1930

Incertae sedis (Subfamily not yet assigned )

- † Amanocina Kiel, 2013
- † Cavilucina P. Fischer, 1887
- † Claibornites Stewart, 1930
- † Cubatea Kiel, 2013
- † Dilora Marwick, 1948
- † Eophysema Stewart, 1930
- † Jagolucina Chavan, 1937
- † Jagonoma Chavan, 1946
- † Luciniola Skeat & Madsen, 1898
- † Mesolinga Chavan, 1951
- † Mesomiltha Chavan, 1938
- † Microloripes Cossmann, 1912
- † Milthona Marwick, 1931
- † Myrteopsis Sacco, 1901
- † Nymphalucina Speden, 1970
- † Pseudomiltha P. Fischer, 1887
- † Pterolucina Chavan, 1942
- † Pteromyrtea Finlay, 1926
- † Saxolucina Stewart, 1930
- † Volupia Defrance, 1829
