= Lucinida =

Scientific classification
- Domain: Eukaryota
- Kingdom: Animalia
- Phylum: Mollusca
- Class: Bivalvia
- Infraclass: Heteroconchia
- Subterclass: Euheterodonta
- Superorder: Imparidentia
- Order: Lucinida; Gray, 1854

Families
- See text

Synonyms
- Lucinoida

Order of bivalves

Lucinida (formerly Lucinoida) is a taxonomic order of saltwater clams, marine bivalve molluscs.

== Families ==
In 2010, a new proposed classification system for the Bivalvia was published in by Bieler, Carter & Coan, revising the classification of the Bivalvia. Lucinoida (now Lucinida) thus became an order of its own. It includes the following two superfamilies:

- Superfamily: Lucinoidea
  - Family: Lucinidae
  - Family: †Mactromyidae
  - Family: †Paracyclidae
- Superfamily: Thyasiroidea
  - Family: Thyasiridae
