= Ascetoaxinus quatsinoensis =

Scientific classification
- Kingdom: Animalia
- Phylum: Mollusca
- Class: Bivalvia
- Order: Lucinida
- Family: Thyasiridae
- Genus: Ascetoaxinus
- Species: A. quatsinoensis

Binomial name
- Ascetoaxinus quatsinoensis Oliver and Frey, 2014

Species of bivalve

Ascetoaxinus quatsinoensis is a species of saltwater clam, a bivalve mollusc in the family Thyasiridae. The shell of this species is unusual in that it has a lunule with scalloped edges.

The species was first described by Graham Oliver of the National Museum of Wales and Melissa Frey, curator of invertebrates at the Royal BC Museum.

The type specimen acquired by the Royal BC Museum was collected from Quatsino Sound, Vancouver Island, British Columbia, Canada.
