= T. gouldii =

T. gouldii may refer to:

- Tellina gouldii, Hanley, 1846, the cuneate tellin, a marine bivalve species in the genus Tellina
- Thyasira gouldii, Philippi, 1845, a bivalve species in the genus Thyasira and the family Thyasiridae

== See also ==
- Gouldii (disambiguation)
