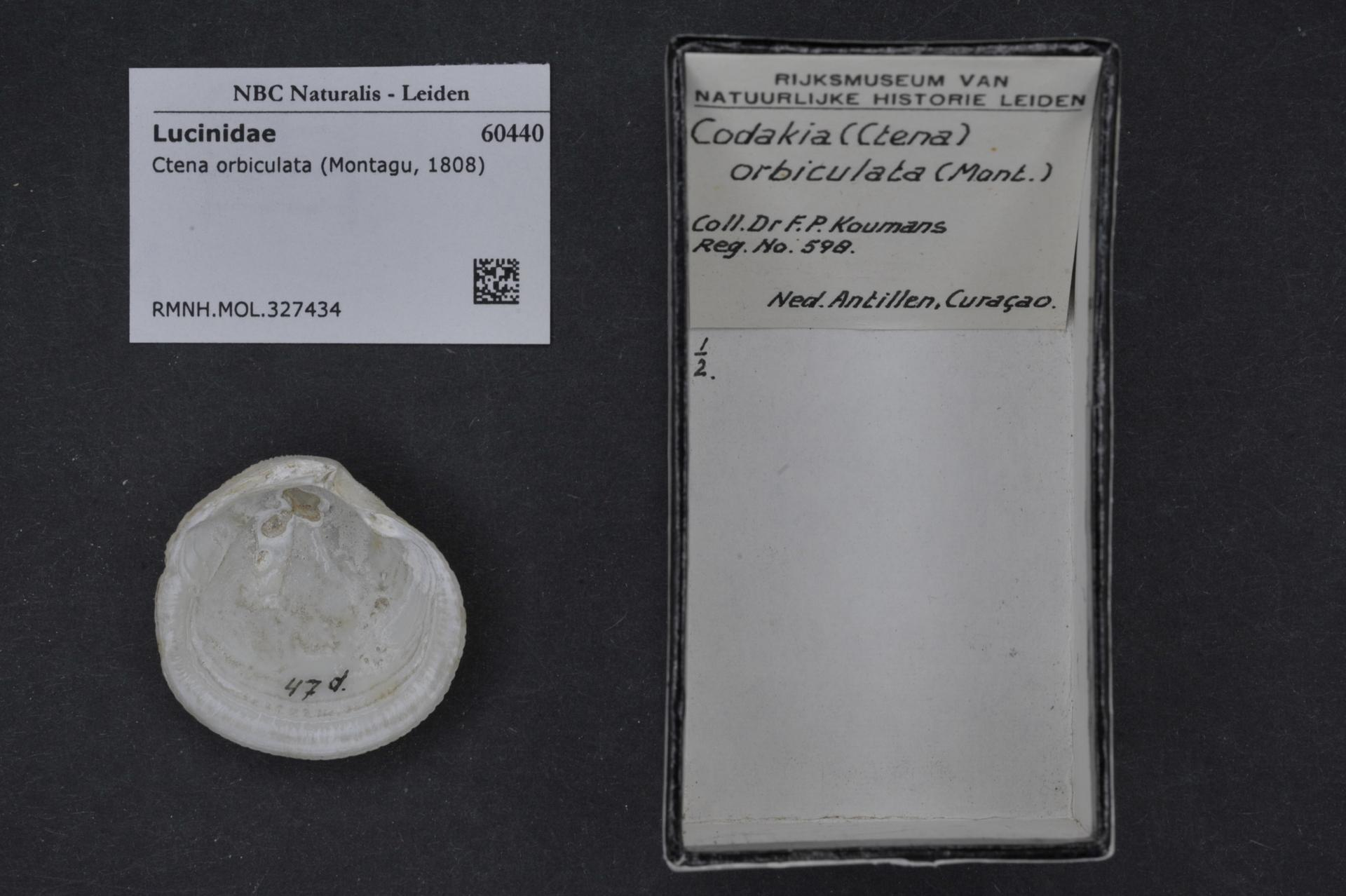
- Preserved specimen of Ctena orbiculata

Conservation status
- Secure (NatureServe)

Scientific classification
- Kingdom: Animalia
- Phylum: Mollusca
- Class: Bivalvia
- Order: Lucinida
- Superfamily: Lucinoidea
- Family: Lucinidae
- Genus: Ctena
- Species: C. orbiculata

Binomial name
- Ctena orbiculata (Montagu, 1808)

Synonyms
- Codakia orbiculata (Montagu, 1808); Jagonia orbiculata (Montagu, 1808); Venus orbiculata Montagu, 1808

= Ctena orbiculata =

Species of bivalve

Ctena orbiculata, commonly known as the dwarf tiger lucine, is a species of bivalve mollusc in the family Lucinidae. It can be found along the Atlantic coast of North America, ranging from North Carolina to the West Indies.

== Description ==
Ctena orbiculata grows to maximum length of 25 mm (1 in). The shell valves are nearly circular, the outer surface being sculptured with fine concentric rings and rather coarser radial lines. The lunule is elongate. The valves can be white, pale yellow or pale orange, but the interior is never pinkish. The shell is more inflated than that of the rather larger tiger lucine (Codakia orbicularis). Like other members of its family Lucinidae, Ctena orbiculata does not have an inhalant siphon, instead rolling its elongated foot into a mucus-lined tube and drawing water into the gill cavity through this. It does have an exhalant siphon which is formed from a highly extensible mantle flap and can be inverted and drawn back into the shell.

== Distribution and habitat ==
Ctena orbiculata is native to the western Atlantic Ocean where its range extends from North Carolina to the Caribbean Sea. It lives immersed in soft sediment on the seabed. Its maximum depth is 183 m (600 ft).

== Ecology ==
Ctena orbiculata is present in large quantities in the sediments associated with turtlegrass, Thalassia testudinum, in Bermuda. The gills of the mollusc contain symbiotic bacteria able to oxidise sulphur. These chemoautotrophic bacteria use the energy released by the oxidation of sulphur compounds to fix carbon dioxide and convert the products into more complex organic molecules which become available to the mollusc. Oxygen-containing water is drawn into the mollusc's gills where the sulphide present in the sediment can be oxidised to non-toxic thiosulphate. The bacteria use oxygen or the nitrate present in the water as an electron acceptor, and oxidise thiosulphate further. This symbiotic arrangement may have allowed bivalves such as Ctena orbiculata to colonise sediments not suited to other organisms.

During periods of starvation in the laboratory, Ctena orbiculata soon consumes the bacterial symbionts in its gill chambers. On release into Thalassia testudinum seagrass beds, the molluscs quickly reacquires the bacteria from the environment.
