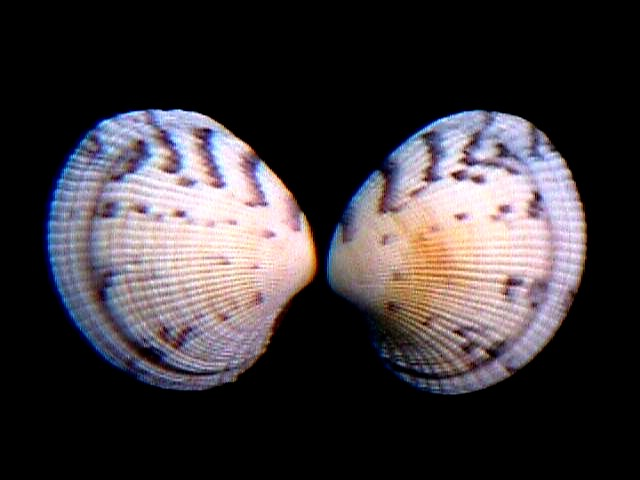

Scientific classification
- Kingdom: Animalia
- Phylum: Mollusca
- Class: Bivalvia
- Order: Lucinida
- Superfamily: Lucinoidea
- Family: Lucinidae
- Genus: Codakia
- Species: C. orbicularis

Binomial name
- Codakia orbicularis (Linnaeus, 1758)

Synonyms
- Chama codak Scopoli, 1777; Semele warburtoni Tenison Woods, 1877 (junior synonym); Venus orbicularis Linnaeus, 1758

= Codakia orbicularis =

Species of bivalve

Codakia orbicularis, or the tiger lucine, is a species of bivalve mollusc in the family Lucinidae. It can be found along the Atlantic coast of North America, ranging from Florida to the West Indies.

== Description ==
Codakia orbicularis grows to maximum length of about 85 mm (3.3 in). The shell valves are nearly circular, the outer surface being sculptured with fine concentric rings and closely-packed radial lines. The lunule, a depressed area near the hinge, is heart-shaped, with the right valve lunule being larger than the left. The periostracum, a thin outside layer, is brown and the valves are mainly white; there is often a pinkish tinge near the interior margin. The shell is more laterally compressed than the smaller dwarf tiger lucine (Ctena orbiculata). Like other members of its family Lucinidae, Codakia orbicularis does not have an inhalant siphon, instead rolling its elongated foot into a mucus-lined tube and drawing water into the gill cavity through this. It does have an exhalant siphon which is formed from a highly extensible mantle flap and can be inverted and drawn back into the shell. The gill cavity contains chemosymbiotic sulphur-oxidizing bacteria housed in bacteriocytes which contribute to the clam's nutritional requirements.

== Distribution and habitat ==
Codakia orbicularis is native to the western Atlantic Ocean where its range includes from Florida and the northern coast of the Caribbean Sea. It lives immersed in soft sediment on the seabed, typically in Thalassia testudinum seagrass beds. Its maximum depth is 93 m (305 ft). The bacterial symbionts enable these burrowing bivalves to colonise sulfide-rich sediments with low oxygen levels that are unsuited to many other bivalves.

== Ecology ==
Codakia orbicularis is a large edible shellfish and its life cycle has been studied to see whether it is suitable for mariculture. In the Bahamas, spawning takes place between May and October. The large-yolked eggs are enclosed in a thick gelatinous membrane and the early developmental stages take place inside this capsule. The later stages of the veliger larva are planktonic and metamorphosis occurs about 16 days after fertilisation. During their growth and development, the larvae may obtain nutrition from the symbiotic chemosynthetic bacteria present in their tissues.
