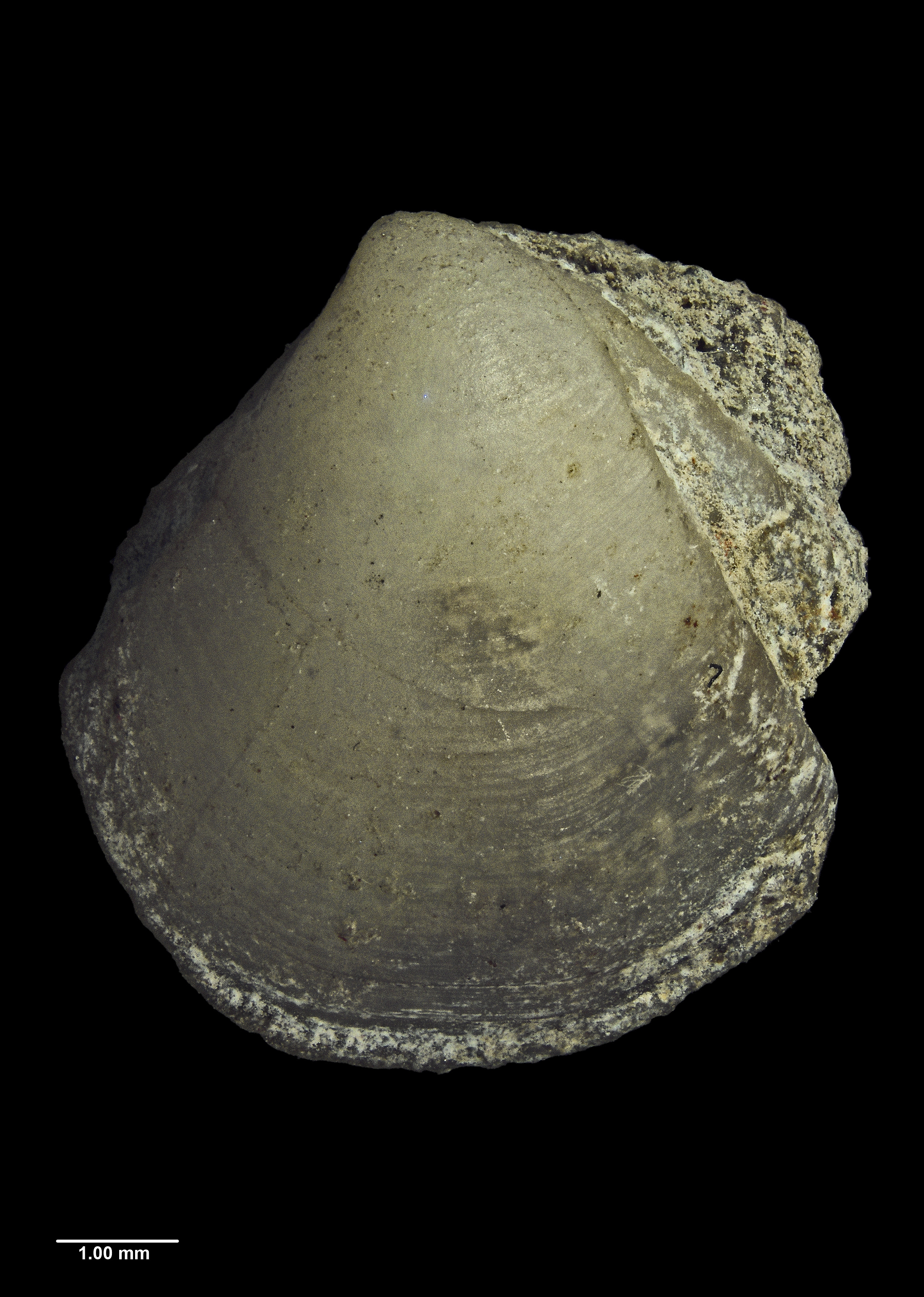
- Holotype from Auckland War Memorial Museum

Scientific classification
- Kingdom: Animalia
- Phylum: Mollusca
- Class: Bivalvia
- Order: Lucinida
- Family: Thyasiridae
- Genus: Thyasira
- Species: †T. motutaraensis

Binomial name
- †Thyasira motutaraensis A. W. B. Powell, 1935

Synonyms
- Thyasira (Prothyasira) motutaraensis A. W. B. Powell, 1935; Thyasira (Thyasira) motutaraensis (A. W. B. Powell, 1935)

= Thyasira motutaraensis =

Thyasira motutaraensis Temporal range: early Miocene

Extinct species of gastropod

Thyasira motutaraensis is an extinct species of bivalve, a marine mollusc, in the family Thyasiridae. Fossils of the species date to early Miocene strata of the west coast of the Auckland Region, New Zealand.

== Description ==
In the original description, Powell described the species as follows:

Shell small, triangulate, higher than wide, equivalve, moderately inflated and almost equilateral. Beaks about central, small, directed forwards and incurved at tips. Anterior end sharply descending, slightly concave, with a moderately long shallowly excavated lunule which is margined by a furrow running from near the beaks to the margin. On the posterior end there are two strong, slightly divergent furrows which are close to the posterior dorsal margin and extend from near the beaks to the margin. The ridges associated with these furrows are angular on their upper edges. Basal margin convex. Surface smooth except for microscopic concentric growth lines.

The holotype of the species measures 7.4 mm (0.29 in) in height, 6.5 mm (0.26 in) in width, and has a thickness of 4.75 mm (0.187 in) when measuring both valves. The species can be differentiated from T. marwicki due to being higher than it is more, more angular when viewed from above, being almost equilateral, and by having an extra radial furrow bordering its lunule, and from T. bartrumi due to its having a less lunule and by having a furrow border.

== Taxonomy ==
The species was first described by A. W. B. Powell in 1935 as Thyasira (Prothyasira) motutaraensis. Its currently accepted name is Thyasira motutaraensis, without a subgenus. The holotype was collected at an unknown date prior to 1935 from between Powell Bay and Bartrum Bay, approximately 2 km (1.2 mi) south of Muriwai, Auckland Region (then more commonly known as Motutara), and is held in the collections of Auckland War Memorial Museum.

== Distribution ==
This extinct marine species occurs in early Miocene strata of the Nihotupu Formation of New Zealand, on the west coast of the Waitākere Ranges of the Auckland Region, New Zealand. The Powell Bay site deposits of the Nihotupu Formation in the western Waitākere Ranges are mid-bathyal 800–2,000 m (2,600–6,600 ft).

== Gallery ==
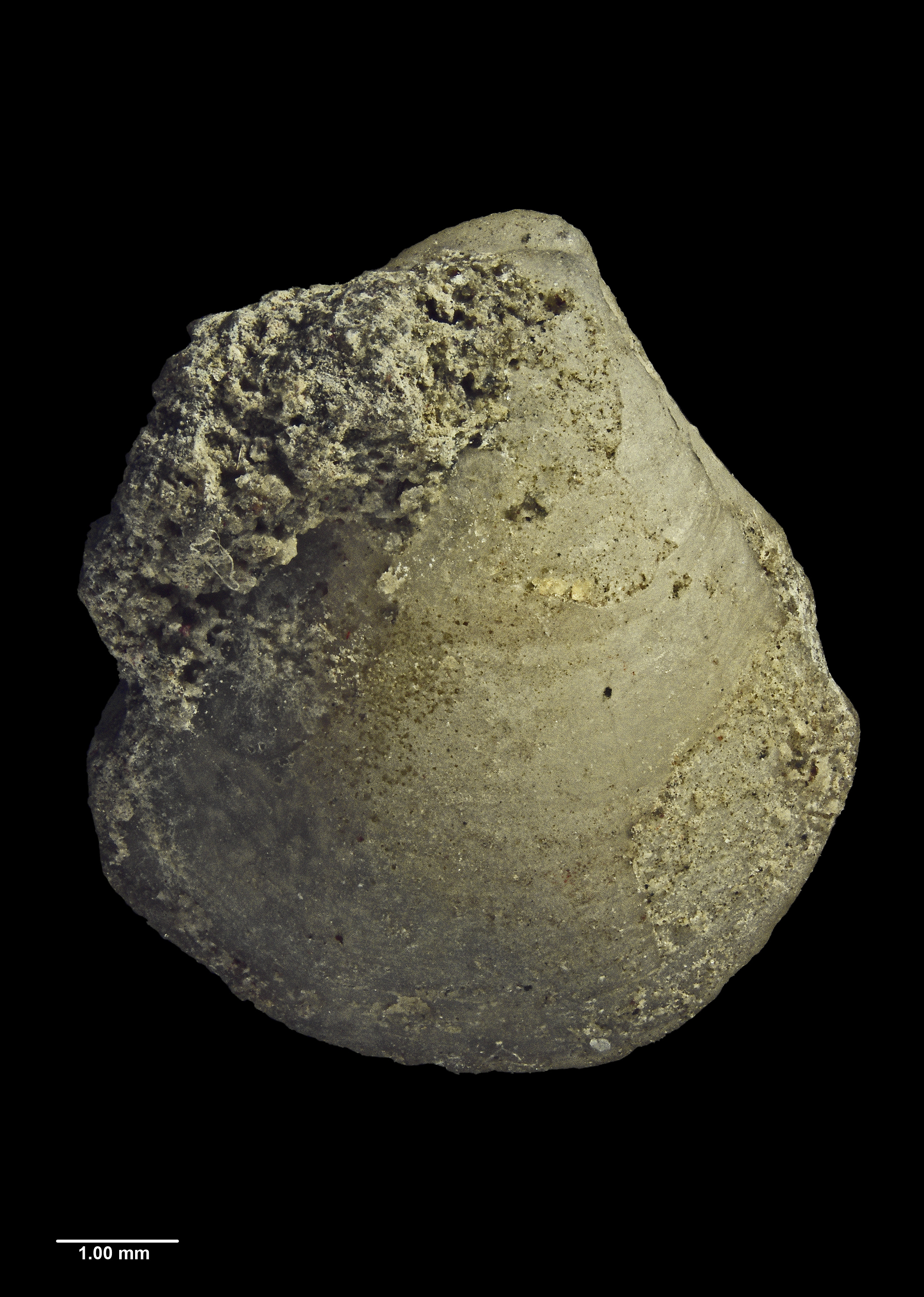
Opposite valve of holotype

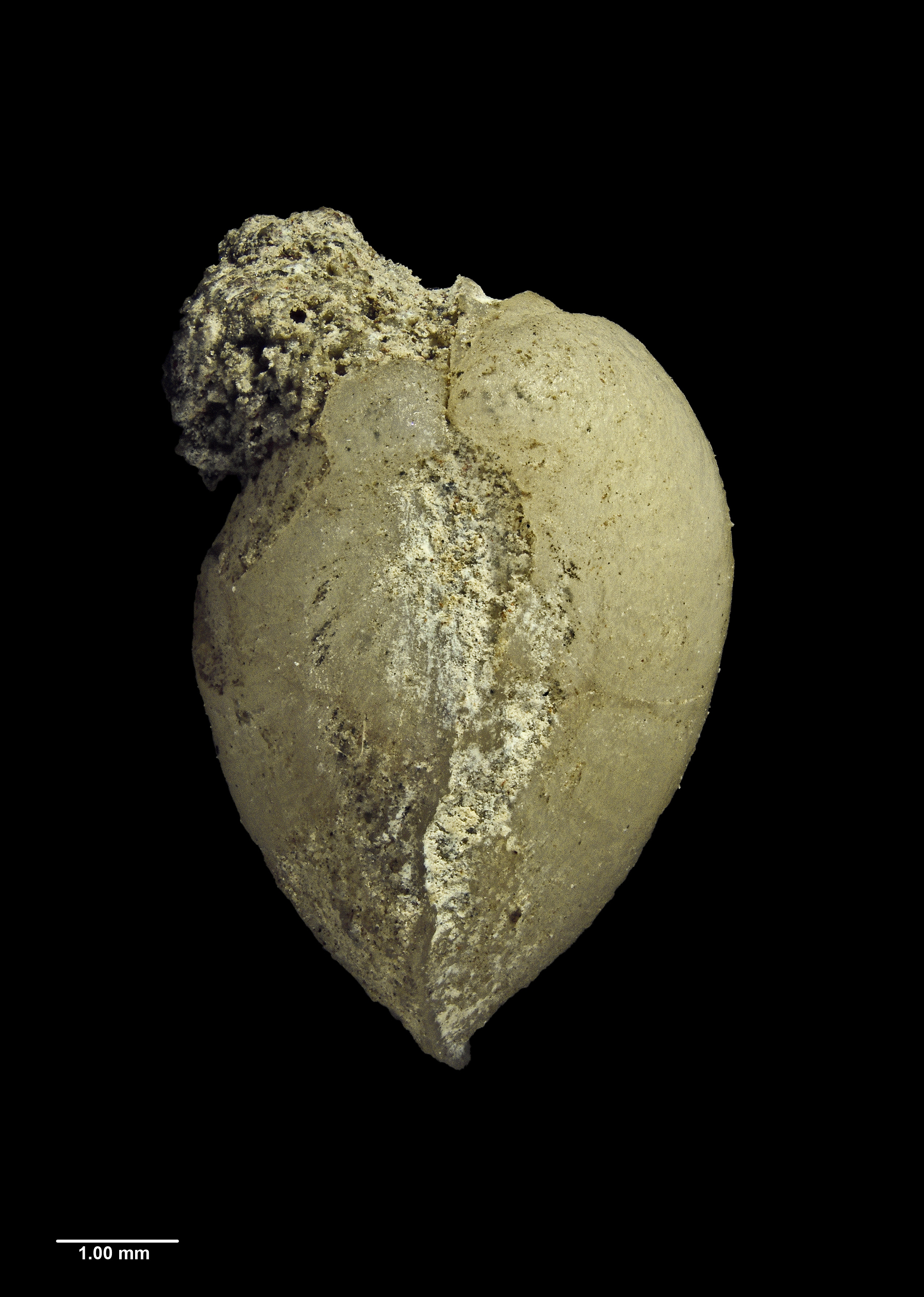
Side view of holotype

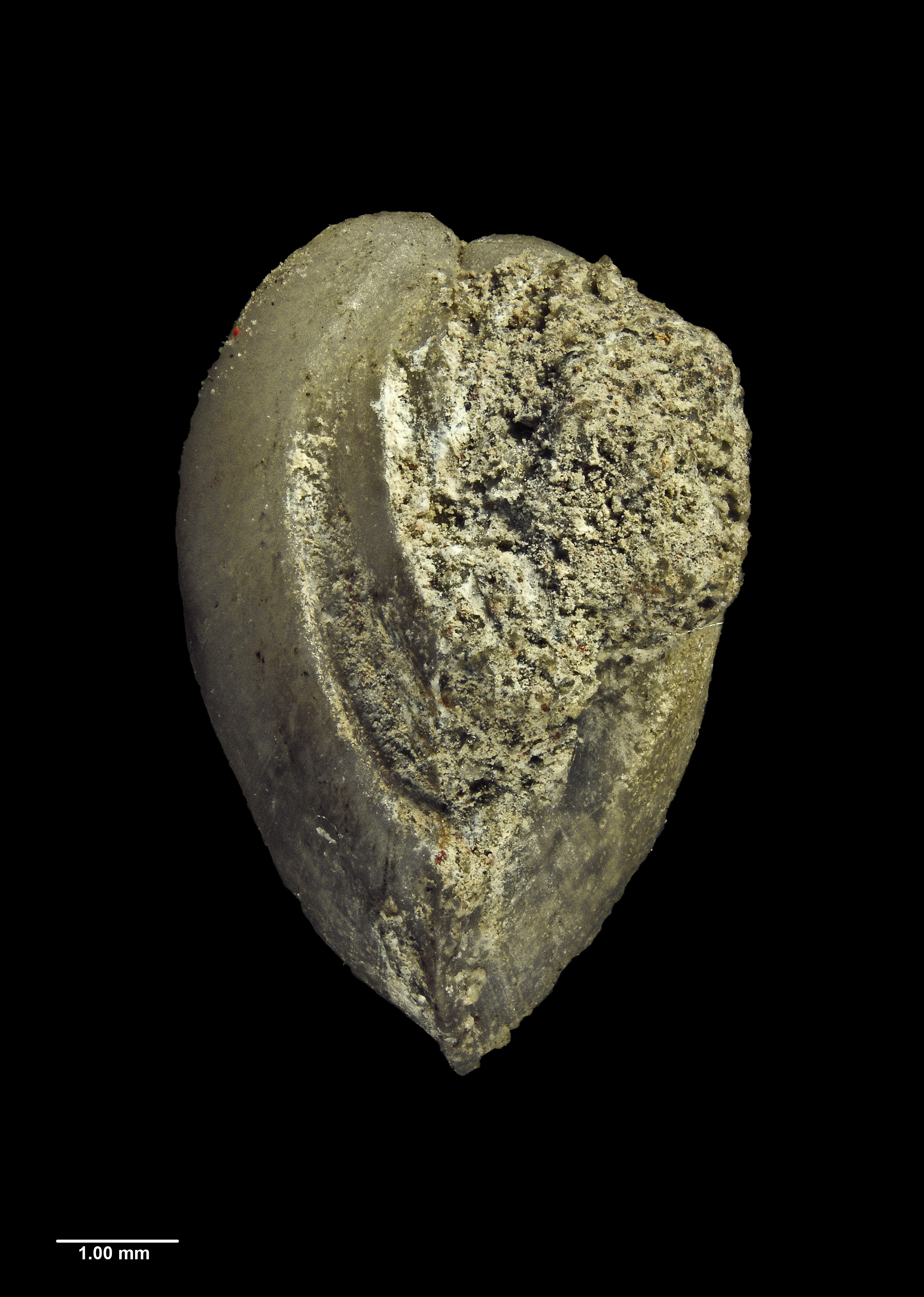
Side view of holotype
