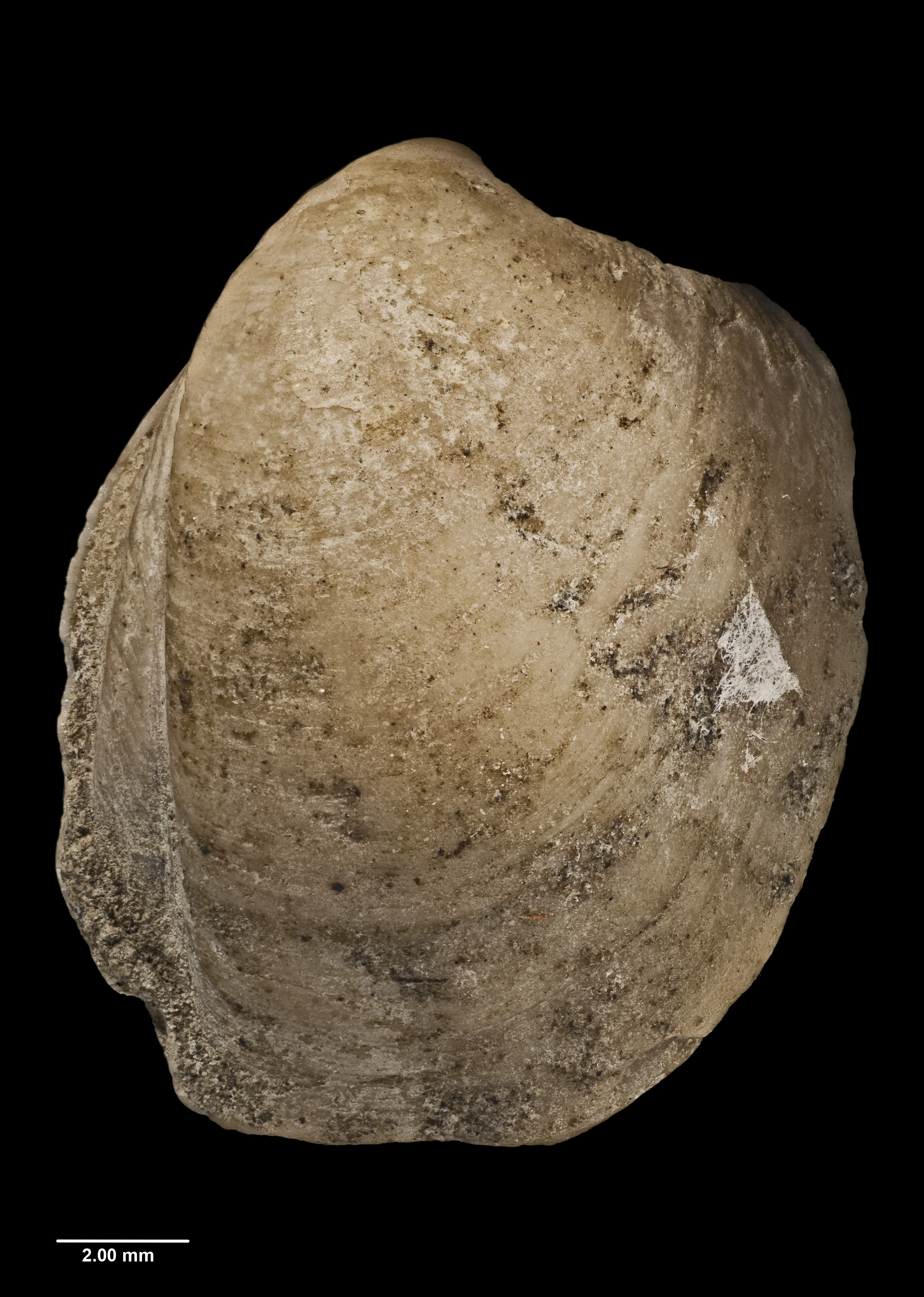
- Holotype from Auckland War Memorial Museum

Scientific classification
- Kingdom: Animalia
- Phylum: Mollusca
- Class: Bivalvia
- Order: Lucinida
- Family: Thyasiridae
- Genus: Thyasira
- Species: †T. bartrumi

Binomial name
- †Thyasira bartrumi A. W. B. Powell, 1935

Synonyms
- Thyasira (Prothyasira) bartrumi A. W. B. Powell, 1935; Thyasira (Thyasira) bartrumi (A. W. B. Powell, 1935)

= Thyasira bartrumi =

Thyasira bartrumi Temporal range: early Miocene

Extinct species of gastropod

Thyasira bartrumi is an extinct species of bivalve, a marine mollusc in the family Thyasiridae. Fossils of the species date to early Miocene strata of the west coast of the Auckland Region, New Zealand.

== Description ==
In the original description, Powell described the species as follows:

Shell of moderate size, thin, very oblique and inequilateral, equivalve and inflated. Beaks at about anterior seventh, small, directed forwards and incurved at tips. Anterior end short, with a large, deeply excavated lunule which extends from just below the beaks to the angle with the ventral margin. The greatly produced posterior end has two deep arcuate furrows bordering the dorsal slope, and a very broad but only slightly raised medial fold which runs from the beaks to behind the anterior fourth on the ventral margin. Surface smooth except for regular microscopic concentric lines of growth. Interior not accessible in any of the specimens.

The holotype of the species measures 15 mm (0.59 in) in height and width, and has a diameter of 10.75 mm (0.423 in) when measuring both valves. The species can be differentiated from T. marwicki and T. motutaraensis due to its more deeply excavated lunule, by not being bordered by a furrow, and its very oblique outline.

== Taxonomy ==
The species was first described by A. W. B. Powell in 1935 as Thyasira (Prothyasira) bartrumi. Its currently accepted name is Thyasira bartrumi, without a subgenus. The holotype was collected at an unknown date prior to 1935 from between Powell Bay and Bartrum Bay, approximately 2 km (1.2 mi) south of Muriwai, Auckland Region (then more commonly known as Motutara), and is held in the collections of Auckland War Memorial Museum.

In 2020, palaeontologists Steffen Kiel, Yolanda Aguilar and Tomoki Kase suggested that the fossil species may belong to the genus Channelaxinus, due to morphological similarities.

== Distribution ==
This extinct marine species occurs in early Miocene strata of the Nihotupu Formation of New Zealand, on the west coast of the Waitākere Ranges of the Auckland Region, New Zealand.

== Gallery ==
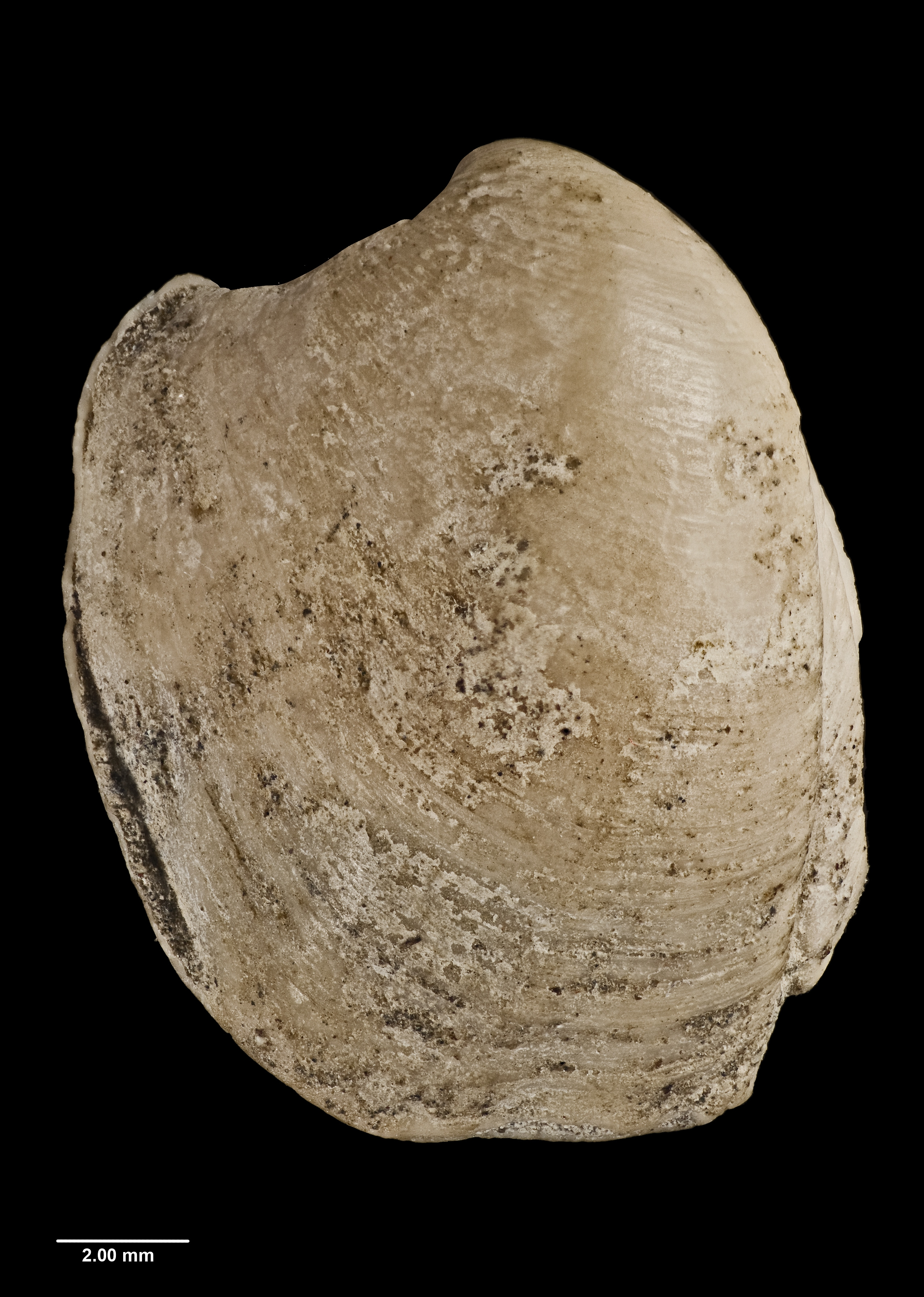
Opposite valve of holotype

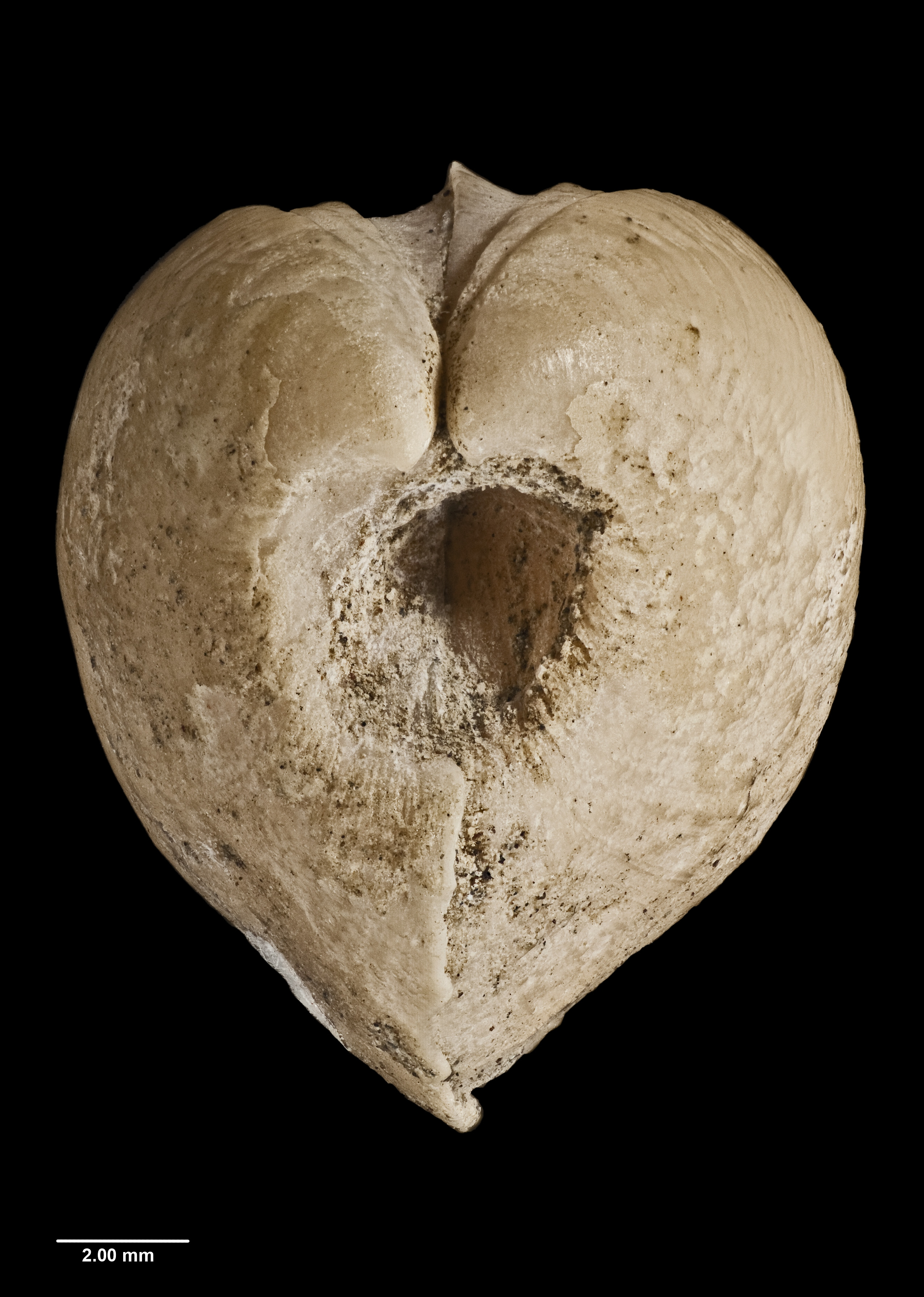
Side view of holotype

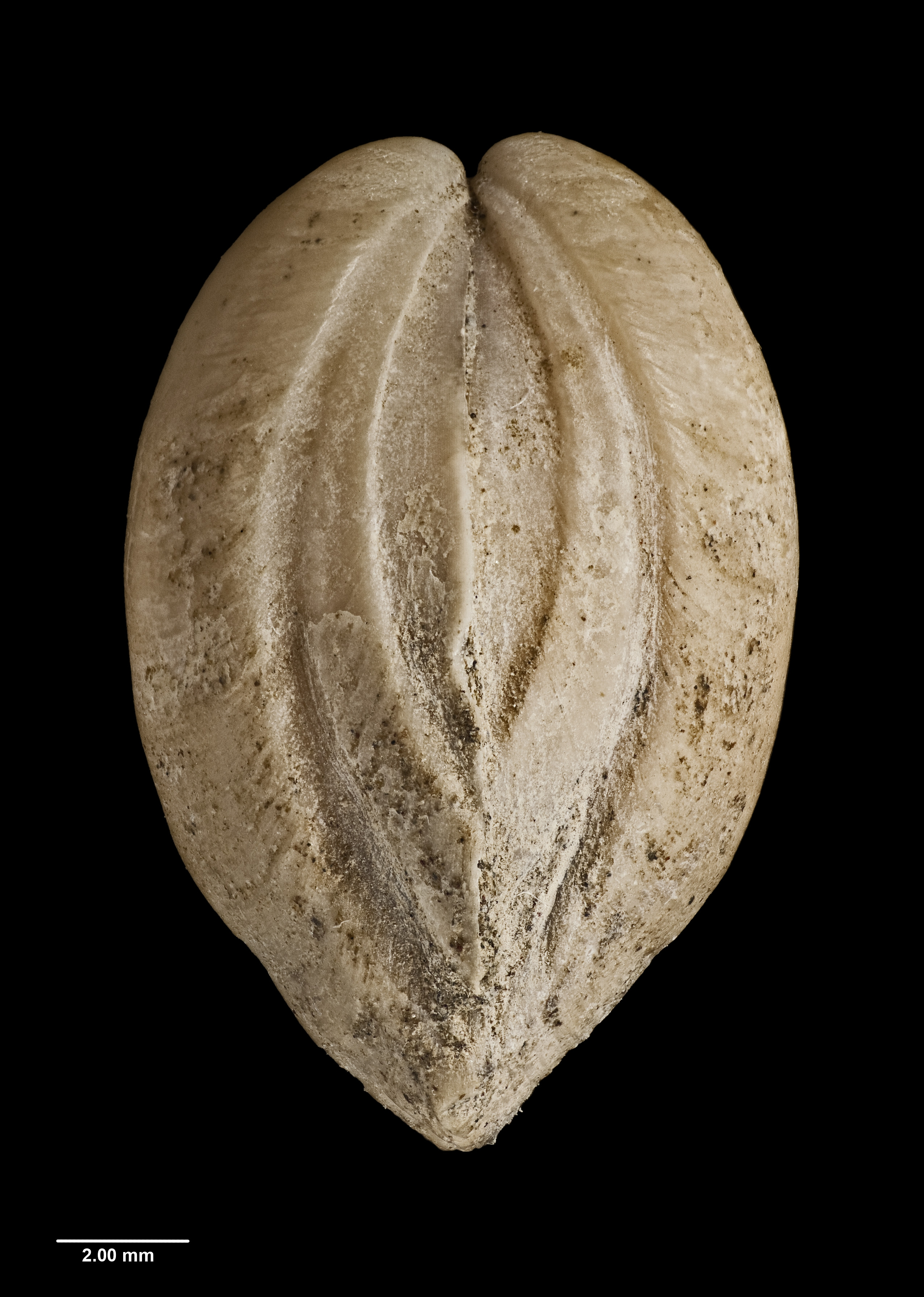
Side view of holotype
