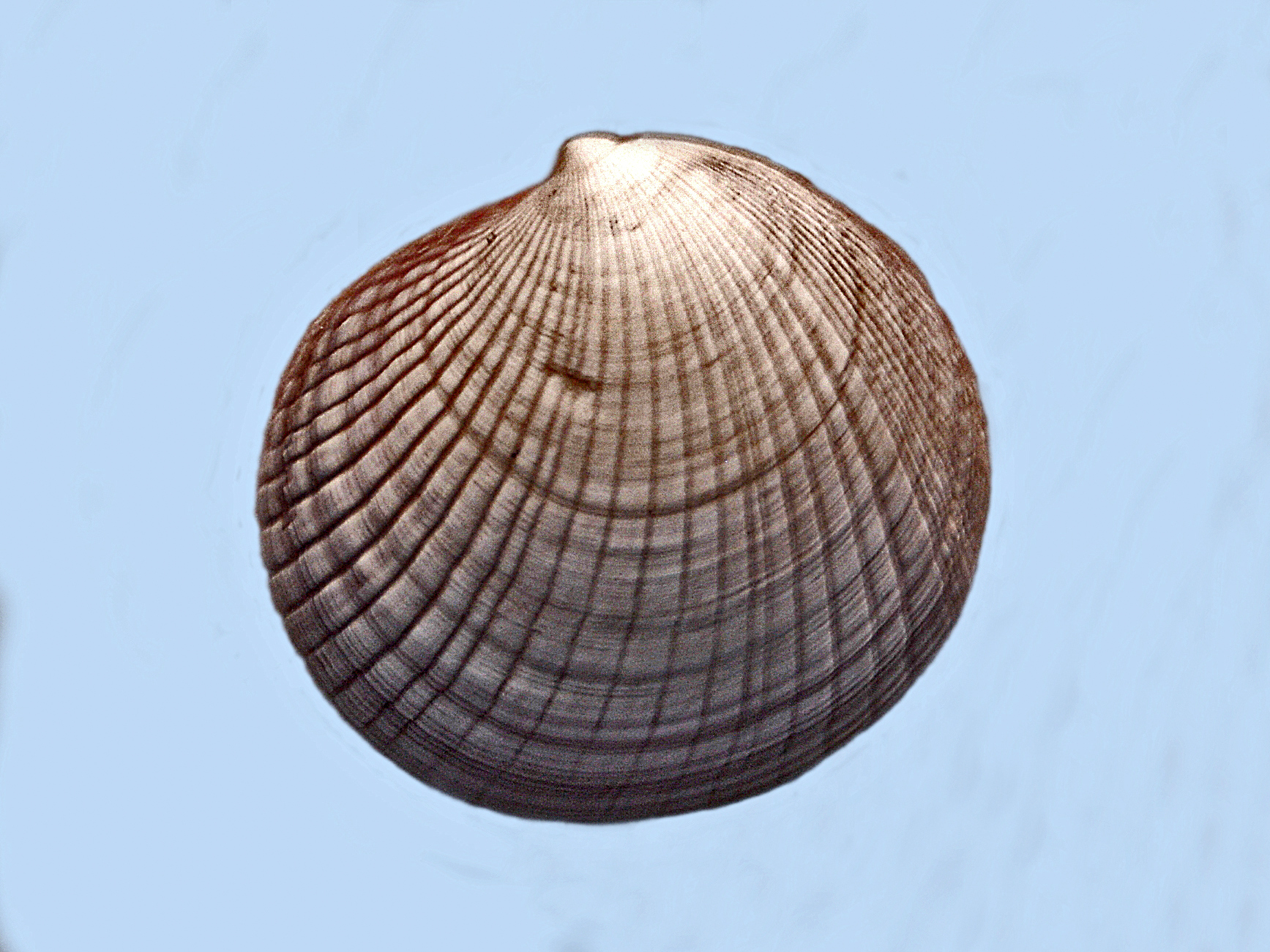
- Valve of Codakia punctata

Scientific classification
- Kingdom: Animalia
- Phylum: Mollusca
- Class: Bivalvia
- Order: Lucinida
- Family: Lucinidae
- Genus: Codakia; Scopoli, 1777

Species
- See text

= Codakia =

Genus of bivalves

Codakia is a genus of saltwater clams, marine bivalve molluscs in the family Lucinidae.

== Species ==
Species within the genus Codakia include:

- Codakia californica T. A. Conrad, 1837
- Codakia costata d'Orbigny, 1842
- Codakia cubana W. H. Dall, 1901
- Codakia distinguenda G. W. Tryon, 1872
- Codakia exasperata L. A. Reeve, 1850
- Codakia filiata W. H. Dall, 1901
- Codakia golikovi Zorina, 1978
- Codakia interrupta J. B. Lamarck, 1816
- Codakia minuata Deshayes, 1863
- Codakia orbicularis C. Linnaeus, 1758
- Codakia paytenorum T. Iredale, 1927
- Codakia pectinella C. B. Adams, 1852
- Codakia perobliqua R. Tate, 1892
- Codakia punctata C. Linnaeus, 1758
- Codakia reevei G. P. Deshayes, 1863
- Codakia rufigera L. A. Reeve, 1835
- Codakia tigerina C. Linnaeus, 1758
