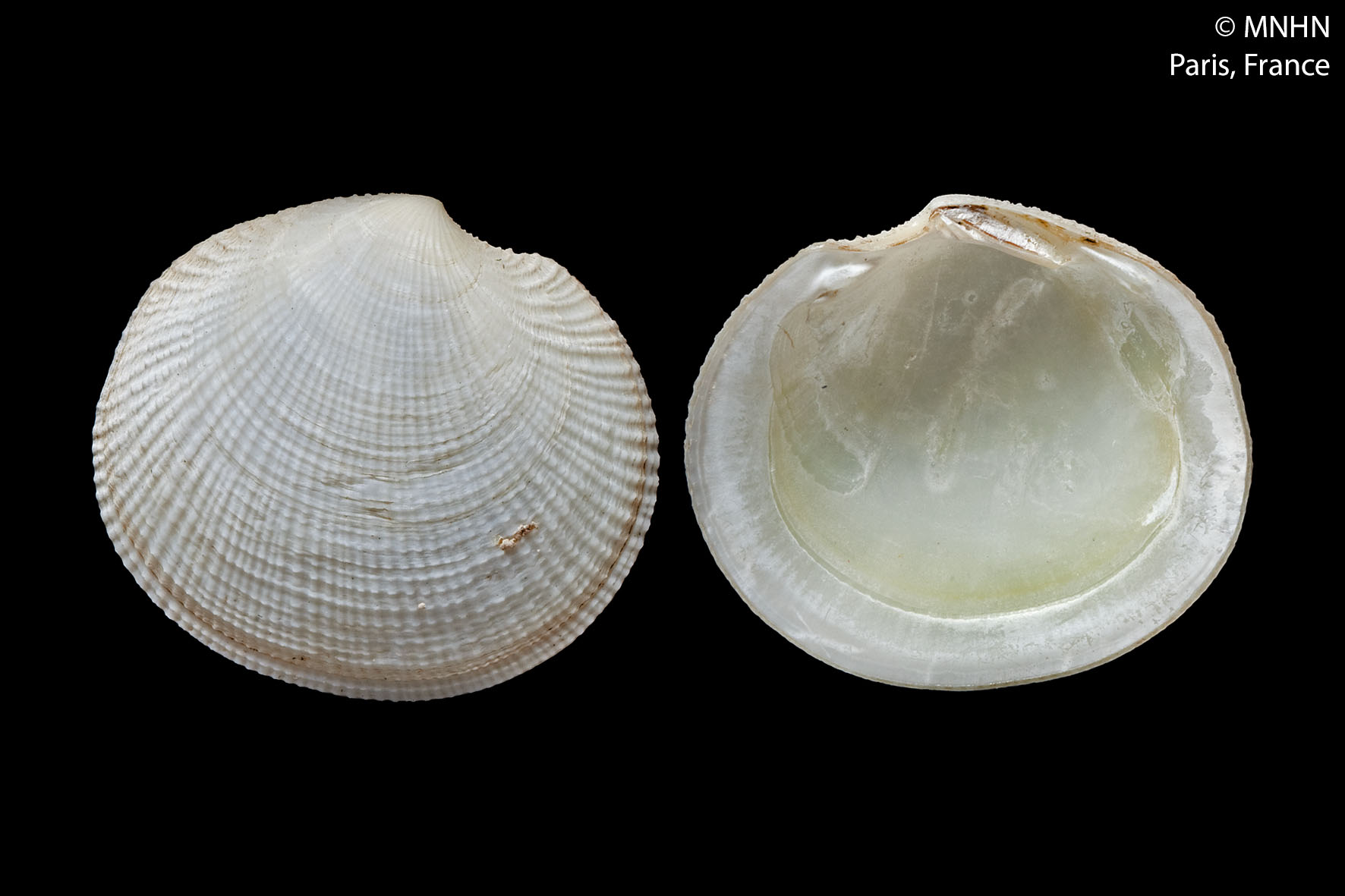
- Ctena bella

Scientific classification
- Domain: Eukaryota
- Kingdom: Animalia
- Phylum: Mollusca
- Class: Bivalvia
- Order: Lucinida
- Family: Lucinidae
- Genus: Ctena; Mörch, 1861

Synonyms
- List: Clathroconcha Coen, 1934; Codakia (Ctena) Mörch, 1861; Codakia (Jagonia) Récluz, 1869; Ctena (Ctena) Mörch, 1861; Jagonella Selli, 1974; Jagonia Récluz, 1869

= Ctena =

Genus of bivalves

Ctena is a genus of bivalves belonging to the family Lucinidae.

The genus has a cosmopolitan distribution.

== Species ==
The following species are recognised in the genus Ctena:

- Ctena bella (Conrad, 1837)
- Ctena decussata (O. G. Costa, 1829)
- Ctena delicatula (Pilsbry, 1904)
- Ctena divergens (Philippi, 1850)
- Ctena eburnea (Gmelin, 1791)
- Ctena galapagana (Dall, 1901)
- Ctena gunnamatta (Iredale, 1930)
- Ctena imbricatula (C. B. Adams, 1845)
- Ctena mexicana (Dall, 1901)
- Ctena orbiculata (Montagu, 1808)
- Ctena reevei (Deshayes, 1863)
- Ctena tatei (Angas, 1879)
