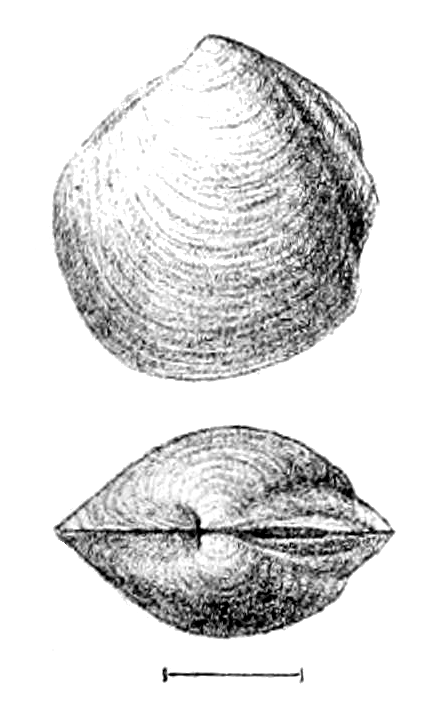

Scientific classification
- Kingdom: Animalia
- Phylum: Mollusca
- Class: Bivalvia
- Order: Lucinida
- Superfamily: Thyasiroidea
- Family: Thyasiridae
- Genus: Thyasira
- Species: T. gouldi

Binomial name
- Thyasira gouldi (Philippi, 1845)

= Thyasira gouldi =

Species of bivalve

Thyasira gouldi, common name the Northern hatchet-shell, is a species of saltwater clam, a marine bivalve mollusc in the family Thyasiridae.

This species has been fully protected since 1992 in the United Kingdom under the Wildlife and Countryside Act 1981.
