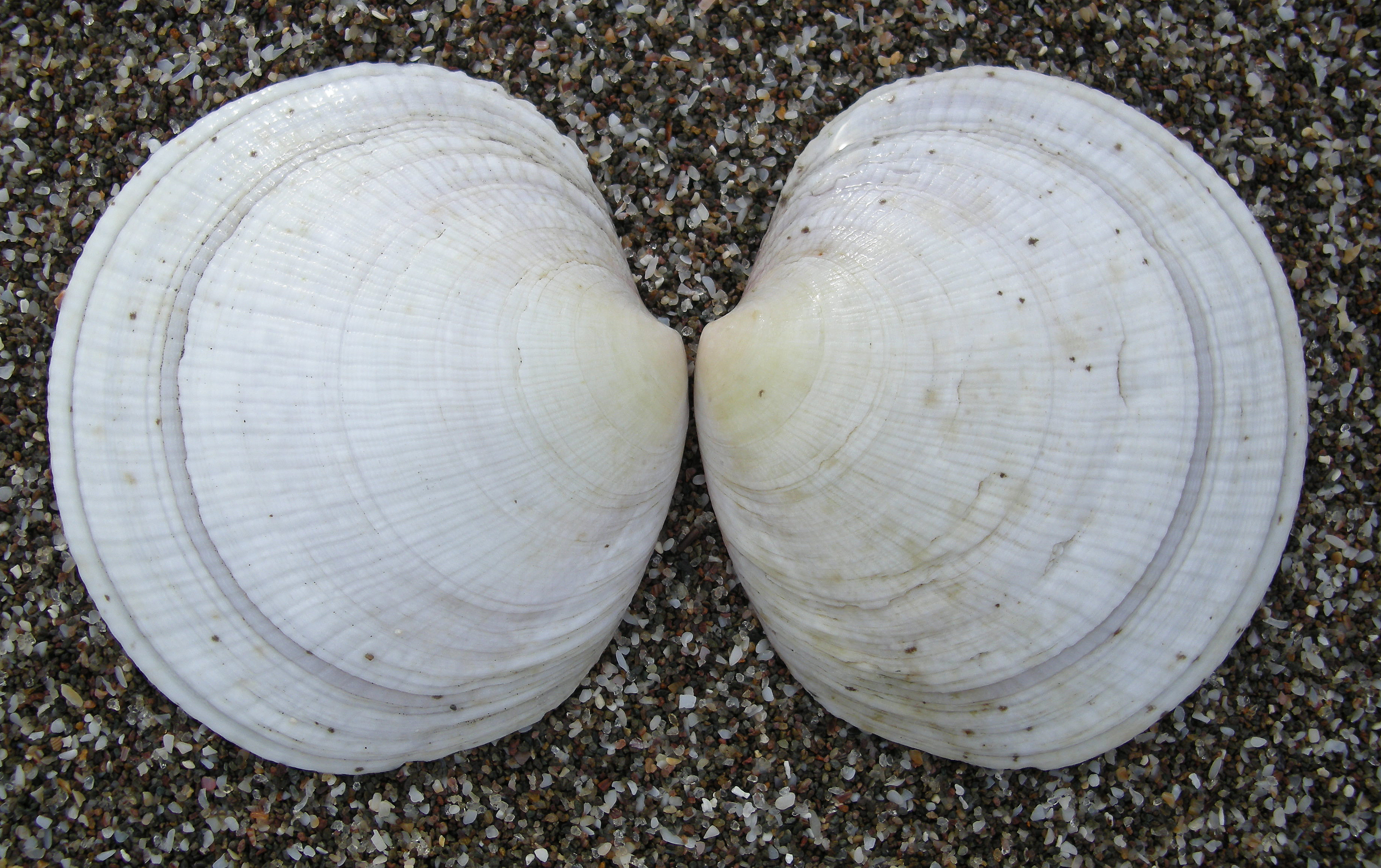
- Exterior of valves
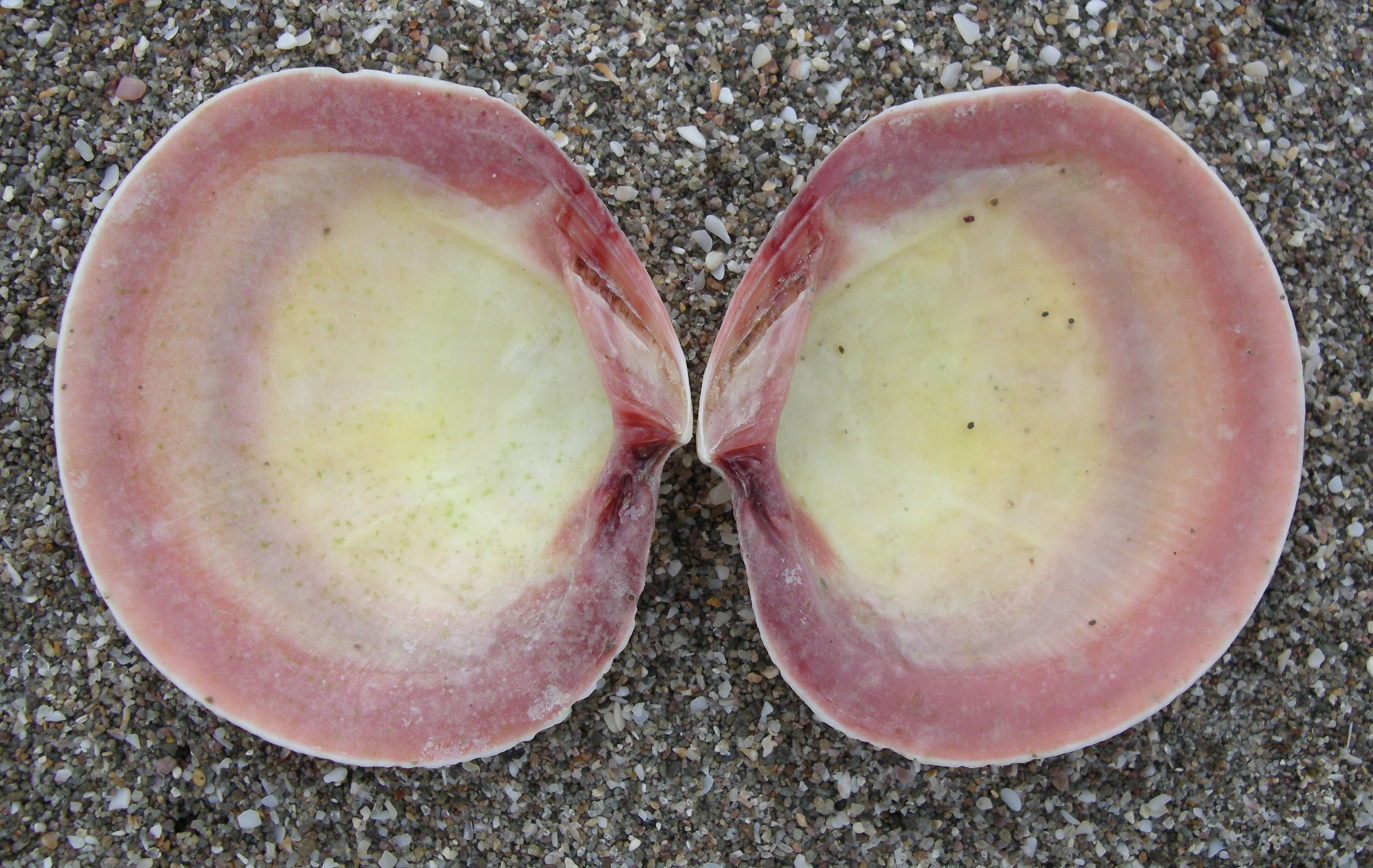
- Interior of valves

Scientific classification
- Kingdom: Animalia
- Phylum: Mollusca
- Class: Bivalvia
- Order: Lucinida
- Family: Lucinidae
- Genus: Codakia
- Species: C. distinguenda

Binomial name
- Codakia distinguenda (Tryon, 1872)

Synonyms
- Lucina distinguenda Tyron, 1872; Codakia colpoica Dall, 1901; Codakia pinchoti Pilsbry & H.N. Lowe, 1932

= Codakia distinguenda =

Codakia distinguenda Temporal range: Pliocene–present, 5.332–0 Ma

Species of bivalve

Codakia distinguenda, the elegant lucine, is a species of marine bivalve mollusc. It was first described to science in 1872 by George Washington Tryon Jr.

== Description ==
The elegant lucine has large, flattened, saucer-like valves. They are the largest member of their family along the west coast of the Americas. The valves are between 50mm and 140mm (2 to 5.5 inches) in width. The exterior of the shell is white with a vivid reticulation, or net-like sculpture of rays and arcs. The interior of the shell shows rose-red margins with a creamy yellow center.

== Distribution ==
The elegant lucine is found in the east Pacific Ocean from Baja California to Peru, including the Gulf of California. It is found in the Galapagos Islands. It is a shallow water species that lives from the intertidal zone to 50 meters (165 feet) deep. Elegant lucinids are infaunal, that is, they live buried in sand or mud on the seabed.

== Life history ==
The elegant lucine is a filter feeder, straining plankton and other nutrients from sea water that it pumps through its body. These animals also obtain energy through chemosymbiosis. They acquire their symbiotic bacteria from sea water. The bacteria are bathed in the sea water pumping through the gills of the animal from which they obtain sulfides and oxygen. The bacteria use these inputs to synthesize nutritious carbon compounds that are transferred to the lucine. In times of starvation, the lucine will consume the bacteria.
