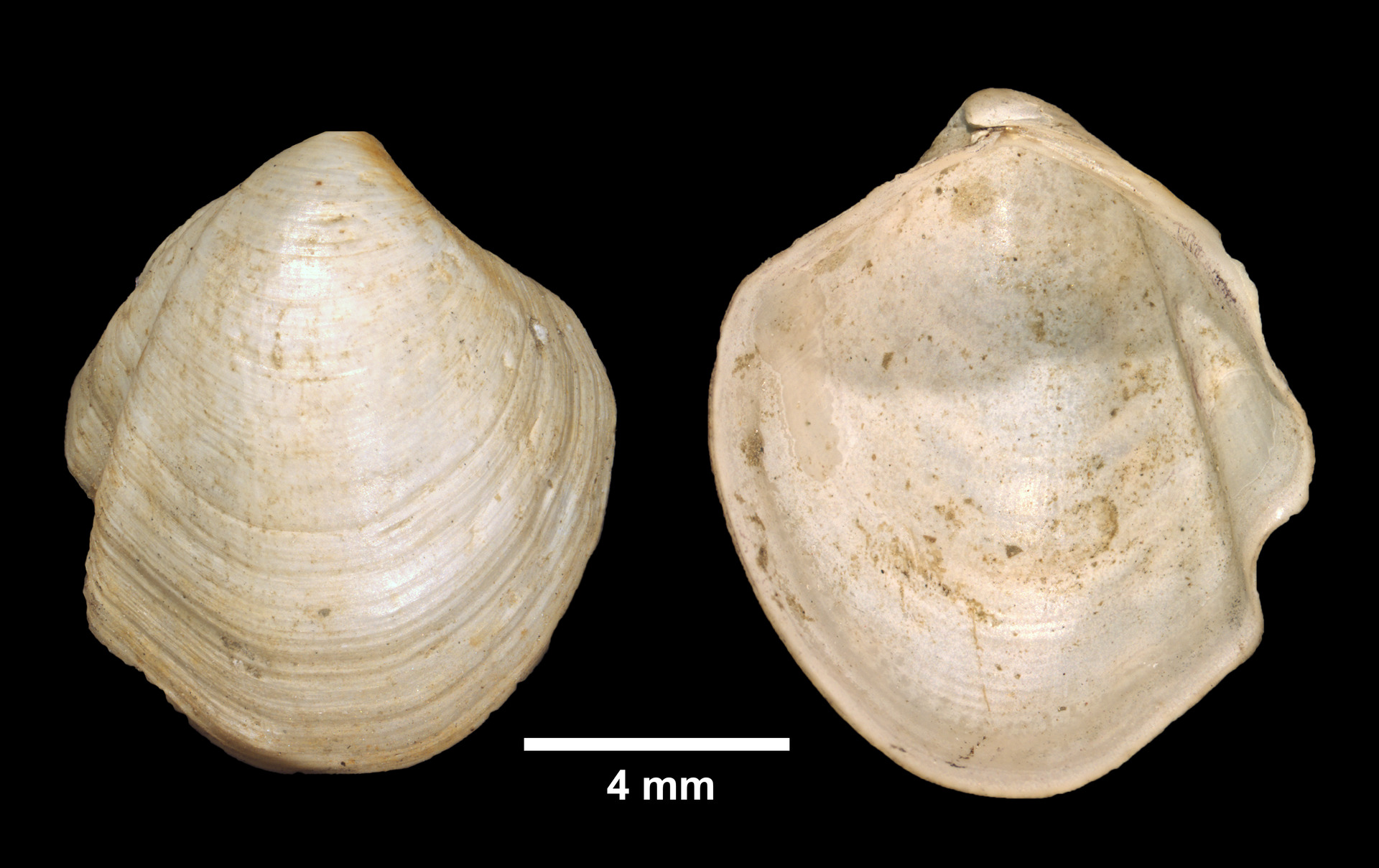

Scientific classification
- Kingdom: Animalia
- Phylum: Mollusca
- Class: Bivalvia
- Order: Lucinida
- Superfamily: Thyasiroidea
- Family: Thyasiridae
- Genus: Thyasira
- Species: T. trisinuata

Binomial name
- Thyasira trisinuata (Orbigny, 1842)

= Thyasira trisinuata =

Species of bivalve

Thyasira trisinuata, common name the "Atlantic cleft clam", is a species of saltwater clam, a marine bivalve mollusc in the family Thyasiridae. This species is found along the Atlantic coast of North America, ranging from Nova Scotia to the West Indies.
