= Ascetoaxinus =

Scientific classification
- Kingdom: Animalia
- Phylum: Mollusca
- Class: Bivalvia
- Order: Lucinida
- Family: Thyasiridae
- Genus: Ascetoaxinus; Oliver and Frey, 2014

Genus of bivalves

Ascetoaxinus is a genus of saltwater clams, marine bivalve molluscs in the family Thyasiridae. The shells of species in this genus have a lunule with a scalloped margin.

The genus was first described in 2014 by Graham Oliver of the National Museum of Wales and Melissa Frey, curator of invertebrates at the Royal British Columbia Museum.

The genus consists of the following species:

- Ascetoaxinus quatsinoensis Oliver and Frey, 2014
- Ascetoaxinus ovoidea (Dall, 1890), formerly known as Cryptodon ovoideus Dall, 1890
