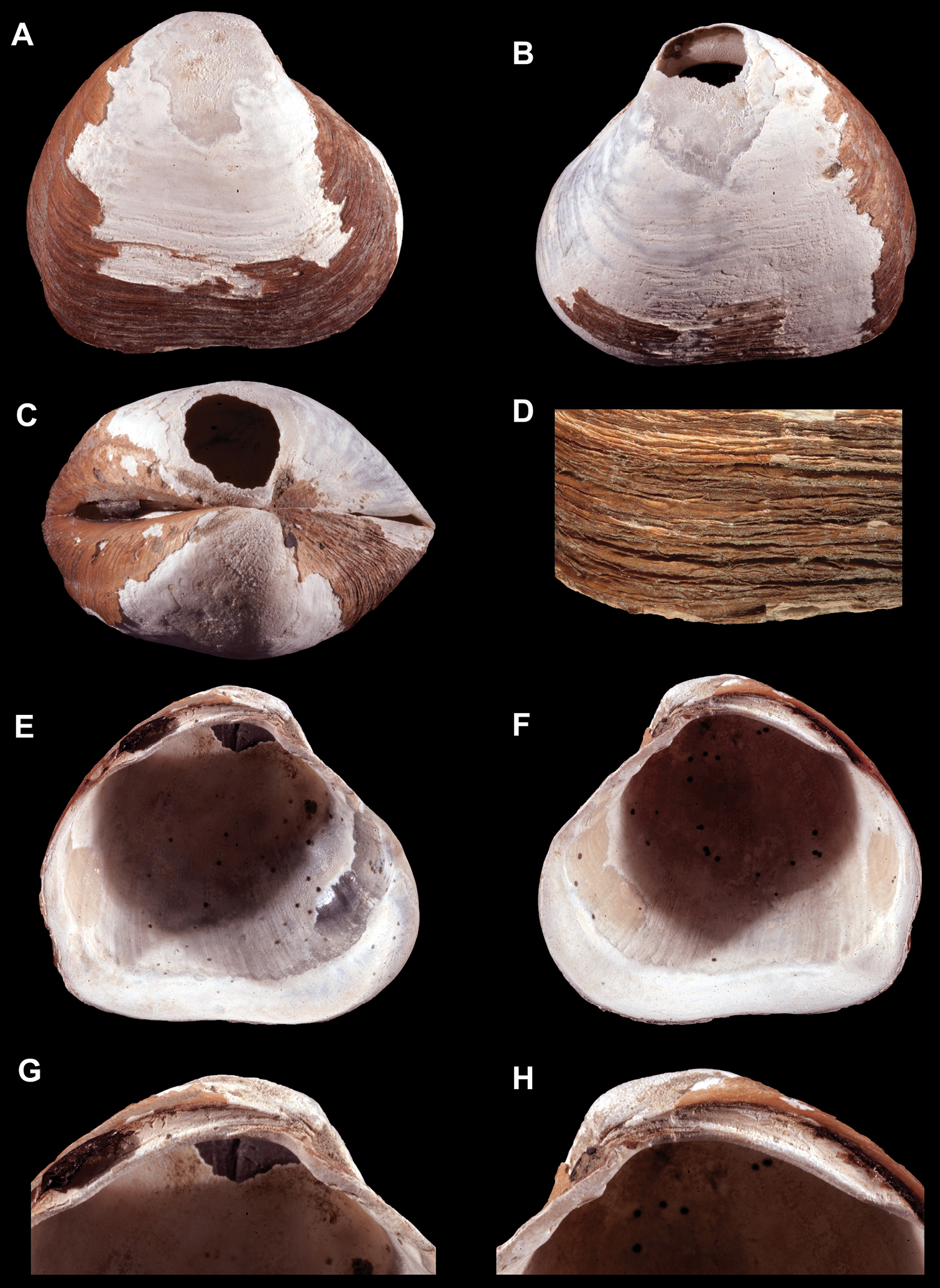
- Wallerconcha sarae holotype

Scientific classification
- Kingdom: Animalia
- Phylum: Mollusca
- Class: Bivalvia
- Order: Lucinida
- Family: Thyasiridae
- Genus: †Wallerconcha
- Species: †W. sarae

Binomial name
- †Wallerconcha sarae (Valentich-Scott and Powell, 2014)

= Wallerconcha sarae =

Extinct species of bivalve

Wallerconcha sarae is an extinct species of saltwater clam, a marine bivalve mollusc in the family Thyasiridae. The species was discovered in 2014 by Paul Valentich-Scott of the Santa Barbara Museum of Natural History and three scientists from the United States Geological Survey, Charles L. Powell, Brian D. Edwards and Thomas D. Lorenson by Arctic Ocean, whilst mapping the sea floor. It was discovered by accident inside a sediment core sample extracted more than 1.5 miles (2.5 km) below the surface of the ocean off the coast of northern Alaska, US, in 2010.

== Etymology ==
It is reported that it was named after Sara Powell, the daughter of Charles L. Powell, one of the co-discoverers, who is credited in saying "I want to name new species after all of my children."

== Gallery ==
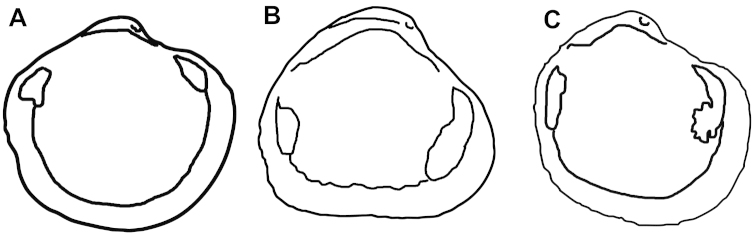
Comparison of adductor muscle scars and pallial lines of left valves of holotypes. A Maorithyas marama, holotype B Wallerconcha sarae, holotype C Spinaxinus sentosus, holotype – Not to scale
