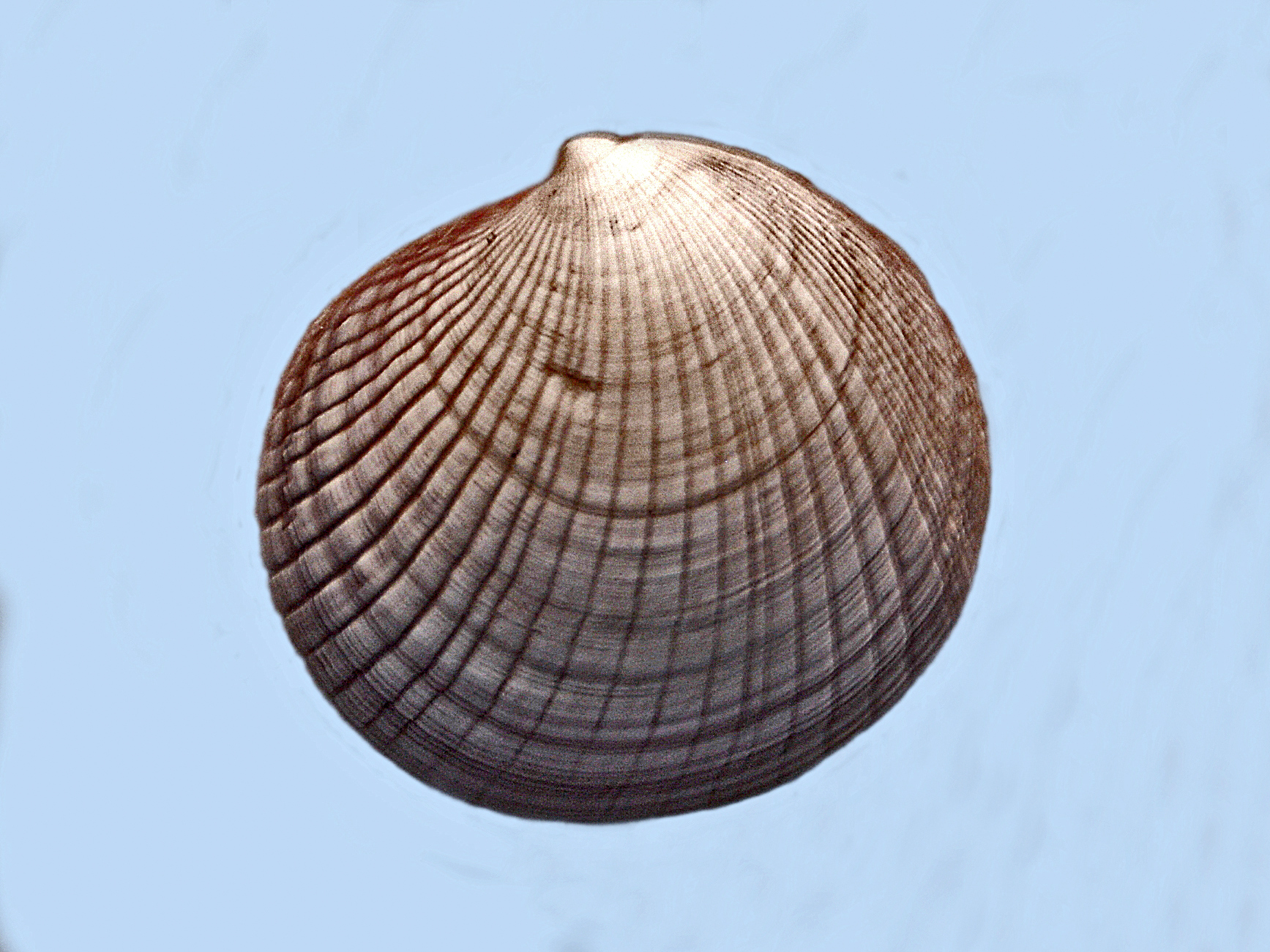
- Valve of Codakia punctata on display at the Museo Civico di Storia Naturale di Milano

Scientific classification
- Kingdom: Animalia
- Phylum: Mollusca
- Class: Bivalvia
- Order: Lucinida
- Family: Lucinidae
- Genus: Codakia
- Species: C. punctata

Binomial name
- Codakia punctata Linnaeus, 1758

= Codakia punctata =

Species of bivalve

Codakia punctata, common name the punctate codakia, is a species of saltwater clam, a marine bivalve mollusc in the family Lucinidae.

This species is found along the coast of Queensland, north Western Australia and Thailand. The shell can reach a size of about 43 millimetres (1.7 in).

Right and left valve of the same specimen:

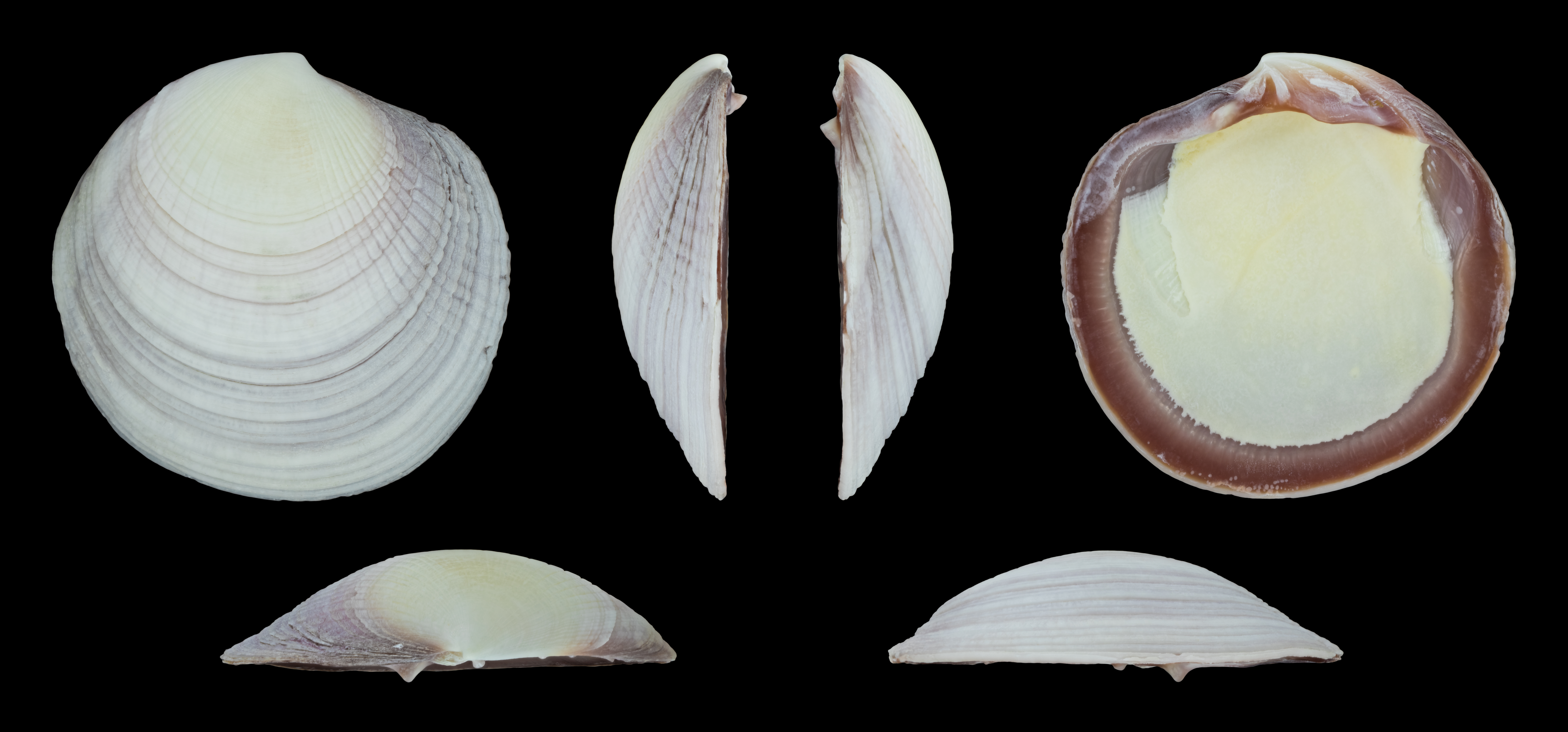
Right valve

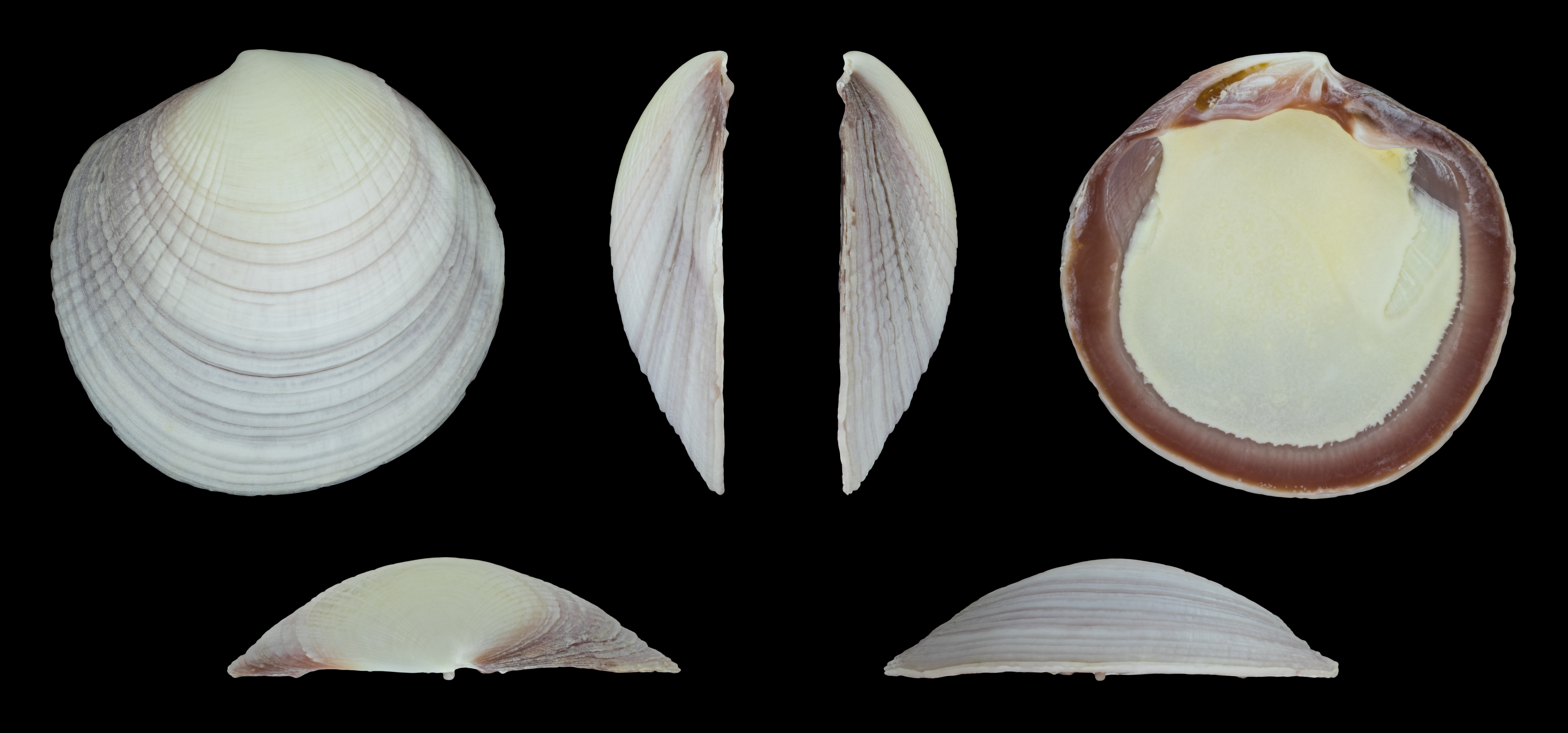
Left valve
