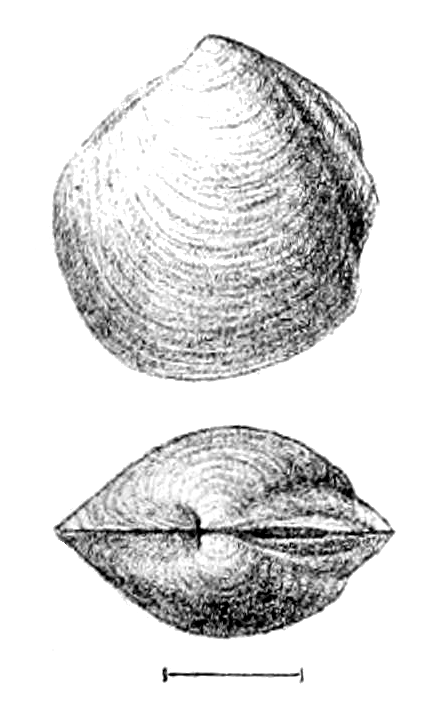
- Thyasira gouldi

Scientific classification
- Kingdom: Animalia
- Phylum: Mollusca
- Class: Bivalvia
- Order: Lucinida
- Superfamily: Thyasiroidea
- Family: Thyasiridae
- Genus: Thyasira; Lamarck, 1818

Species
- See text.

= Thyasira =

Genus of bivalves

Thyasira is a genus of saltwater clams, marine bivalve mollusks in the family Thyasiridae.

== Species ==
There are more than 50 species in the genus, including both extant (living) and extinct fossil species:

- Thyasira acuticarinata (E. A. Smith, 1895)
- Thyasira aequatorialis Jaeckel & Thiele, 1931
- Thyasira anassa P. G. Oliver, 2015
- † Thyasira baca Devjatilova, 1981
- Thyasira barbarensis (Dall, 1890)
- † Thyasira bartrumi A. W. B. Powell, 1935
- † Thyasira benedenii (De Koninck, 1838)
- † Thyasira beui Amano, C. Little, K. A. Campbell, R. G. Jenkins & Saether, 2015
- Thyasira biplicata (R. A. Philippi, 1836)
- Thyasira borshengi Okutani & Lan, 1999
- † Thyasira brongniarti (Deshayes, 1857)
- Thyasira capitanea Åström & P. G. Oliver, 2017
- † Thyasira crassiuscula Yokoyama, 1927
- Thyasira debilis (Thiele, 1912)
- † Thyasira delorioli (Ravn, 1918)
- Thyasira falklandica (E. A. Smith, 1885)
- Thyasira fernandezensis Zelaya, Güller & Bieler, 2024
- Thyasira flexuosa (Montagu, 1803)
- Thyasira fuegiensis (Dall, 1890)
- † Thyasira goodhalli (J. De C. Sowerby, 1837)
- Thyasira gouldii (R. A. Philippi, 1845)
- Thyasira hexangulata Okutani, 1962
- † Thyasira histriaensis Hryniewicz, Kaim & Kiel, 2024
- † Thyasira ignota (Korobkov, 1939)
- Thyasira imamurai Okutani, 1962
- Thyasira inadai Amano & Haga, 2023
- Thyasira kawamurai T. Habe, 1951
- Thyasira kelliaeformis (Okutani, 1962)
- Thyasira kharkhovensis Kamenev, 2023
- Thyasira koyamai (Habe, 1981)
- † Thyasira mactraeformis (Tate, 1887)
- † Thyasira marwicki Amano, C. Little, K. A. Campbell, R. G. Jenkins & Saether, 2015
- Thyasira methanophila P. G. Oliver & Sellanes, 2005
- † Thyasira michelottii (R. Hoernes, 1875)
- † Thyasira minoensis Itoigawa, 1960
- Thyasira minuta Payne & J. A. Allen, 1991
- † Thyasira mironovi Kalishevich, 1981
- Thyasira miyadii T. Habe, 1951
- † Thyasira motutaraensis A. W. B. Powell, 1935
- † Thyasira nakazawai E. Matsumoto, 1971
- † Thyasira nana Khomenko, 1929
- Thyasira obliqua (Okutani, 1968)
- Thyasira obsoleta (A. E. Verrill & K. J. Bush, 1898)
- † Thyasira obtusa (Beyrich, 1848)
- Thyasira oleophila A. H. Clarke, 1989
- † Thyasira oliveri Amano & R. G. Jenkins, 2018
- Thyasira orecta F. R. Bernard, 1982
- † Thyasira ozawai Yokoyama, 1926
- Thyasira patagonica Zelaya, 2010
- † Thyasira peruviana Olsson, 1931
- Thyasira phrygiana Miloslavskaya, 1977
- Thyasira polygona (Jeffreys, 1864)
- Thyasira polygonia (A. A. Gould, 1861)
- Thyasira rotunda (Jeffreys, 1881)
- † Thyasira rouyana (A. d'Orbigny, 1844)
- Thyasira sarsii (R. A. Philippi, 1845)
- Thyasira scotiae P. G. Oliver & Drewery, 2014
- Thyasira scotiana Zelaya, 2009
- † Thyasira sinuata (N. H. Woods, 1931)
- Thyasira southwardae P. G. Oliver & A. M. Holmes, 2006
- Thyasira striata (Sturany, 1896)
- † Thyasira subflexuosa (Tate, 1895)
- Thyasira subovata (Jeffreys, 1881)
- Thyasira succisa (Jeffreys, 1876)
- † Thyasira tanabei Kiel, Amano & R. G. Jenkins, 2008
- Thyasira tokunagai Kuroda & Habe, 1951
- Thyasira tomeana Dall, 1901
- Thyasira tortuosa (Jeffreys, 1881)
- Thyasira trisinuata (A. d'Orbigny, 1853)
- † Thyasira uncinata Kalikevich, 1981
- Thyasira unilateralis Barnard, 1964
- Thyasira valdiviae Jaeckel & Thiele, 1931
- † Thyasira vara Korobkov, 1937
- Thyasira vulcolutre Rodrigues & P. G. Oliver, 2008
- † Thyasira xylodia Kiel & Goedert, 2007
