= Clathrolucina costata =

Scientific classification
- Kingdom: Animalia
- Phylum: Mollusca
- Class: Bivalvia
- Order: Lucinida
- Family: Lucinidae
- Subfamily: Lucininae
- Genus: Clathrolucina
- Species: C. costata

Binomial name
- Clathrolucina costata (Orbigny, 1842)

Synonyms
- Lucina costata d'Orbigny, 1845; Codakia costata (d'Orbigny, 1845); Parvilucina costata (d'Orbigny, 1845); Lucina antillarum Reeve, 1850; Lucina nux Verrill & Bush, 1900; Lucina textilis Philippi, 1850

Species of bivalve

Clathrolucina costata, or the costate lucine, is a species of bivalve mollusc in the family Lucinidae. It can be found along the Atlantic coast of North America, ranging from North Carolina to the West Indies.
