= Lunule (bivalve) =

Crescent-moon shaped area on the shells of some marine bivalves

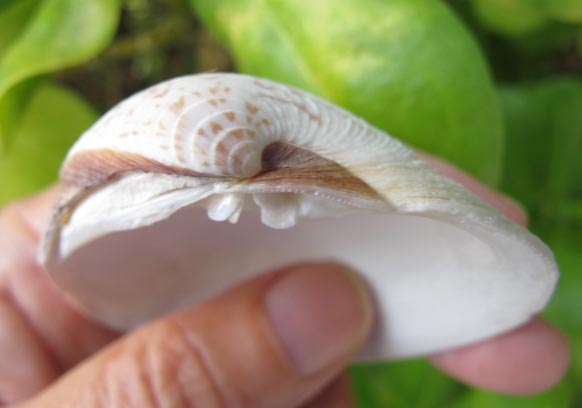
A left valve of a juvenile Mercenaria campechiensis viewed from the top to show the brown-tinted lunule on the right, next to the forward facing beak.

A lunule (from the Latin meaning small moon or crescent moon) is an anatomical feature which is found in the exterior surface of the shells of some species of clams, bivalve mollusks, as for example in the family Veneridae and in the genus Ascetoaxinus.

The lunule is a well-defined area near the hinge line of the shell, anterior to the beaks. Despite the name, a lunule is not always in the shape of a crescent moon. Details of the lunule are sometimes an important diagnostic feature in identifying a bivalve shell.

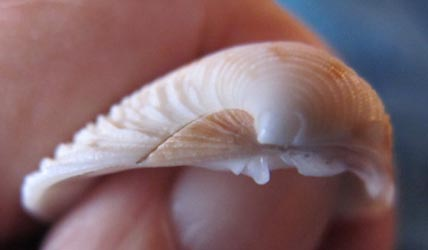
A right valve of Chionopsis intapurpurea viewed from the top to show the brown-tinted lunule.
