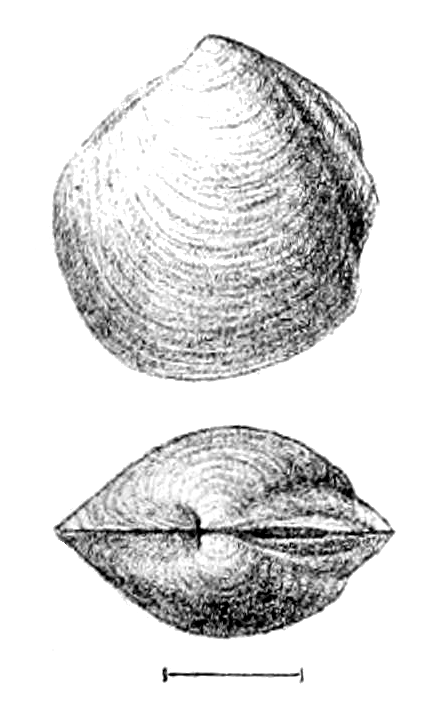
- Thyasira gouldi

Scientific classification
- Kingdom: Animalia
- Phylum: Mollusca
- Class: Bivalvia
- Order: Lucinida
- Superfamily: Thyasiroidea
- Family: Thyasiridae; Dall, 1900 (1895)

Genera
- See text

= Thyasiridae =

Family of bivalves

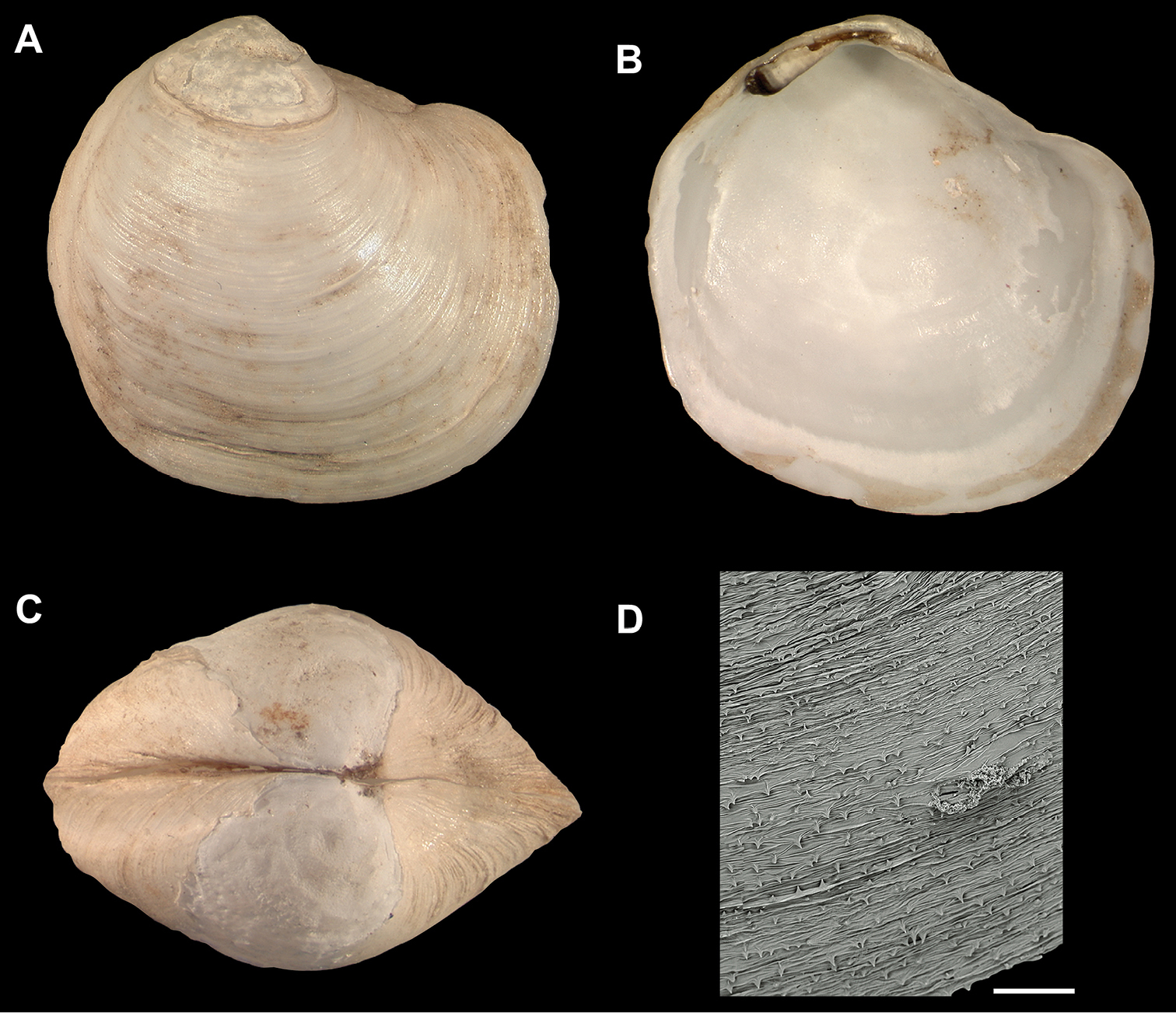
Spinaxinus sentosus

Thyasiridae is a family of bivalve molluscs, including the cleft clams, in the order Lucinida.

== Genera and species ==
- Adontorhina S. S. Berry, 1947
  - Adontorhina cyclia S. S. Berry, 1947
  - Adontorhina keegani Barry & McCormack, 2007
  - Adontorhina lynnae Valentich-Scott, 2000
  - Adontorhina pisum (Dall, 1908)
  - Adontorhina similis Barry & McCormack, 2007
  - Adontorhina sphaericosa Scott, 1986
  - Adontorhina transversa (Payne & Allen, 1991)
  - Adontorhina zelayai Valentich-Scott, 2012
- Ascetoaxinus P. G. Oliver & Frey, 2014
- Axinodon A. E. Verrill and Bush, 1898
  - Axinodon redondoensis (T. A. Burch, 1941)
  - Axinodon symmetros (Jeffreys, 1876)
- Axinopsida Keen and Chavan, 1951
  - Axinopsida cordata (A. E. Verrill and Bush, 1898)
  - Axinopsida orbiculata (G. O. Sars, 1878)
  - Axinopsida serricata (Carpenter, 1864)
  - Axinopsida viridis (Dall, 1901)
- Axinulus A. E. Verrill and Bush, 1898
  - Axinulus careyi Bernard, 1979
  - Axinulus eumyaria (M. Sars, 1870)
  - Axinulus redondoensis (T. A. Burch, 1941)
- Axinus J. Sowerby, 1821
- Channelaxinus Valentich-Scott & Coan, 2012
- Conchocele Gabb, 1866
  - Conchocele bisecta (Conrad, 1849) – giant cleft clam
  - Conchocele disjuncta Gabb, 1866
- Genaxinus Iredale, 1930
  - Genaxinus cookianus Fleming, 1950
  - Genaxinus otagoensis (Suter, 1913)
- Leptaxinus A. E. Verrill and Bush, 1898
  - Leptaxinus incrassatus (Jeffreys, 1876)
  - Leptaxinus minutus A. E. Verrill and Bush, 1898
- Maorithyas Fleming, 1950
  - Maorithyas flemingi Powell, 1955
  - Maorithyas marama Fleming, 1950
- Mendicula Iredale, 1924
  - Mendicula ferruginosa (Forbes, 1844)
- Ochetoctena P. G. Oliver, 2014
- Odontogena Cowan, 1964
- Parathyasira Iredale, 1930
- Philis Fischer, 1861
- Prothyasira Iredale, 1930
- Rhacothyas Åström & P. G. Oliver, 2017
- Spinaxinus Oliver & Holmes, 2006
  - Spinaxinus emicatus Oliver, 2013
  - Spinaxinus phrixicus Oliver, 2013
  - Spinaxinus sentosus Oliver and Holmes, 2006
- Thyasira Lamarck, 1818
  - Thyasira alleni Carrozza, 1981
  - Thyasira barbarensis (Dall, 1890)
  - Thyasira brevis A. E. Verrill and Bush, 1898
  - Thyasira croulinensis Jeffreys, 1874
  - Thyasira cycladia S. Wood, 1853
  - Thyasira cygnus Dall, 1916 – Swan cleft clam
  - Thyasira elliptica Verrill and Bush, 1898
  - Thyasira equalis (A. E. Verrill and Bush, 1898)
  - Thyasira eumyaria M. Sars, 1870
  - Thyasira flexuosa (Montagu, 1803)
  - Thyasira gouldi (Philippi, 1845)
  - Thyasira grandis Verrill and Smith, 1885
  - Thyasira granulosa Monterosato, 1874
  - Thyasira incrassatus (Jeffreys, 1876)
  - Thyasira obsoleta (Verrill and Bush, 1898)
  - Thyasira ovoidea Dall, 1889
  - Thyasira peroniana peregrina Iredale, 1930
  - Thyasira peroniana waikanae Fleming, 1950
  - Thyasira plicata Verrill and Smith, 1885
  - Thyasira pygmaea Verrill and Bush, 1898
  - Thyasira resupina neozelanica (Iredale, 1930)
  - Thyasira rotunda Jeffreys, 1881
  - Thyasira simplex A. E. Verrill and Bush, 1898
  - Thyasira subovata Jeffreys, 1881
  - Thyasira subtrigona (Jeffreys, 1858)
  - Thyasira succisa (Jeffreys, 1876)
  - Thyasira tortuosa Jeffreys, 1881
  - Thyasira tricarinata Dall, 1916
  - Thyasira triseriata
  - Thyasira trisinuata (d'Orbigny, 1842) – Atlantic cleft clam
- Tauraxinus Sacco, 1901
- Wallerconcha
  - Wallerconcha sarae
