= List of marine molluscs of Venezuela =

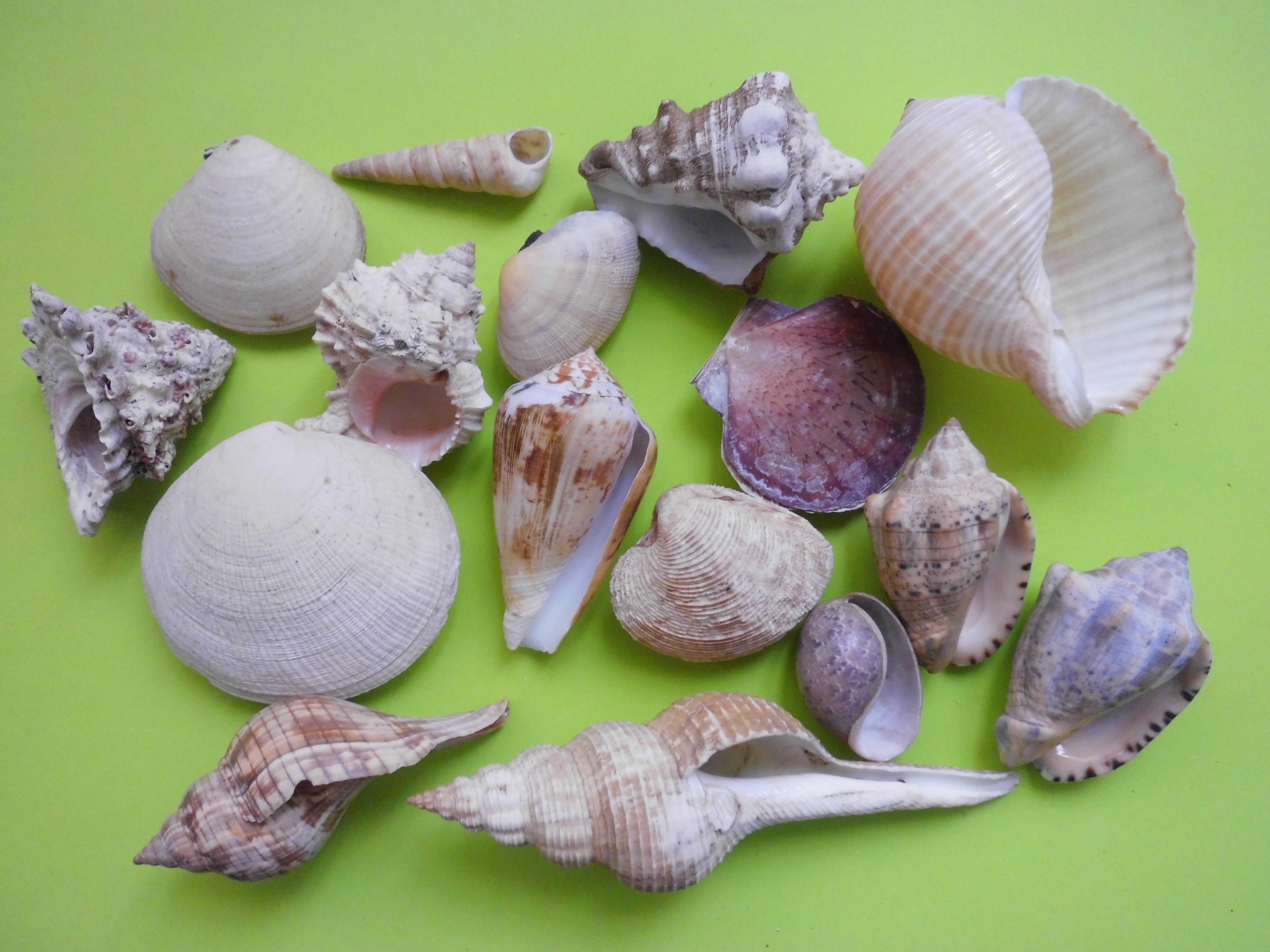
Shell of marine molluscs from Venezuela

Location of Venezuela

The marine molluscs of Venezuela are a part of the molluscan fauna of Venezuela. The marine molluscs are the snails, clams and mussels, chitons, octopuses, squid and cuttlefish that live in marine and estuarine habitats. The freshwater and land molluscs are not included in this list.

This is a partial list of the marine molluscs of Venezuela. The families are listed alphabetically within the classes.

== Statistics ==
Class	Nº of Families	Nº of Genera	Nº of Species
Gastropoda	76	204	528
Bivalvia	50	140	336
Cephalopoda	5	7	13
Polyplachophora	5	9	19
Scaphopoda	3	6	8
Total	139	366	904

== Class Polyplacophora ==
=== Suborder Acanthochitonina ===
==== Acanthochitonidae ====
- Americhiton andersoni (Watters, 1981)
- Americhiton balesae (Abbott, 1954)
- Acanthochitona pygmaea (Pilsbry, 1893)
- Acanthochitona retrojecta (Pilsbry, 1893)
- Acanthochitona venezuelana Lyons, 1988

=== Suborder Chitonina ===
==== Chaetopleuridae ====
- Chaetopleura apiculata (Say, 1834)
- Lepidochitona liozonis (Dall & Simpson, 1901)

==== Chitonidae ====
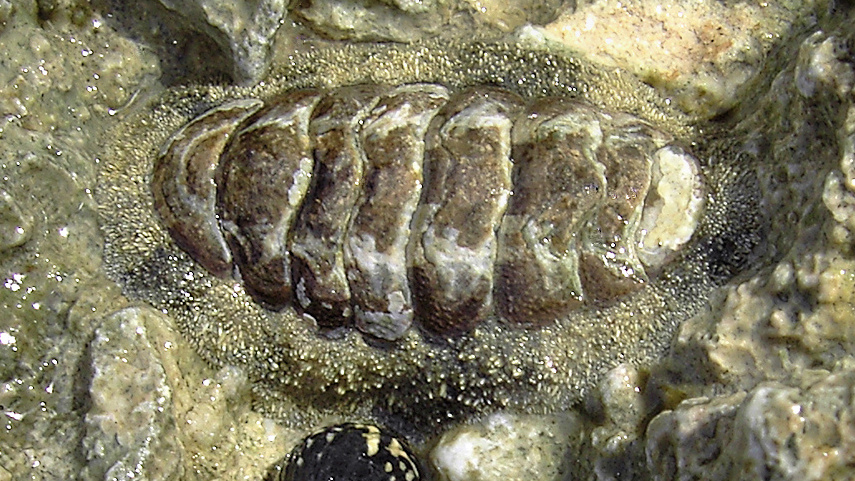
Acanthopleura granulata

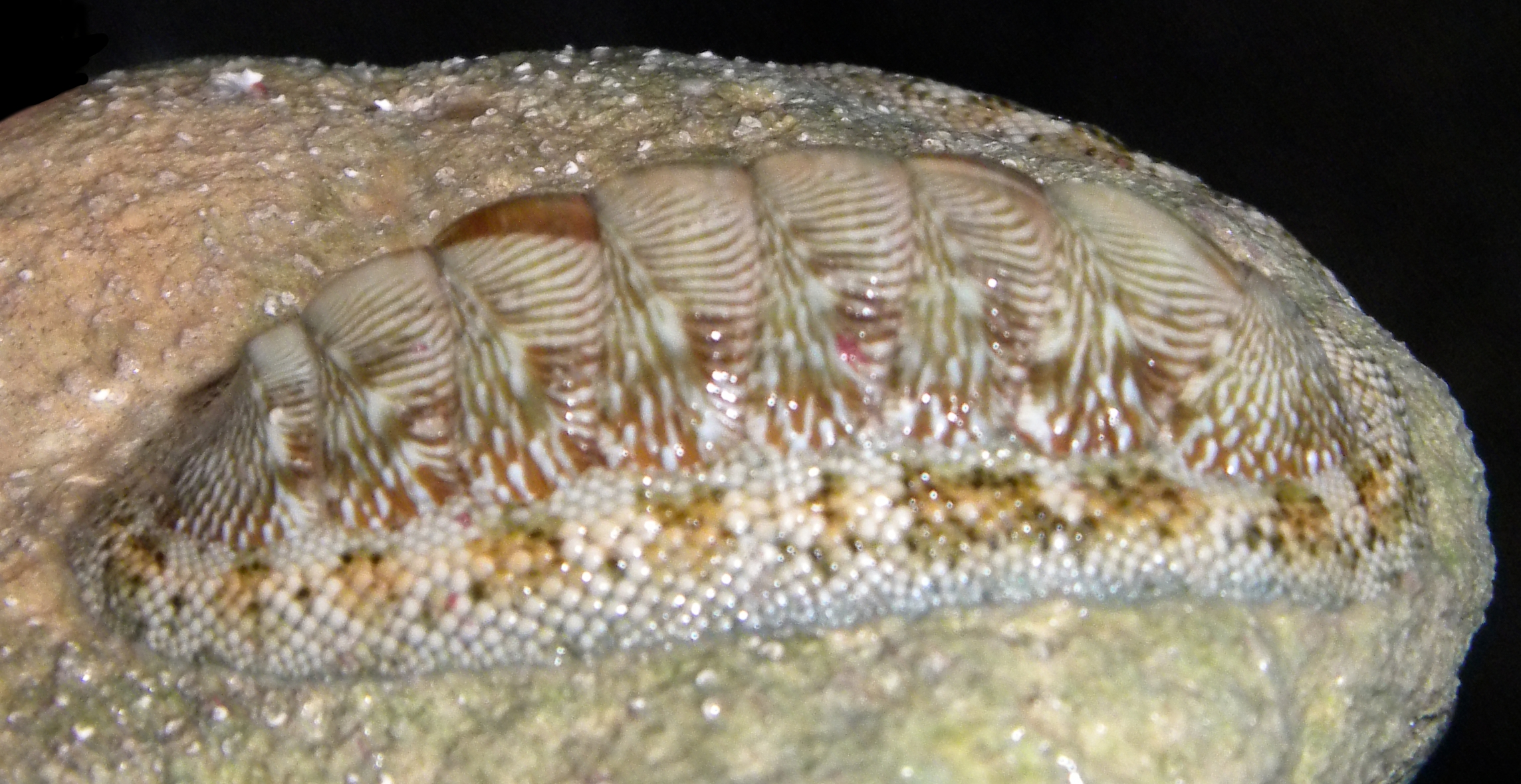
Chiton tuberculatus

- Acanthopleura granulata (Gmelin, 1791)
- Chiton marmoratus Gmelin, 1791
- Chiton squamosus Linnaeus, 1764
- Chiton tuberculatus Linnaeus, 1758
- Rhyssoplax janeirensis (Gray, 1828)

==== Ischnochitonidae ====
- Callistochiton portobelensis Ferreira 1976
- Ceratozona squalida (Adams, 1845)
- Ischnochiton hartmeyeri Thiele, 1916
- Ischnochiton papillosus (Adams, 1845)
- Ischnochiton striolatus (Gray, 1829)
- Stenoplax boogii (Haddon, 1886)
- Stenoplax purpurascens (Haddon, 1886)

== Class Scaphopoda ==
=== Order Dentaliida ===
==== Dentaliidae ====
- Dentalium laqueatum A. E. Verrill, 1885
- Graptacme semistriolata (Guilding, 1834)
- Fissidentalium
- Paradentalium americanum Philippi, 1843

==== Laevidentaliidae ====
- Laevidentalium

=== Order Gadilida ===
==== Gadilidae ====
- Gadila dominguensis (d'Orbigny, 1853)
- Polyschides tetraschistus (Watson, 1879)

== Class Gastropoda ==
=== Superfamily Acteonoidea ===
==== Aplysiidae ====
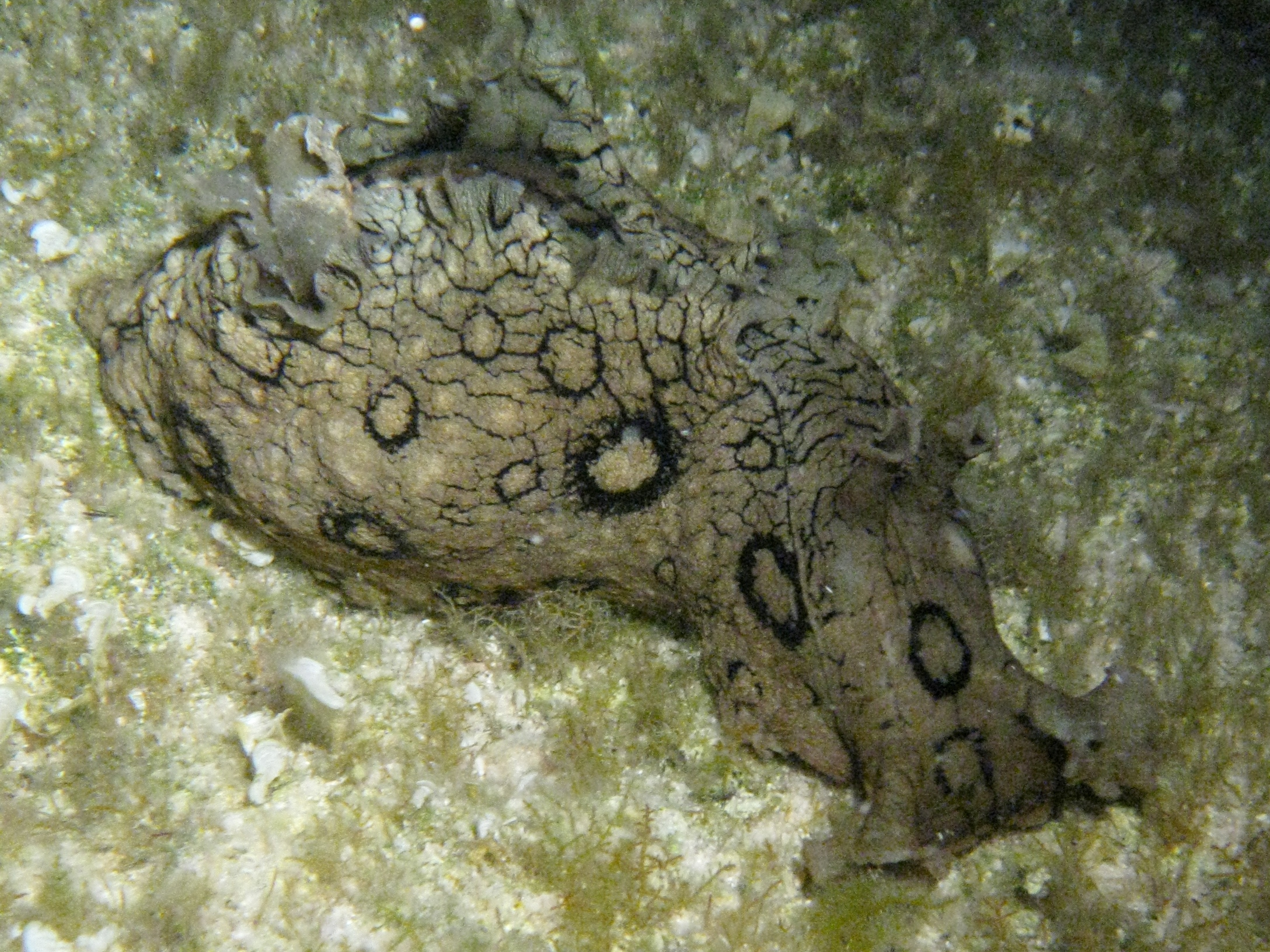
Aplysia dactylomela

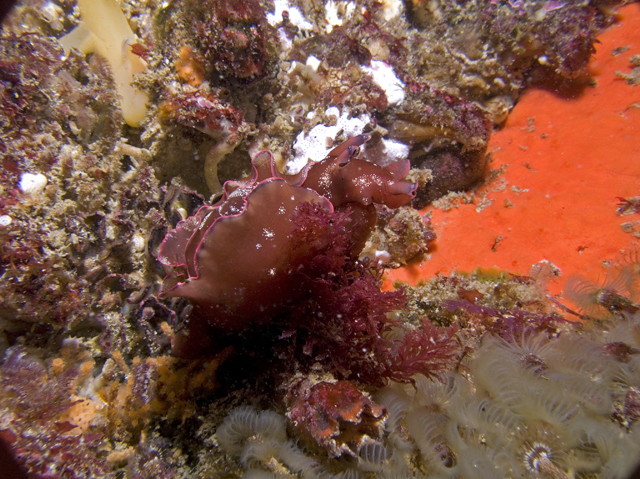
Aplysia parvula

- Aplysia brasiliana Rang, 1828
- Aplysia cervina (Dall & Simpson, 1901)
- Aplysia dactylomela Rang, 1828
- Aplysia juliana Quoy & Gaimard, 1832
- Aplysia parvula Mörch, 1863 3
- Bursatelle pleii Rang, 1828

=== Superfamily Architectonicoidea ===
==== Architectonicidae ====
- Architectonica nobilis Röding, 1798
- Heliacus bisulcatus Orbigny, 1842
- Heliacus cylindricus (Gmelin, 1791)

=== Superfamily Buccinoidea ===
==== Buccinidae ====
- Engina turbinella (Kiener, 1835)
- Engoniophos unicinctus (Say, 1845)
- Pallacera guadalupensis (Petit, 1852)
- Pisania lineata (Conrad, 1846)
- Pisania pusio (Linnaeus, 1758)

==== Columbellidae ====
- Suturoglypta pretrii (Reeve, 1849)
- Parvanachis obesa (Adams, 1845)
- Costoanachis catenata (Sowerby I, 1844)
- Costoanachis hotessieriana (Orbigny, 1842)
- Anachis plicatulum (Dunker, 1857)
- Anachis pulchella (Blainville, 1829)
- Costoanachis semiplicata Stearns, 1873
- Costoanachis sertulariarum (d'Orbigny, 1842)
- Costoanachis sparsa (Reeve, 1859)
- Columbella mercatoria Linnaeus, 1758
- Mazatlania cosentini (Philippi, 1836)
- Mitrella albella (Adams, 1850)
- Mitrella fenestrata (Adams, 1850)
- Astyris lunata (Say, 1826)
- Mitrella ocellata (Gmelin, 1791)
- Nitidella dichroa Sowerby 1858
- Nitidella nitida (Lamarck, 1822))
- Rhombinella laevigata (Linnaeus, 1758)
- Strombina pumilio (Reeve, 1859))

==== Fasciolariidae ====
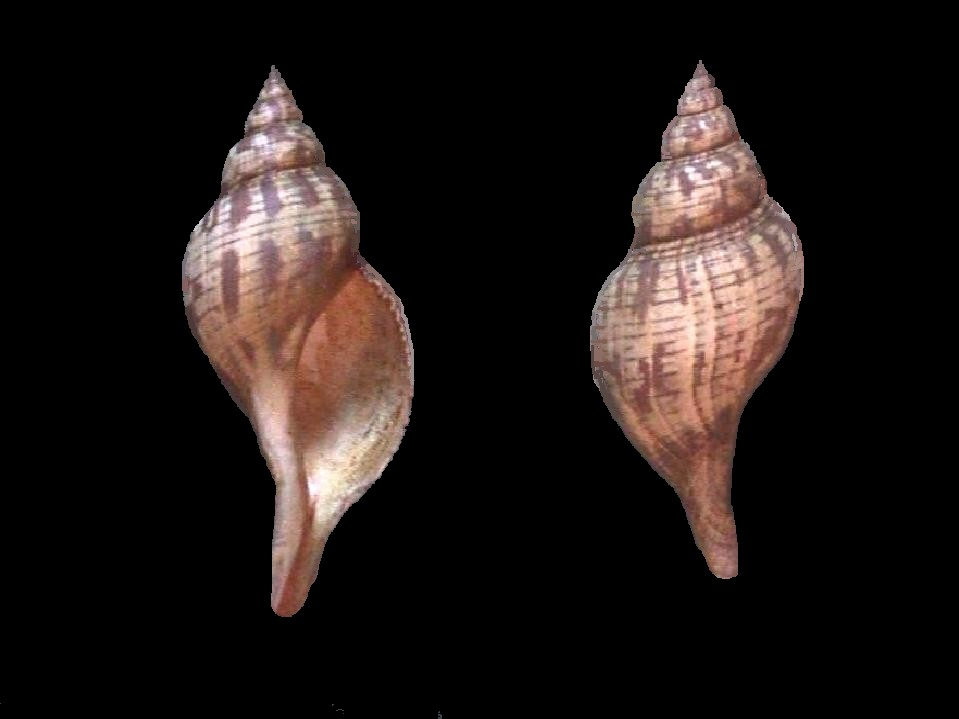
Fasciolaria tulipa

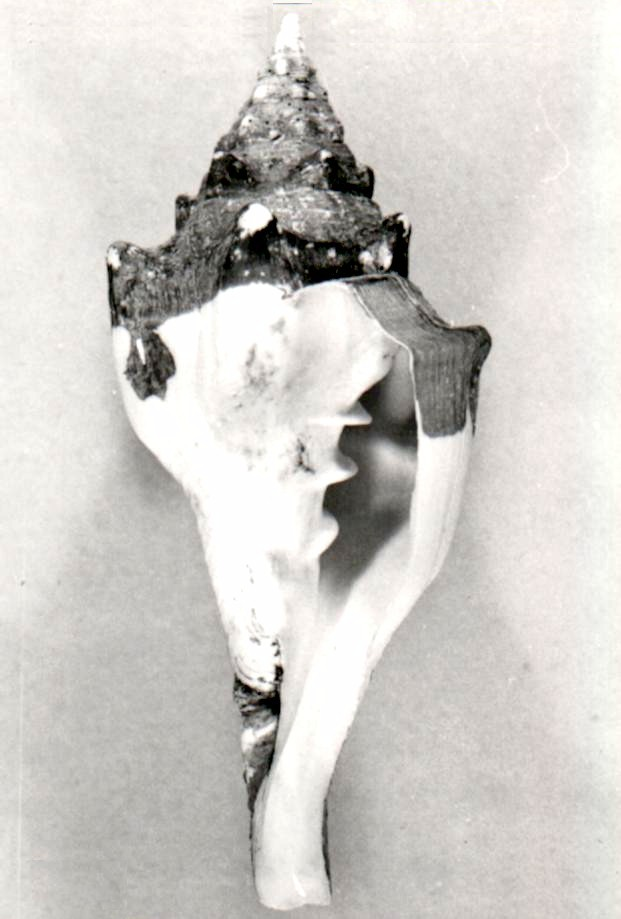
Triplofusus papillosus

- Aristofusus excavatus (Sowerby II, 1880)
- Fasciolaria tulipa (Linnaeus, 1758)

- Fasciolaria tulipa hollisteri (Weisbord, 1962)

- Barbarofusus barbarensis (Trask, 1855) (Introduced species)
- Fusinus bitteri Gibson-Smith
- Lyonsifusus carvalhoriosi Macsotay & Campos, 2001
- Aristofusus couei (Petit de la Saussaye, 1853)
- Aristofusus helenae Bartsch, 1939
- Fusinus howelli Clench & Aguayo, 1940
- Fusinus dilectus Weisbord, 1962
- Lyonsifusus martinezi Macsotay & Campos, 2001
- Fusinus veatchi (Maury, 1917)
- Heilprinia timessa (Dall, 1889)
- Hemipolygona mcgintyi (Pilsbry, 1939)
- Polygona angulata (Röding, 1798)
- Polygona infundibulum (Gmelin, 1791)
- Leucozonia nassa (Gmelin, 1791)
- Leucozonia ocellata (Gmelin, 1791)
- Lyonsifusus ansatus (Gmelin, 1791)
- Marmorofusus verrucosus (Gmelin, 1791) (Introduced species)
- Triplofusus papillosus (Sowerby I, 1825)

==== Melongenidae ====
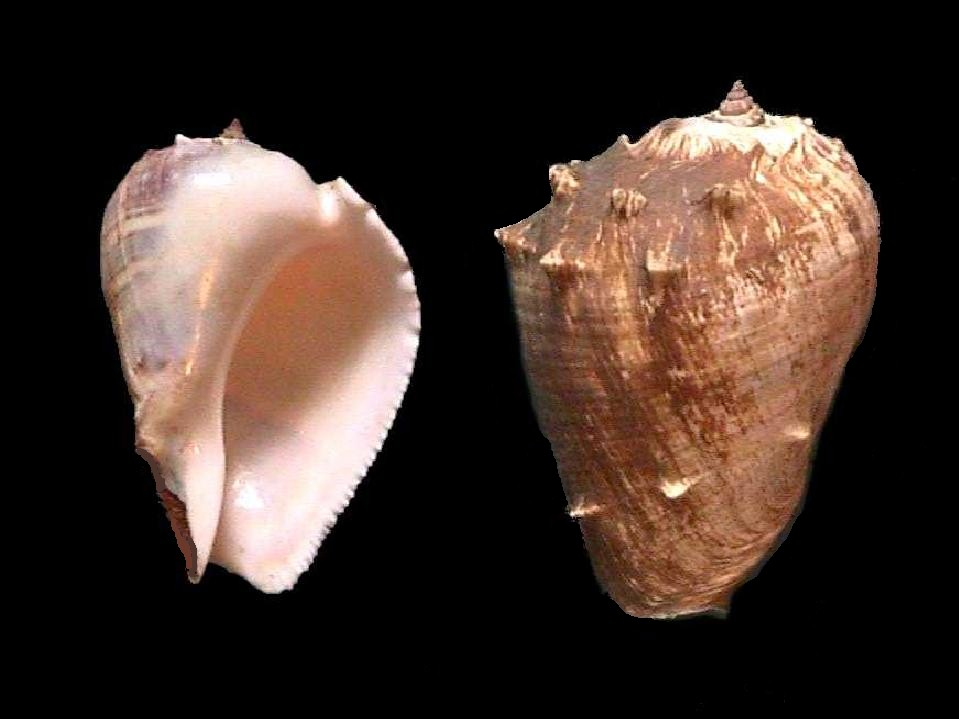
Melongena melongena

- Melongena melongena (Linnaeus, 1758)
- Melongena corona (Gmelin, 1791)
- Pugilina morio (Linnaeus, 1758)

==== Pisaniidae ====
- Gemophos auritulus (Link, 1807)
- Gemophos tinctus (Conrad, 1846)

=== Superfamily Bulloidea ===
==== Bullidae ====
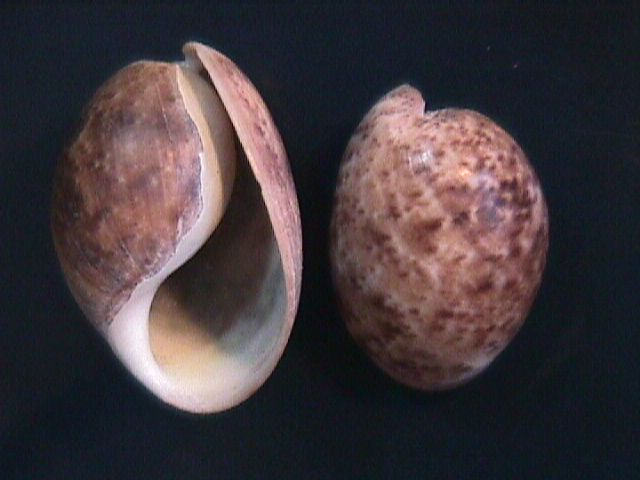
Bulla striata

- Bulla striata Bruguière, 1792
  - Bulla striata occidentalis Adams, 1850
- Bulla solida (Gmelin, 1791)

==== Retusidae ====
- Purunculus caelatus Bush 1885
- Retusa bullata Kiener, 1834
- Retusa candei (Orbigny, 1842)
- Retusa sulcata (Orbigny, 1842)
- Ryzorus ozyllatus Bush, 1885
- Volvulella persimilis Mörch, 1875

=== Superfamily Calyptraeoidea ===
==== Calyptraeidae ====
- Calyptraea centralis (Conrad, 1841)
- Cheilea equestris (Linnaeus, 1758)
- Crepidula aculeata (Gmelin, 1791)
- Crepidula convexa Say, 1822
- Crepidula incurva (Broderip, 1834)
- Crepidula plana Say, 1822
- Crepidula rostrata Adams, 1852
- Crucibulum auricula (Gmelin, 1791)
- Crucibulum marense Weisbordn 1962
- Crucibulum striatum (Say, 1828)

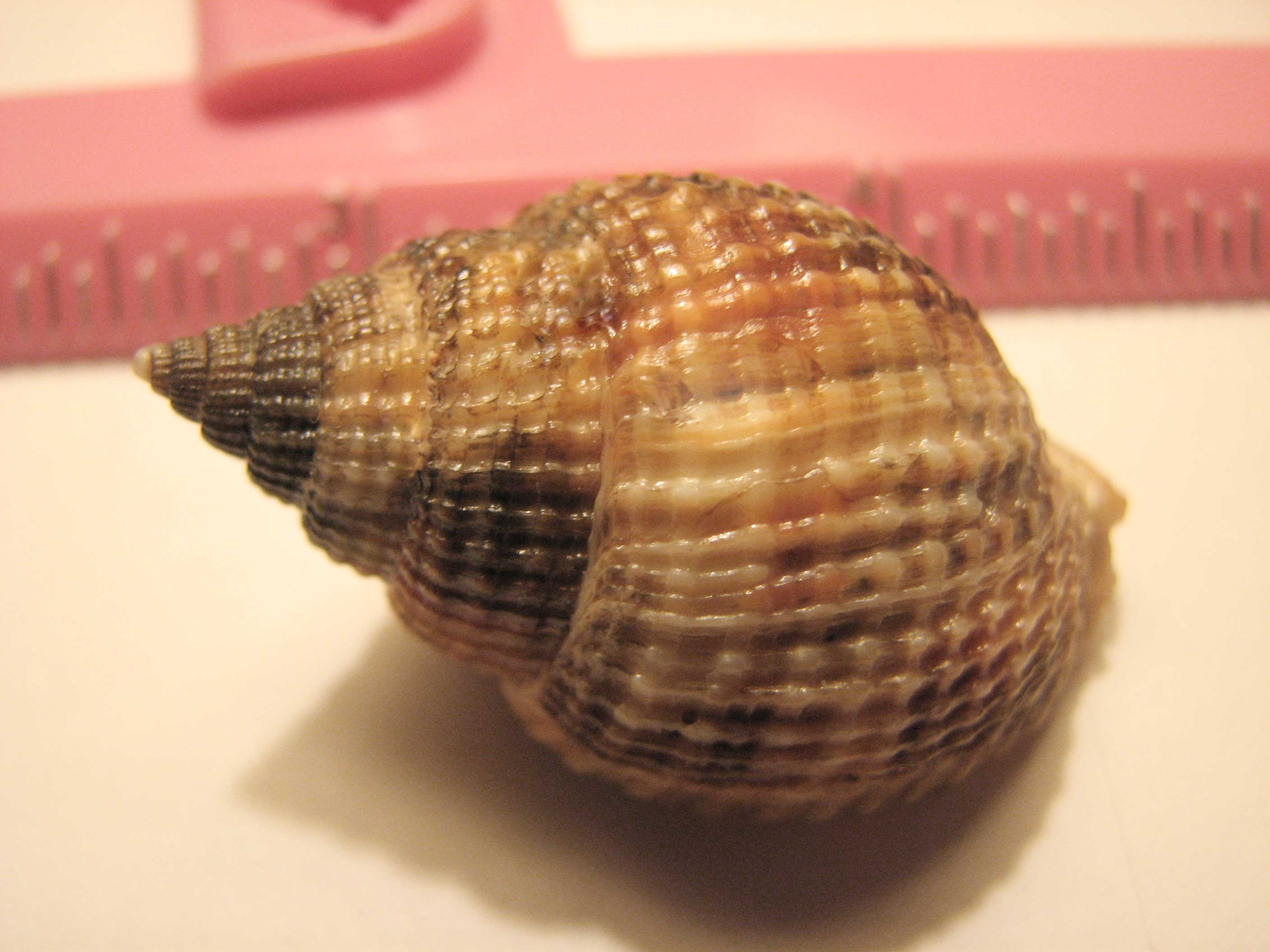
Cancellaria reticulata

=== Superfamily Cavolinioidea ===
==== Cavoliniidae ====
- Cavolinia longirostris (Blainville, 1821)
- Cavolinia trispinosa (Blainville, 1821)
- Diacria trispinosa (Blainville, 1821)

==== Creseidae ====
- Creseis acicula Rang, 1828

=== Superfamily Cerithioidea ===
==== Cerithiidae ====
- Cerithium algicola Adams, 1848
- Cerithium atratum (Born, 1778)
- Cerithium eburneum Bruguière, 1792
- Cerithium guinaicum Philippi, 1849
- Cerithium litterattum (Born, 1778)
- Cerithium lutosum Menke, 1828
- Diastoma varium (Pfeiffer, 1840)

==== Modulidae ====
- Trochomodulus carchedonius (Lamarck, 1822)
- Modulus cerodes (Adams, 1851) (Introduced species)
- Modulus modulus (Linnaeus, 1758)

==== Planaxidae ====
- Planaxis lineatus (Da Costa, 1778)
- Planaxis nucleus (Bruguière, 1789)

==== Potamididae ====
- Cerithidea costata (Da Costa, 1778)
- Cerithidea scalariformis (Say, 1825)
- Batillaria minima (Gmelin, 1791)

==== Scaliolidae ====
- Finella dubia (d'Orbigny, 1840)

==== Turritellidae ====
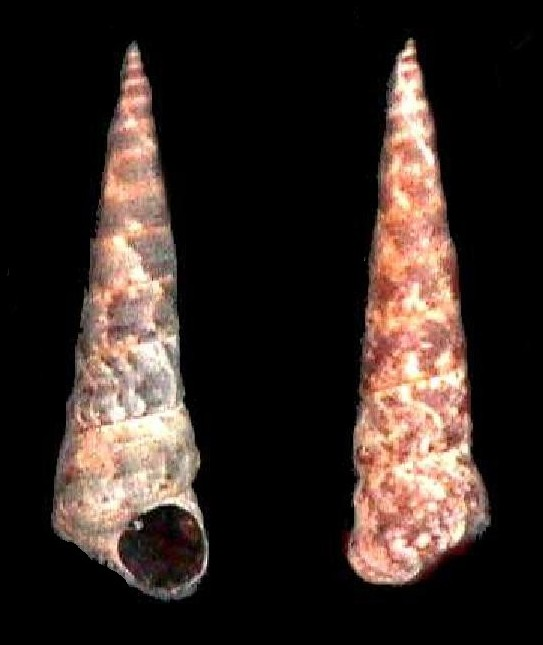
Turritella variegata

- Turritella acropa Dall, 1889
- Turritella exoleta (Linnaeus, 1758)
- Turritella maiquetiana (Weisbord, 1962)
- Turritella paraguanensis F. Hodson, 1926
- Turritella variegata (Linnaeus, 1758)

=== Superfamily Conoidea ===
==== Conidae ====
- Conus aurantius Bruguière, 1872
- Conus austini Rehder y Abbott, 1951
- Conus brasiliensis Clench, 1942
- Conus capricorni Van Mol, Tursch & Kenp, 1967
- Conus centurio Born, 1778
- Conus dominicanus Hwass, 1782
- Conus erminius Born, 1778
- Conus fostery Clench & Aguayo, 1942
- Conus granulatus Linnaeus, 1758
- Conus jaspideus Gmelin, 1791
  - Conus jaspideus pygmaeus Reeve, 1844
- Conus juliae Clench, 1942
- Conus multiliratus mukltiliratus Bose, 1906
- Conus mus Hwass, 1792
- Conus patricius Hinds, 1843
- Conus puncticulatus Hwass, 1792
- Conus regius Gmelin, 1791
- Conus spurius Gmelin, 1791
  - Conus spurius atlanticus Clench, 1942
- Conus stimpson Dall, 1902
- Conus villepini Fischer & Bernardi, 1857
- Conus vitatus Hwass in Bruguière, 1792

==== Drilliidae ====
- Agladrillia
- Syntomodrillia biconica Weisbord, 1962
- Syntomodrillia lissotropis Dall
- Pleurotomella

==== Terebridae ====
- Strioerebrum concavum (Say, 1822)
- Strioerebrum dislocatum (Say, 1825)
- Strioerebrum protextum (Conrad, 1845)
- Terebra arca Abbott, 1954
- Terebra cinerea (Born, 1778)
- Terebra dislocata (Say, 1822)
- Terebra hastata (Gmelin 1791)
- Terebra protexta Conrad 1845
- Terebra salleana (Deshayes, 1859)
- Terebra taurina Lightfoot, 1786

=== Superfamily Cylichnoidea ===
==== Cylichnidae ====
- Acteocina bullata (Kiener, 1834)
- Acteocina canaliculata (Say, 1822)
- Acteocina candey (Orbigny, 1842)
- Cylichna caelata (Bush, 1885)

=== Superfamily Cypraeoidea ===
==== Cypraeidae ====
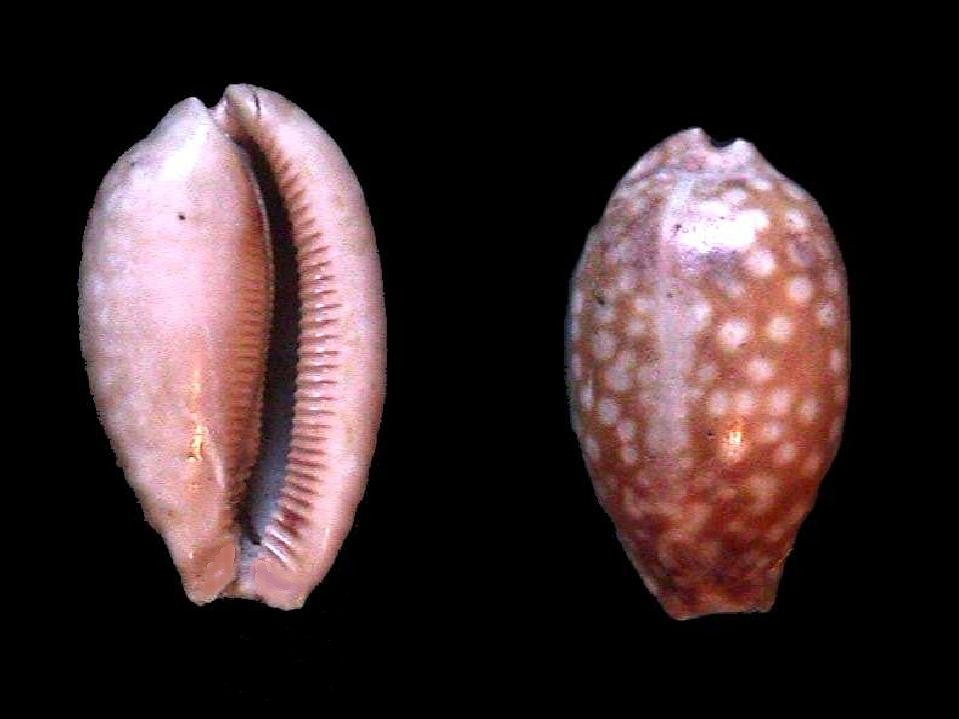
Cypraea zebra

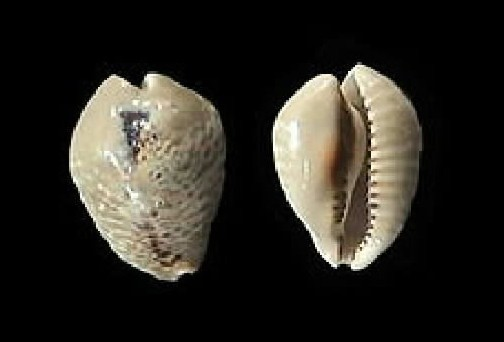
Siphocypraea mus

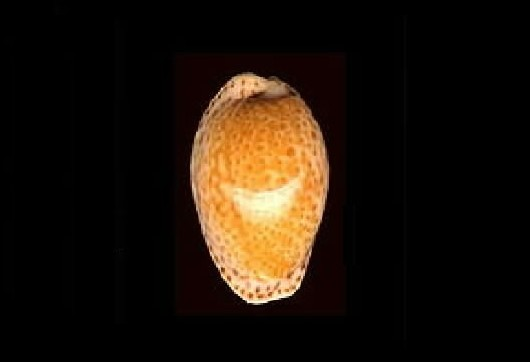
Cypraea spurca acicularis

- Cypraea cinerea Gmelin, 1791
- Cypraea spurca acicularis Gmelin, 1791
- Cypraea zebra Linnaeus, 1758
- Siphocypraea mus Linnaeus, 1758

==== Eratoidae ====
- Trivia candidula Gaskoin, 1835
- Trivia matbiana Schwengel y Mcgynty, 1942
- Trivia pediculus (Linnaeus, 1758)
- Trivia suffusa (Gray, 1832)

==== Ovulidae ====
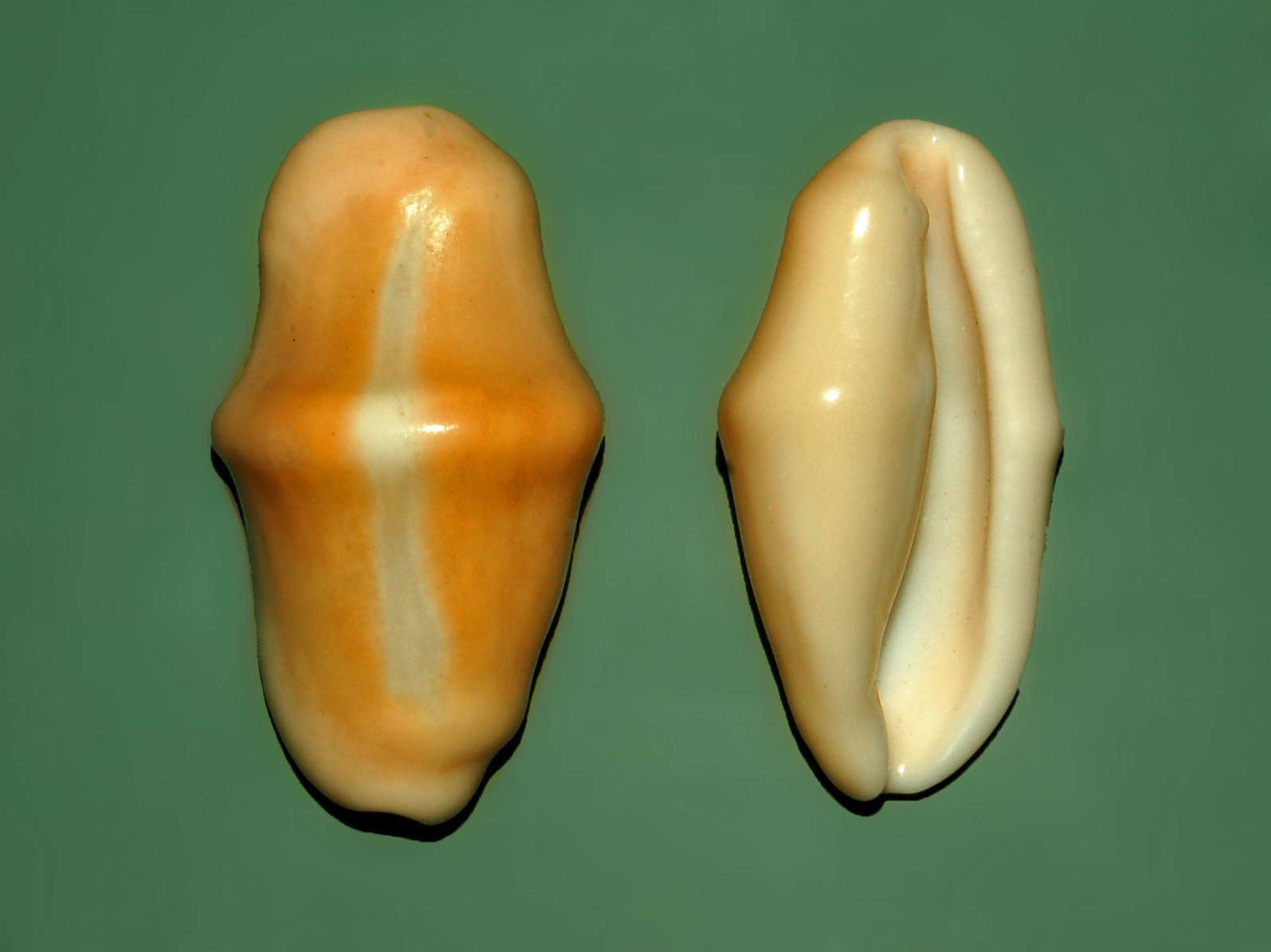
Cyphoma gibbosum

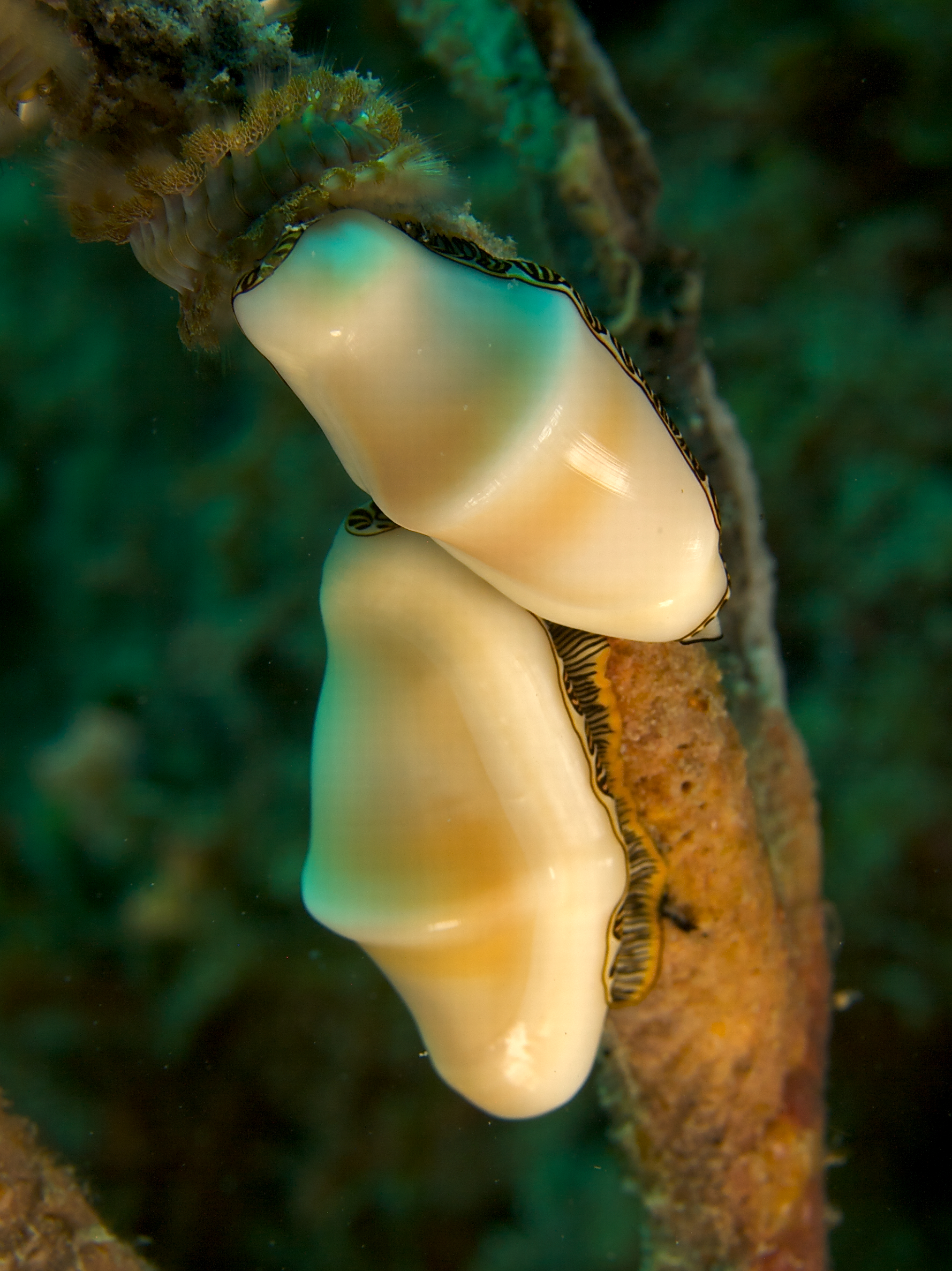
Cyphoma signatum

- Cyphoma intermedium (Sowerby I, 1828)
- Cyphoma gibbosum (Linnaeus, 1758)
- Cyphoma christahemmenae (Fehse, 1997)
- Cyphoma signatum Pilsbry y Mcgynty, 1939
- Cymbovula acicularis (Lamarck, 1810)
- Simnia rufa (Sowerby I, 1832)
- Simnialena uniplicata (Sowerby II, 1848)

=== Superfamily Doridoidea ===
==== Dorididae ====
- Glossodoris bayeri Marcus y Marcus, 1967

=== Superfamily Eoacmaeoidea ===
==== Eoacmaeidae ====
- Eoacmaea pustulata (Helbling, 1779)

=== Superfamily Ellobioidea ===
==== Ellobiidae ====
- Detracia bulloides (Motangu, 1808)
- Melampus coffeus (Linnaeus, 1758)
- Melampus monile (Bruguière, 1789)
- Pedipes mirabilis (Mühlfeld, 1816)
- Tralia ovula (Bruguière, 1789)

=== Superfamily Epitonioidea ===
==== Epitoniidae ====
- Epitonium albidum (d'Orbigny, 1842)
- Epitonium arnoldoi Dall, 1917
- Epitonium denticulatun (Sowerby II, 1844)
- Epitonium lamellosum (Lamarck, 1822)
- Janthina globosa Swainson, 1822
- Scalina mitchelli (Dall, 1896)

=== Superfamily Ficoidea ===
==== Ficidae ====
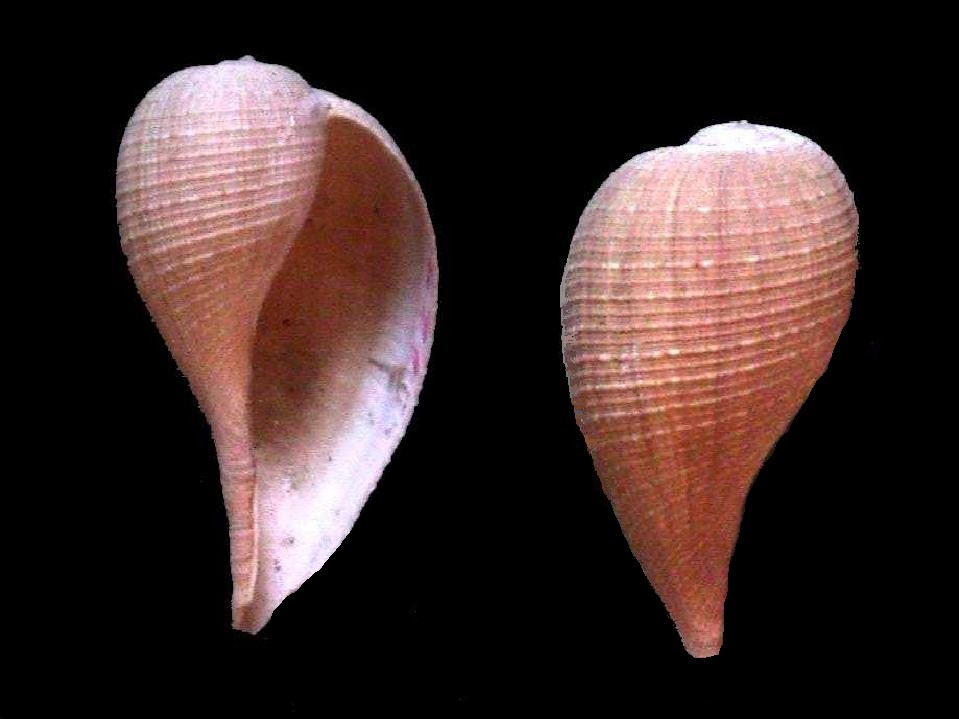
Ficus comunis

- Ficus communis Röding, 1798
- Ficus ventricosus Sowerby I, 1825

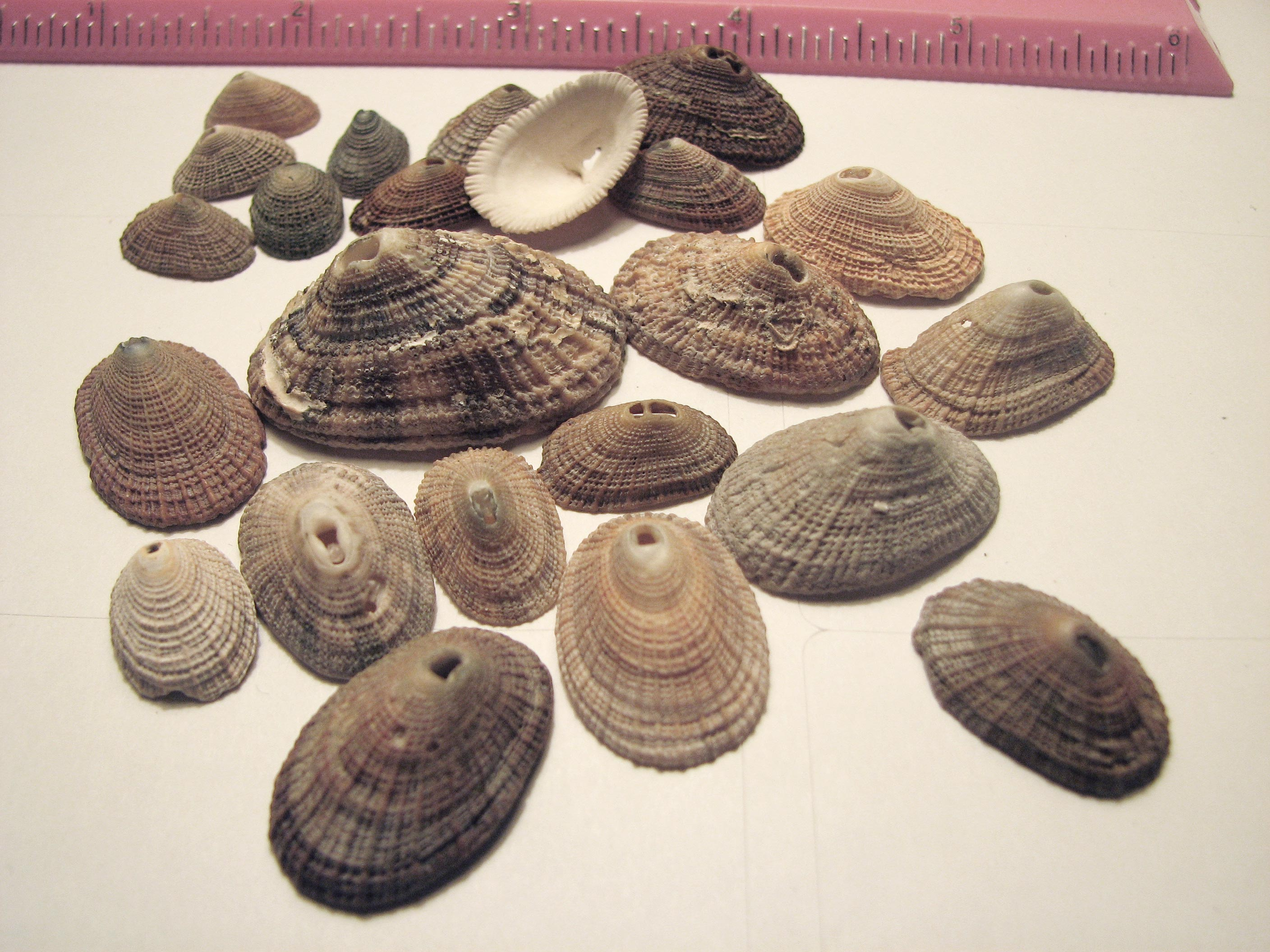
Diodora cayenensis

=== Superfamily Fissurelloidea ===
==== Fissurellidae ====
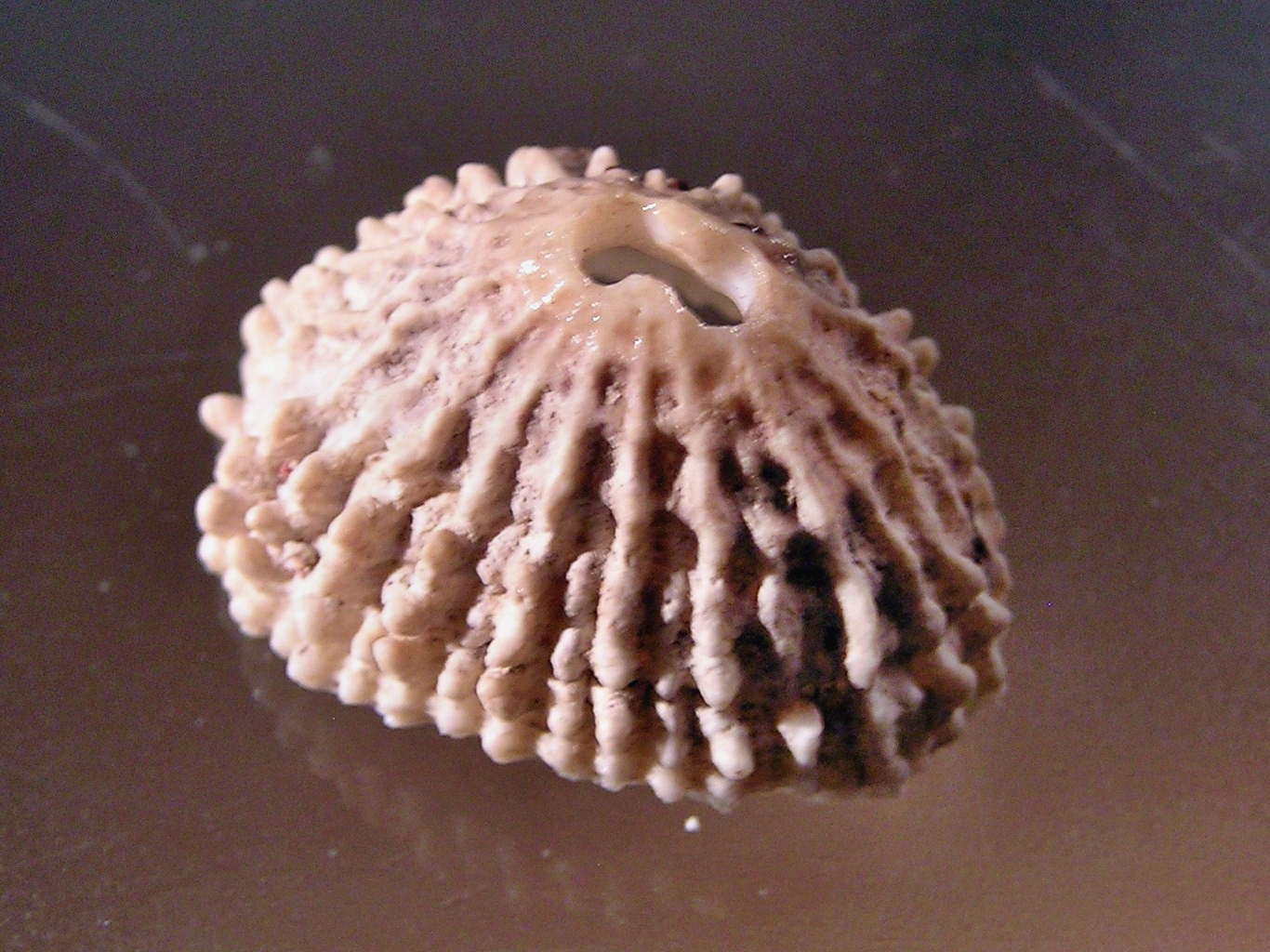
Fissurella nodosa

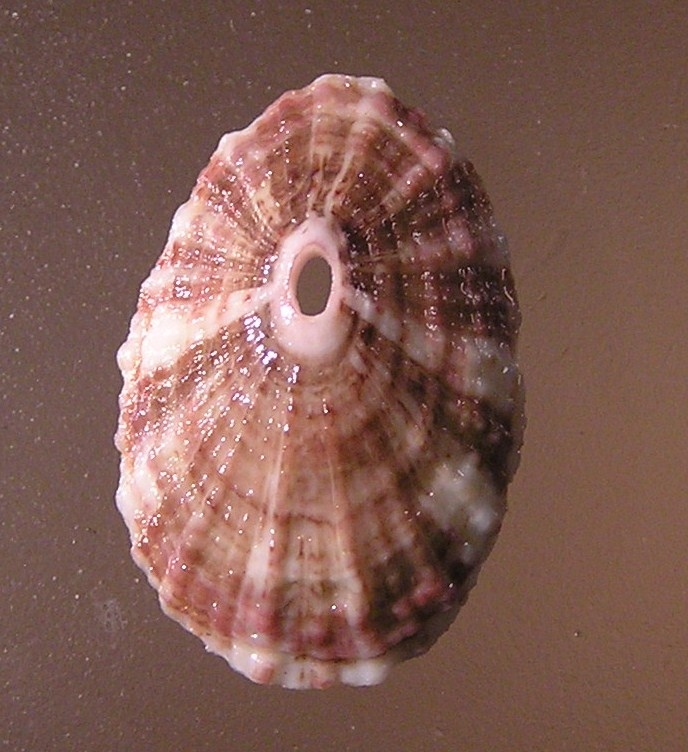
Fissurella rosea

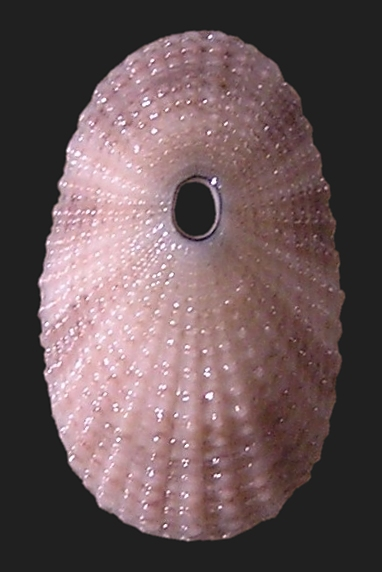
Lucapina suffusa

- Diodora arcuata (Sowerby II, 1862)
- Diodora aspera (Rathke, 1833)
- Diodora cayenensis (Lamarck, 1822)
- Diodora dysoni (Reeve, 1850)
- Diodora jaumei Aguayo y Rehder, 1936
- Diodora listeri (Orbigny, 1842)
- Diodora minuta (Lamark, 1822)
- Diodora sayi (Dall, 1899)
- Diodora variegata (Sowerby II, 1862)
- Diodora viridula (Lamarck, 1822)
- Emarginula pumila (Adams, 1851)
- Emarginula dentigera Heilprin, 1889
- Fissurella angusta Gmelin, 1791
- Fissurella barbadensis Gmelin, 1791
- Fissurella fascicularis Lamark, 1822
- Fissurella nimbosa Linnaeus, 1758
- Fissurella nodosa (Born, 1778)
- Fissurella rosea (Gmelin, 1796)
- Hemitoma octoradiata (Gmelin, 1791)
- Lucapina philippiana (Finlay, 1930)
- Lucapina sowerbii (Sowerby I, 1835)
- Lucapina suffusa (Reeve, 1850)
- Lucapinella henseli (Von Martens, 1890)
- Lucapinella limatula (Reeve, 1850)

=== Superfamily Haliotoidea ===
==== Haliotidae ====
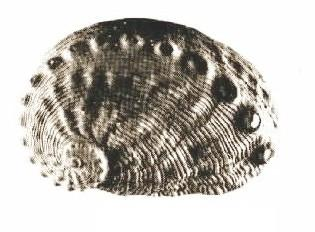
Haliotis pourtalesii

- Haliotis pourtalesii Dall, 1881

=== Superfamily Haminoeoidea ===
==== Haminoeidae ====
- Atys riiseana (Mörch, 1875)
- Atys sharpi Vannata 1901

==== Haminoeidae ====
- Haminoea antillarum (Orbigny, 1841)
- Haminoea elegans (Gray, 1925)
- Haminoea succinea (Conrad, 1846)
- Scaphander watsoni Dall, 1869

=== Superfamily Littorinoidea ===
==== Littorinidae ====
- Albania auberiana (Orbigny, 1842)
- Cingula floridana (Rheder, 1943)
- Cingula floridana (Pfeiffer, 1839)
- Littoraria angulifera (Lamarck, 1822)
- Echinolittorina angustior Mörch, 1876
- Littoraria flava King & Broderip, 1832
- Echinolittorina lineolata Orbigny, 1840
- Echinolittorina meleagris (Potiez y Michaud, 1838)
- Littoraria nebulosa (Lamarck, 1822)
- Littorina tesellata Philippi, 1847
- Echinolittorina ziczac (Gmelin, 1791) - zebra periwinkle
- Echinolittorina tuberculata (Menke, 1828)
- Schwartziella bryerea (Montagu, 1803)
- Phosinella cancellata (Philippi, 1847)
- Zebinella decussata (Montagu, 1803)
- Cenchritis muricatus (Linnaeus, 1758)
- Truncatella caribaeensis Reeve, 1842
- Zebina browniana (Orbigny, 1842)

==== Naticidae ====
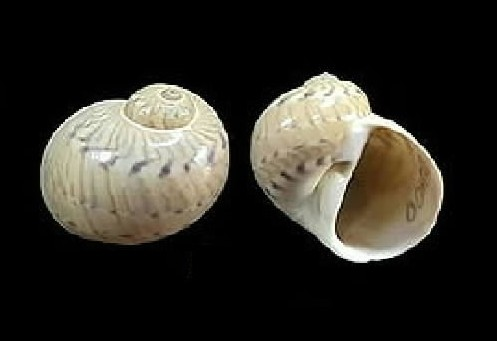
Naticarius canrena

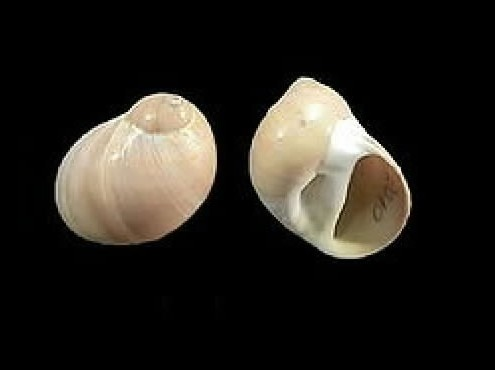
Polinices lacteus

- Natica marochiensis (Gmelin, 1791)
- Naticarius canrena (Linnaeus, 1758)
- Polinices hepaticus (Röding, 1798)
- Polinices lacteus (Guilding, 1834)
- Sinum maculatum (Say, 1831)
- Sinum perspectivum (Say, 1831)
- Stigmaulax cayennensis Récluz, 1850
- Stigmaulax sulcatus (Born, 1778)
- Tectonatica pusilla Say, 1822

==== Nassariidae ====
- Phrontis alba Say, 1822
- Nassarius coppingeri (Smith, 1881)
- Phrontis karinae Nowell-Usticke, 1959

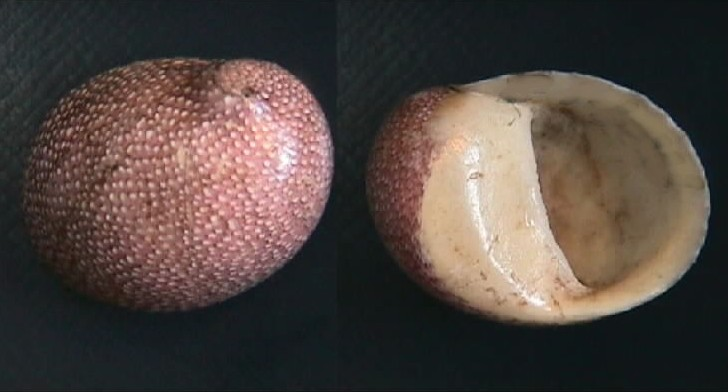
Neritina puncticulata

- Phrontis polygonata Lamarck, 1822
- Phrontis vibex (Say, 1822)
- Pallacera unicinta (Say, 1826)

=== Superfamily Lottioidea ===
==== Lottiidae ====
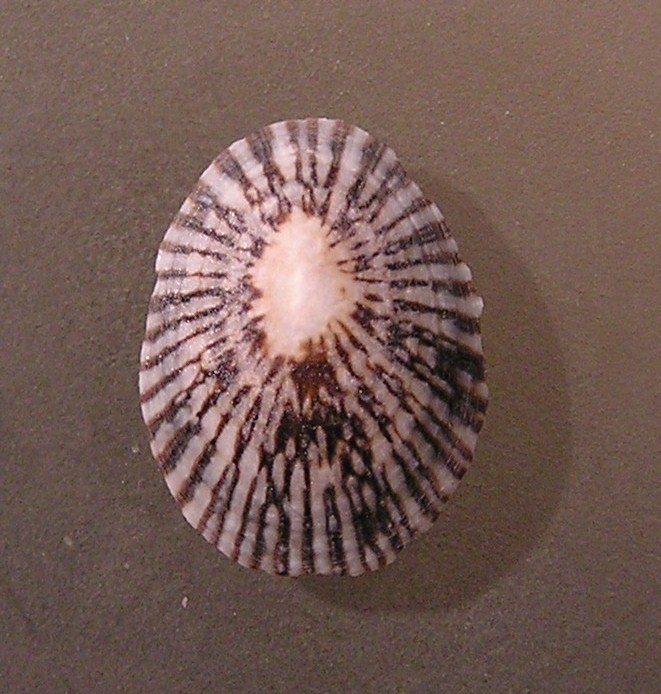
Lottia antillarum

- Lottia albicosta (Adams, 1845)
- Lottia antillarum (G.B. Sowerby I, 1831) - Antilles limpet
- Lottia jamaicensis (Gmelin, 1791)
- Lottia leucopleura (Gmelin, 1791)

=== Superfamily Muricoidea ===
==== Muricidae ====
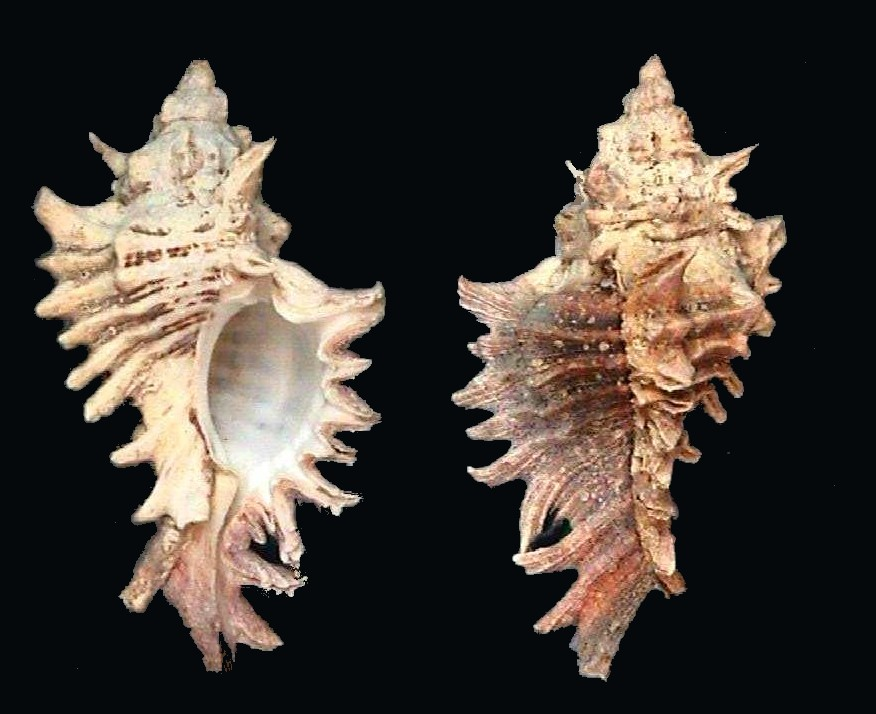
Chicoreus brevifrons

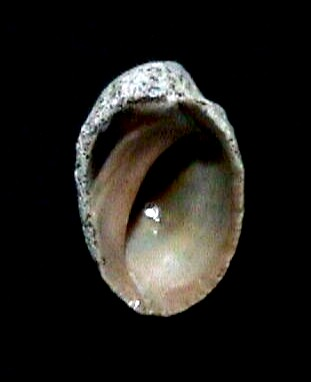
Puerpura patula

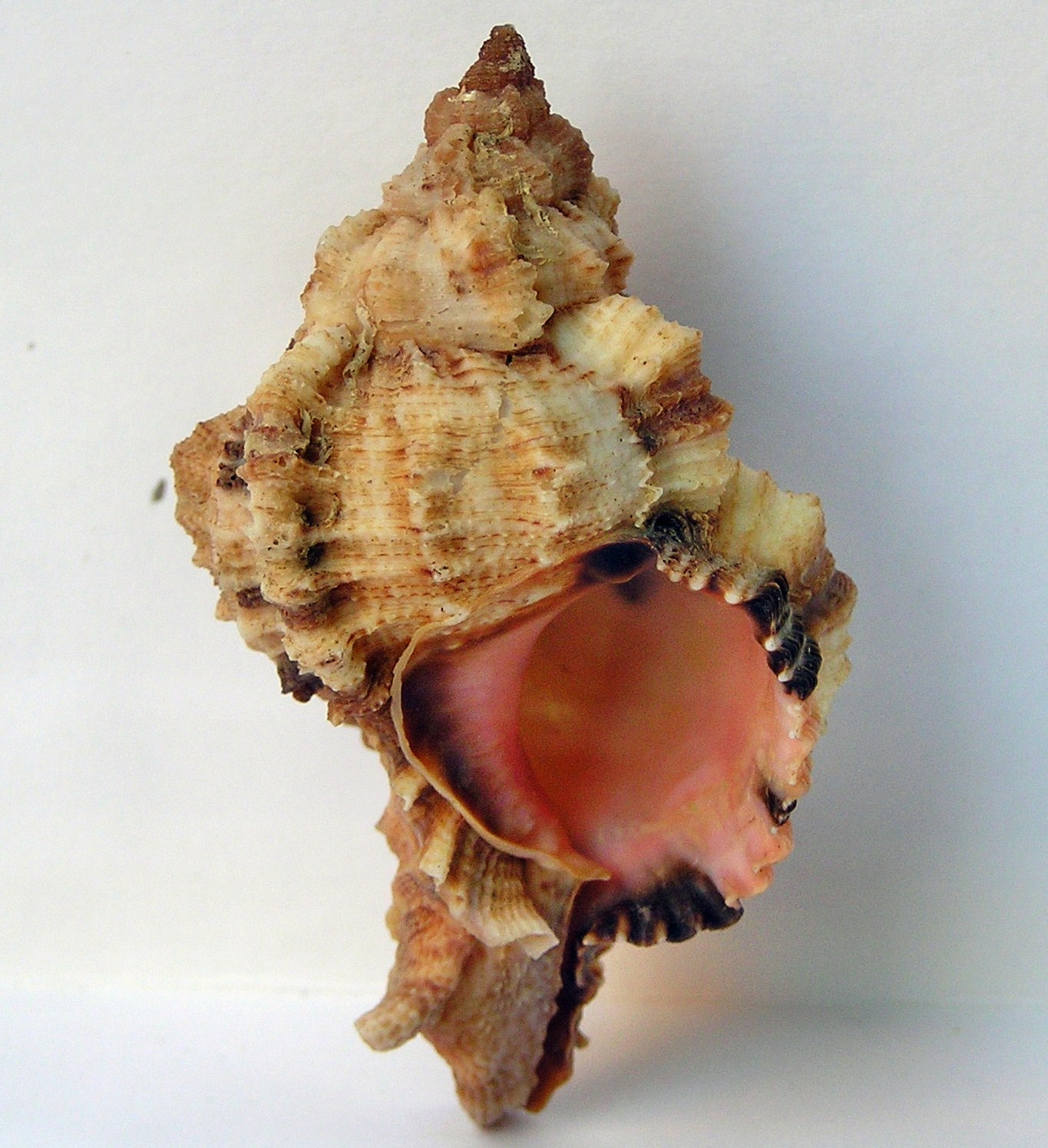
Phyllonotus pomum

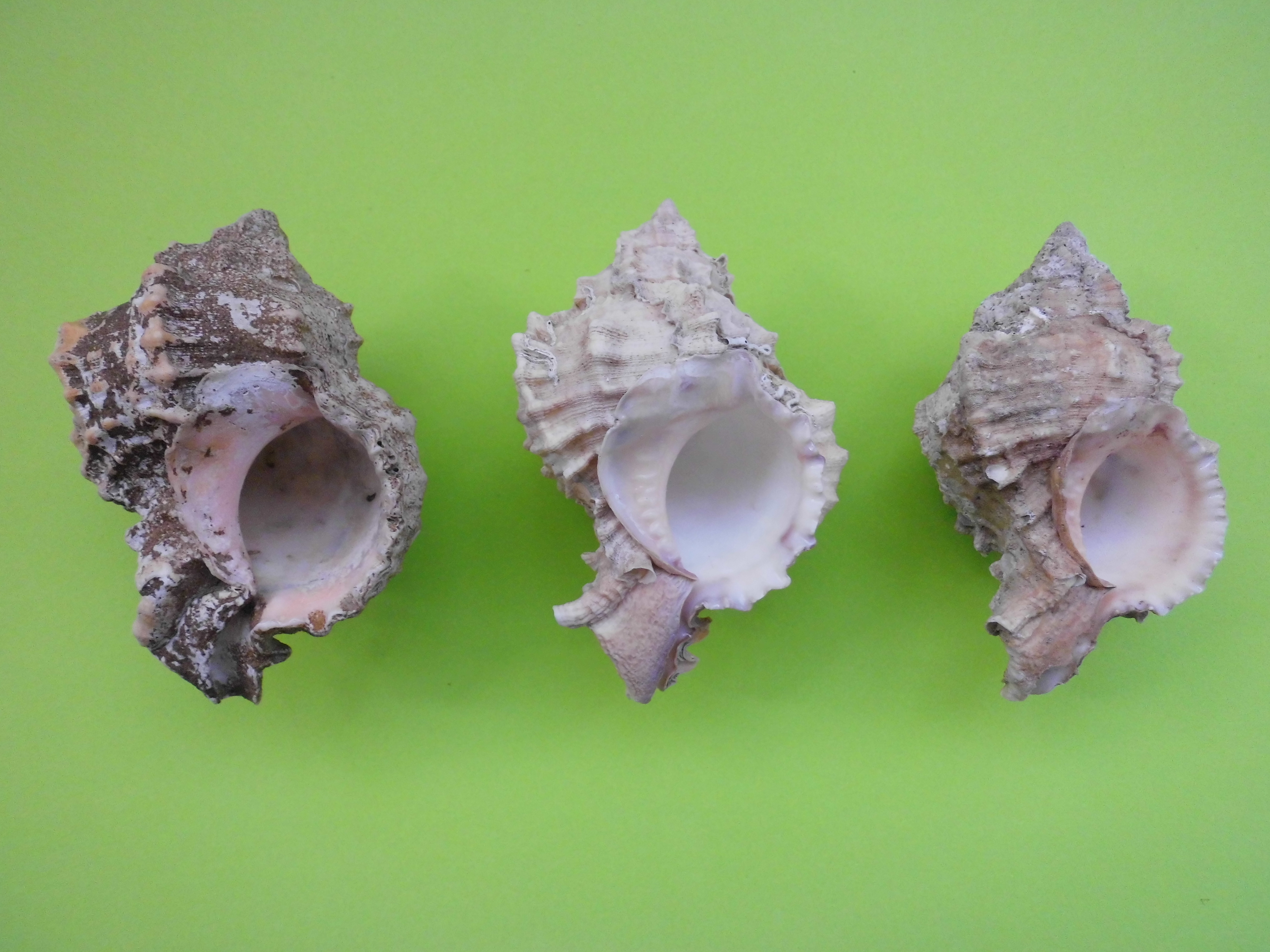
Phyllonotus margaritensis

- Babelomurex mansfieldi (McGinty, 1940)
- Calotrophon ostrearum (Conrad, 1846)
- Calotrophon velero (Vokes, 1970)
- Chicoreus brevifrons Lamarck, 1822
- Chicoreus spectrum (Reeve, 1846)
- Claremontiella nodulosa (Adams, 1845)
- Coralliophila caribaea Abbott, 1958
- Coralliophila erosa (Röding, 1822)
- Dermomurex pauperculus (Adams, 1850) - little aspella
- Favartia alveata (Kiener, 1842)
- Favartia cellulosa (Conrad, 1846)
- Favartia macgintyi M. Smith, 1938
- Mexacanthina angelica Oldroyd, 1918<
- Morutla gilbertharrisi (Weisbord, 1962)
- Murex erhysostoma Sowerby II, 1834
- Murex olssoni Vokes, 1967
- Muricopsis perexigua (Maury, 1917)
- Muricopsis rosea (Reeve, 1856)
- Muricopsis rosea (Reeve, 1856)
- Ocenebra intermedia (Adams, 1850)
- Phyllonotus margaritensis Abbott, 1958
- Phyllonotus margaritensis Abbott, 1958
- Phyllonotus pomum Gmelin, 1791
- Plicopurpura patula Linnaeus, 1758
- Poirieria recticanlis (Weisbord, 1962)
- Siratus beauii (Fisher & Bernarldi 1957)
- Siratus formosus Sowerby II, 1841
- Siratus springeri Bullis, 1964
- Stramonita floridana (Conrad, 1837)
- Stramonita haemastoma (Linnaeus, 1767)
- Stramonita haemastoma Linnaeus, 1767)
- Thais melones (Duclos, 1832)
- Thais rustica (Lamarck, 1822)
- Thaisella coronata (Guppy, 1869)
- Trachypollia didyma (Schwengel, 1943)
- Typhina belcheri (Broderip, 1833)
- Typhina expansa Sowerby II, 1874
- Typhis bullasi (Gertman, 1969)
- Vasula deltoidea (Lamarck, 1822)
- Vokesimurex cabritii (Bemardi, 1859) - Cabrit's murex
- Vokesimurex chrysostoma Sowerby II, 1834 - gold-mouthed murex
- Vokesimurex donmoorei (Bullis, 1964)
- Vokesimurex messorius Sowerby II, 1841 - Mesorius murex
- Vokesimurex recurvirostris (Broderip, 1832) - bent-beak murex

=== Superfamily Mitroidea ===
==== Mitridae ====
- Neotiara nodulosa (Gmelin, 1791)

=== Neogastropoda ===
==== Babyloniidae ====
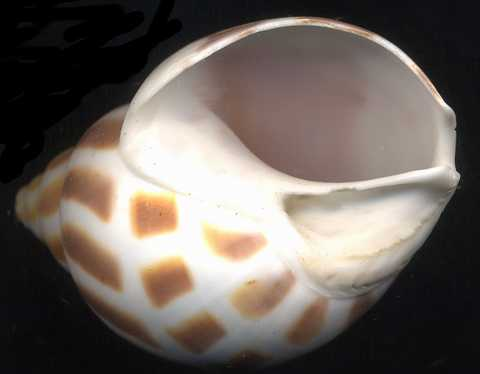
Babylonia areolata (introduced)

- Babylonia areolata (Link, 1807) (Introduced species)

=== Superfamily Neritoidea ===
==== Neritidae ====
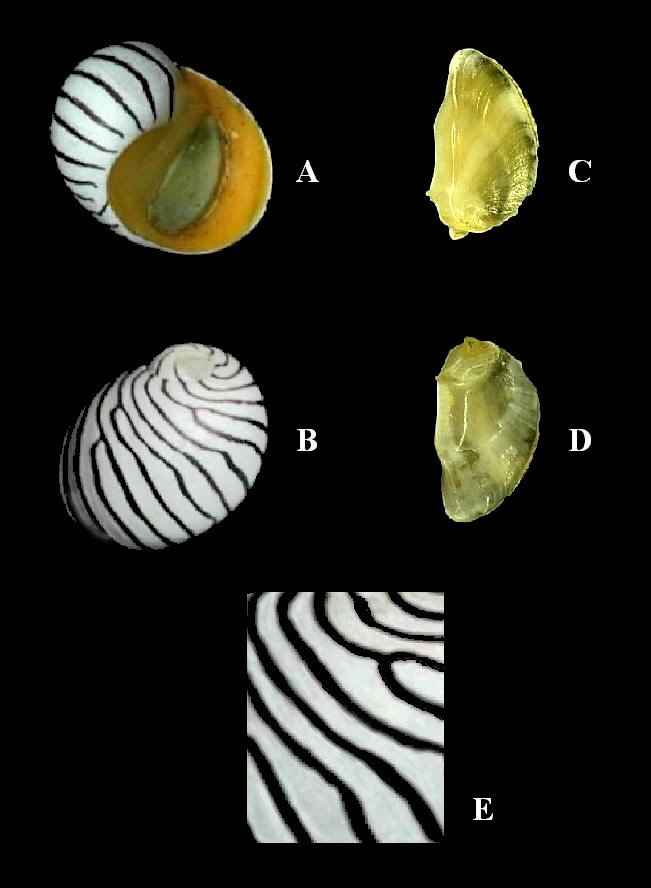
Puperita pupa

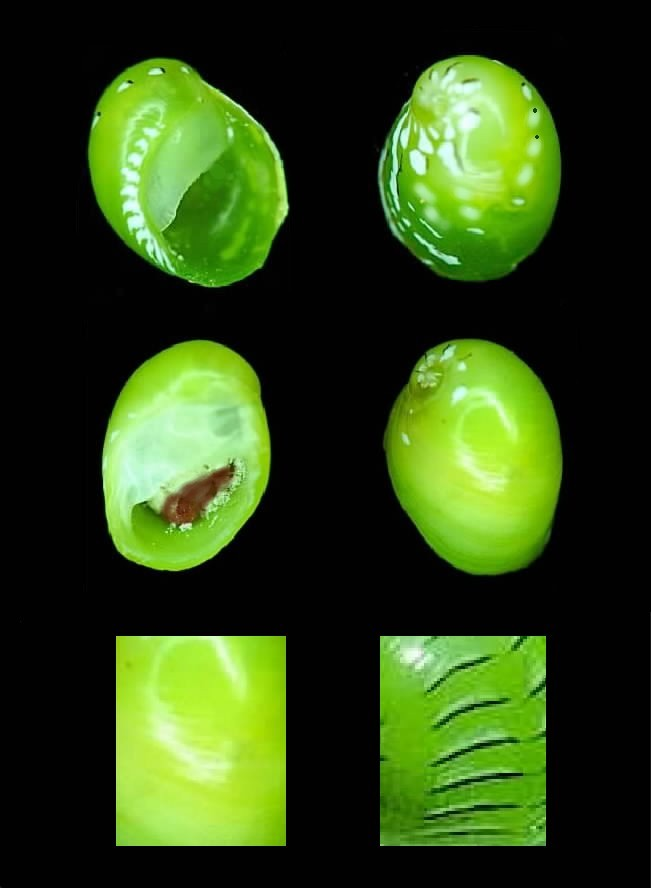
Smaragdia viridis

- Nerita amplisulcata Macsotay & Campos, 2001
- Nerita fulgurans Gmelin, 1791
- Nerita peloronta Linnaeus, 1758 - bleeding tooth nerite
- Nerita tessellata Gmelin, 1791 - checkered nerite
- Nerita versicolor Gmelin, 1791
- Vitta meleagris Lamarck, 1822
- Vitta piratica Russel, 1940
- Vitta usnea (Say, 1822)
- Vitta virginea (Linnaeus, 1758) - virgin nerite
- Nereina punctulata (Lamarck, 1816)
- Puperita pupa (Linnaeus, 1767) - zebra nerite
- Smaragdia viridis (Linnaeus, 1758) - emerald nerite

==== Phenacolepadidae ====
- Plesiothyreus hamillei (Fischer, 1857)

=== Superfamily Olivoidea ===
==== Olividae ====
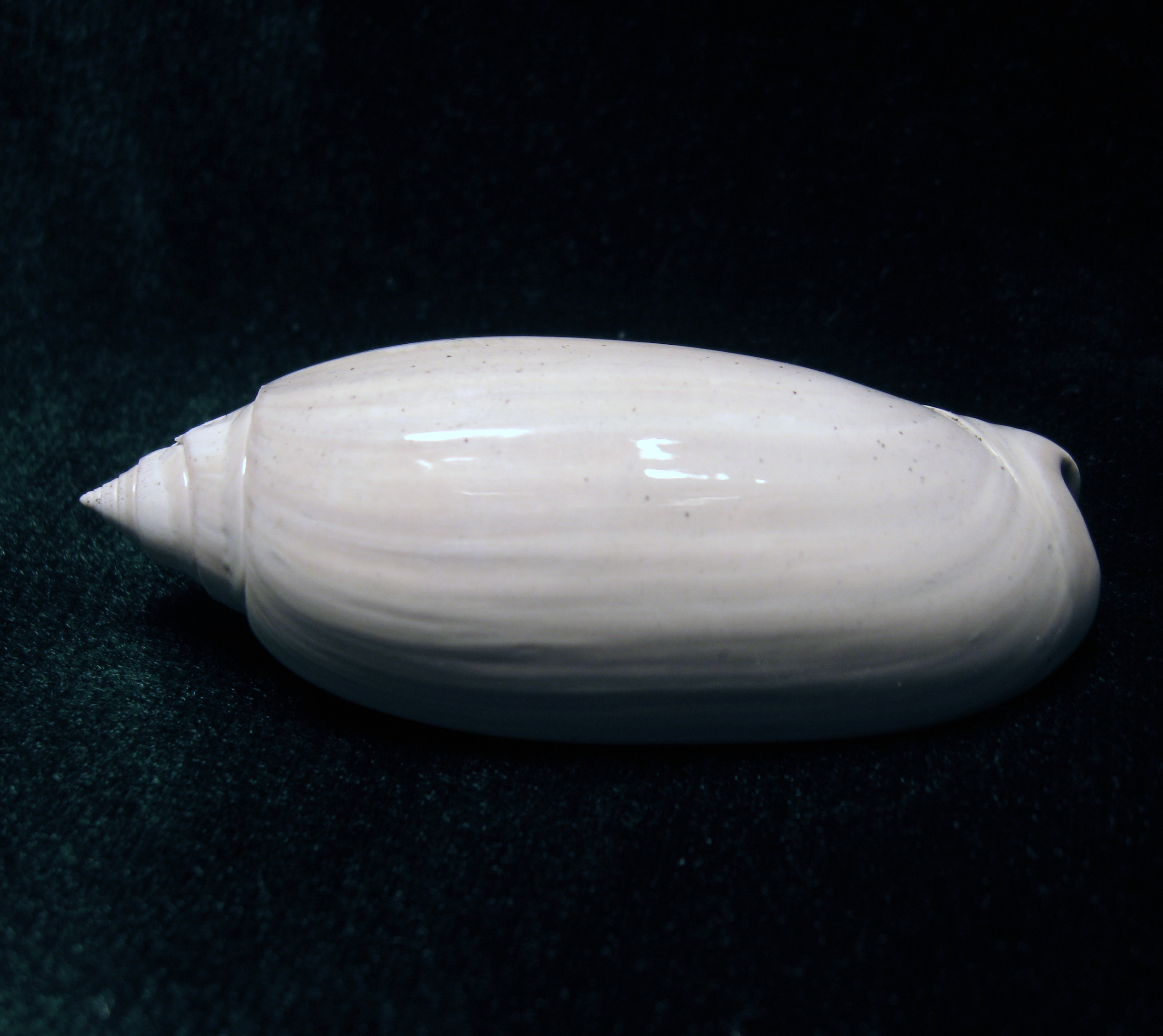
Oliva sayana

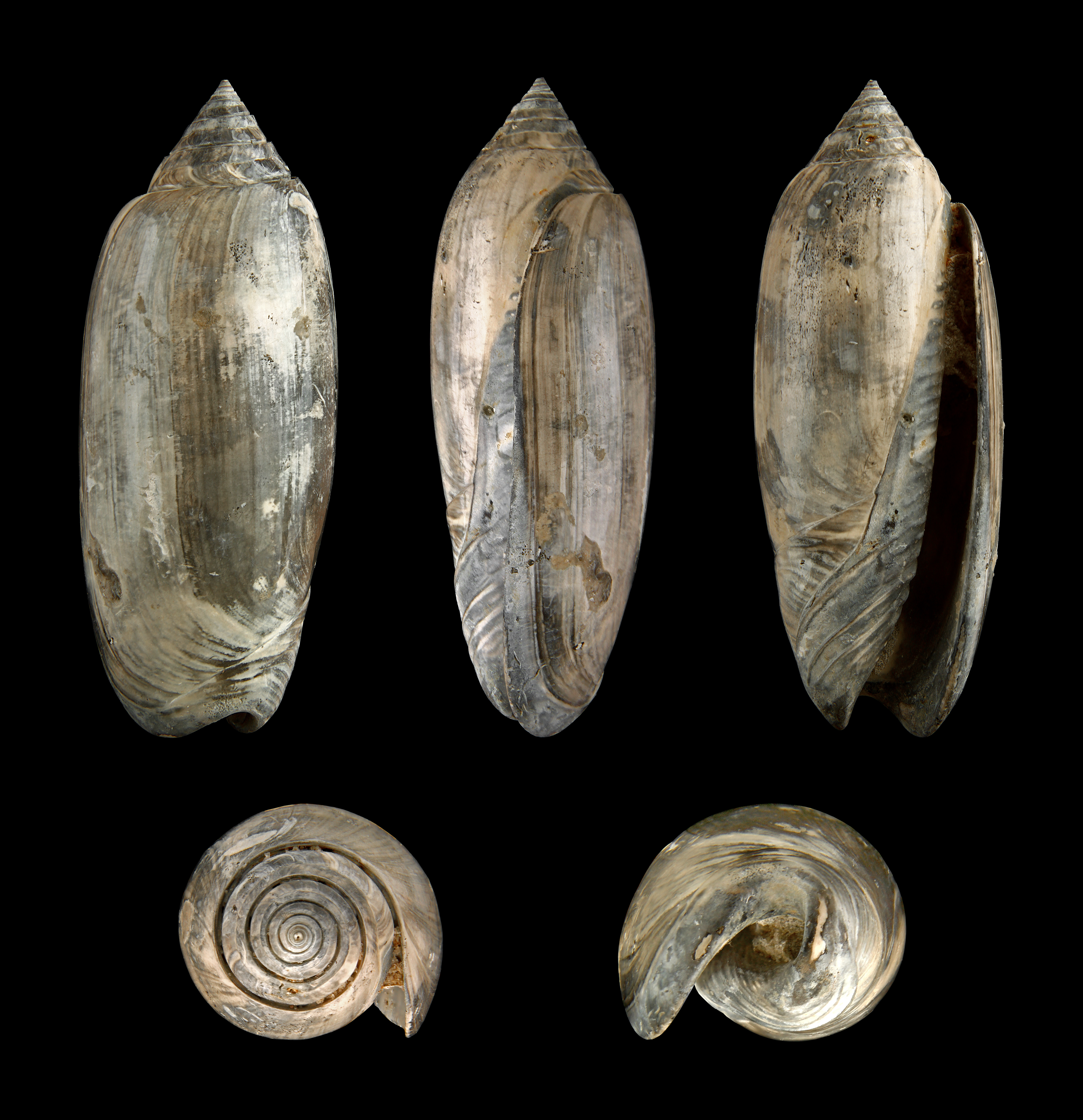
Oliva sayana

- Eburna glabrata (Linnaeus, 1758)
- Amalda tankervillii (Linnaeus, 1758)
- Jaspidella jaspidea (Gmelin, 1791)
- Americoliva sayana Ravanel, 1834 - lettered olive
- Oliva scripta Lamarck, 1811
- Oliva reticularis (Lamarck, 1810) - netted olive
- Oliva semmelinki Weisbord, 1962
- Olivella acteocina Olson 1956
- Olivella fundarugata Weisbord, 1962
- Olivella kifos Macsotay & Campos, 2001
- Olivella lactea (Marrat, 1871)
- Olivella mica (Reeve, 1850)
- Olivella minuta (Link, 1807) - minute dwarf olive
- Olivella mutica (Say, 1822) - variable dwarf olive
- Olivella nivea (Gmelin, 1791) - snowy dwarf olive
- Olivella perplexa Olson 1956

=== Superfamily Philinoidea ===
==== Philinidae ====
- Philine sagra (Orbigny, 1842)

=== Superfamily Pyramidelloidea ===
==== Amathinidae ====
- Iselica globosa (H. C. Lea, 1843)

==== Pyramidellidae ====
- Odostomia mareana Weisbord, 1962
- Fargoa bartschi Stimpson, 1851
- Longchaeus candidus (Mörch, 1875)
- Pyramidella dolabrata Linnaeus, 1758 - giant Atlantic pyram
- Turbonilla hemphilli Bush, 1899

=== Superfamily Ringiculoidea ===
==== Ringiculidae ====
- Ringicula semistriata (Orbigny, 1842)

=== Superfamily Rissooidea ===
==== Rissoinidae ====
- Alvania auberiana (Orbigny, 1842) - West Indian alvania
- Phosinella cancellata (Philippi, 1847)
- Schwartziella fischeri (Desjardin, 1949)
- Schwartziella bryerea (Montagu, 1803)
- Zebinella decussata (Montagu, 1803)
- Zebina browniana (Orbigny, 1842)

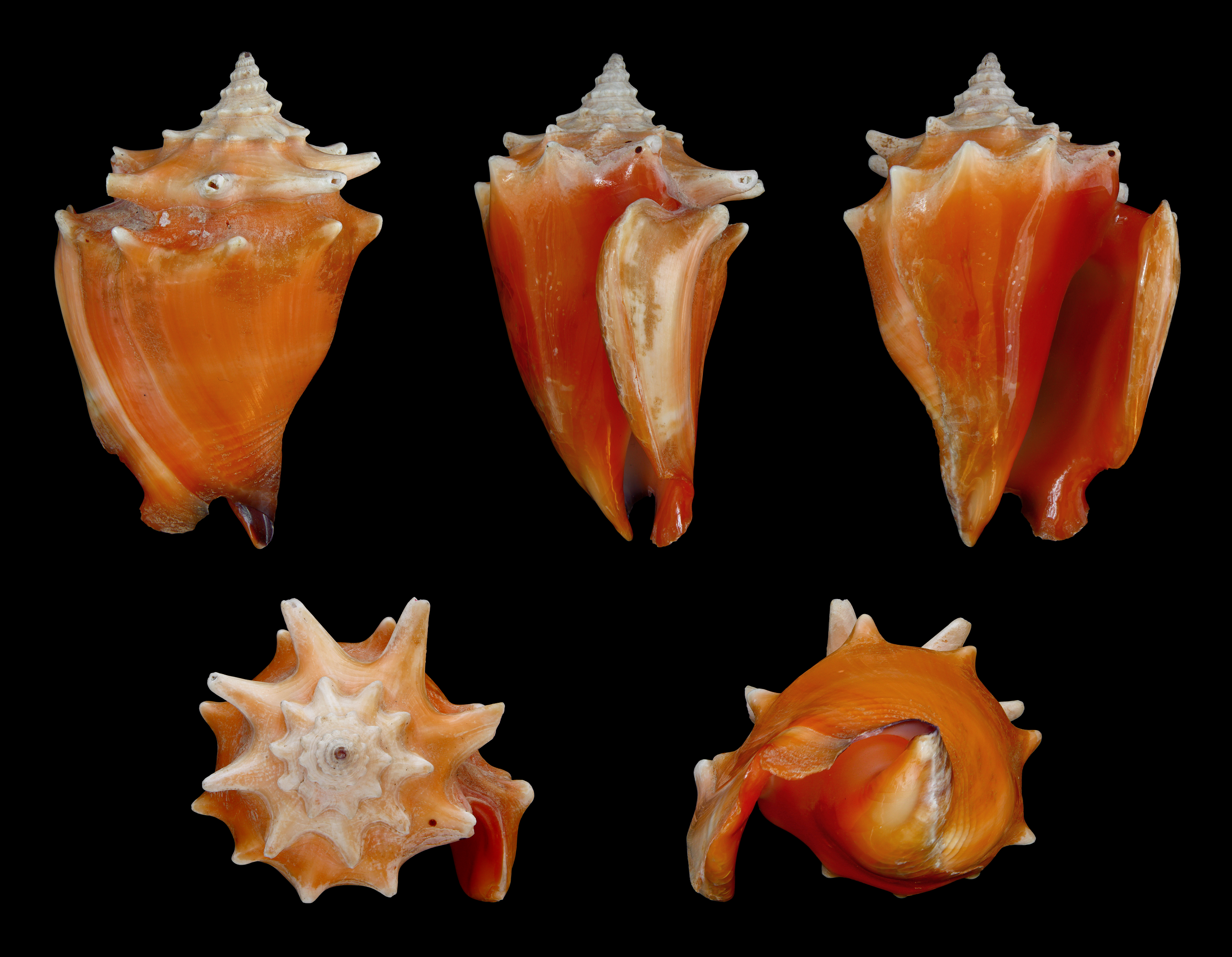
Strombus pugilis

=== Superfamily Scissurelloidea ===
==== Scissurellidae ====
- Anatoma proxima (Dall 1927)

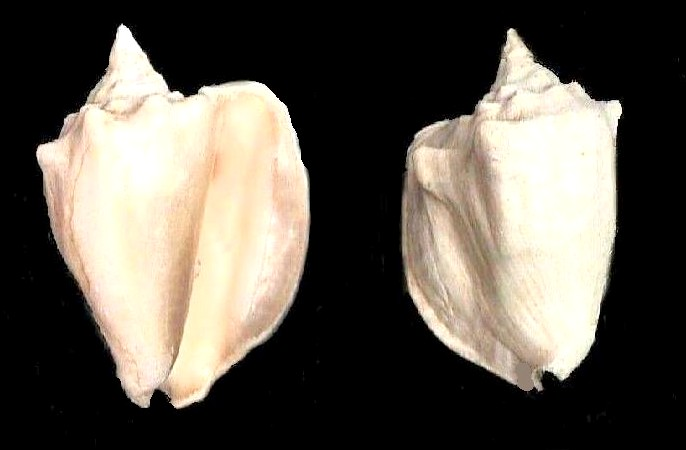
Lobatus costatus

==== Siphonariidae ====
- Siphonaria alternata (Say, 1826)
- Siphonaria naufragum (Stearns, 1872)
- Siphonaria pectinata (Linnaeus, 1758) - striped false limpet

=== Superfamily Stromboidea ===
==== Strombidae ====
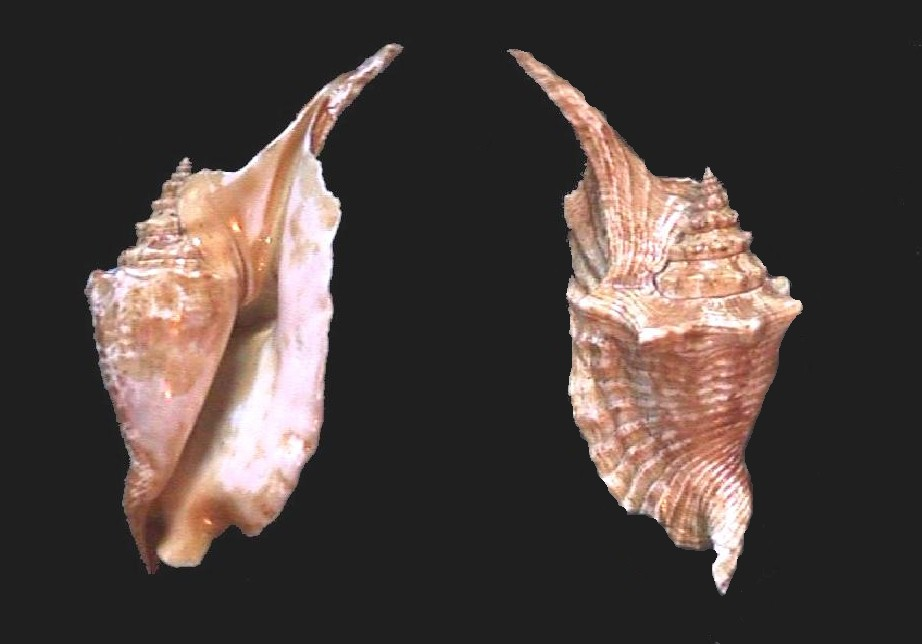
Lobatus gallus

- Macrostrombus costatus (Gmelin, 1791) - milk conch
- Aliger gallus (Linnaeus, 1758) - rooster conch
- Aliger gigas (Linnaeus, 1758) - queen conch
- Lobatus raninus (Gmelin, 1791) - hawk-wing conch
- Strombus pugilis Linnaeus, 1758 - fighting conch
  - Strombus pugilis nicaraguensis Fluck, 1905

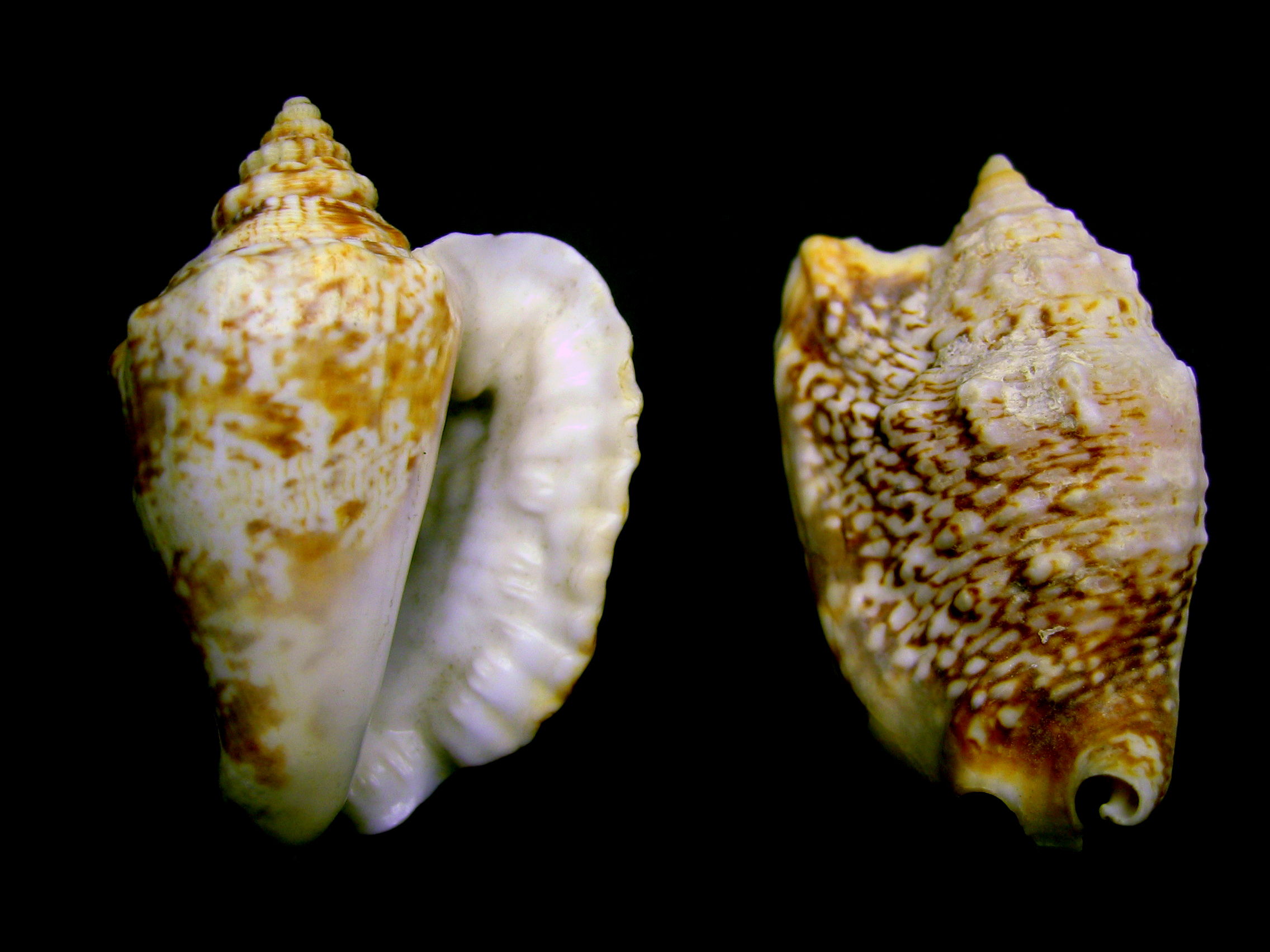
Lobatus raninus

=== Superfamily Tonnoidea ===
==== Bursidae ====
- Alanbeuella corrugata (Perry, 1811) - gaudy frog shell
- Bursa spadicea (Momfort, 1810)
- Bursa bufonia (Gmelin, 1791) - warty frog shell
- Dulcerana granularis (Orbigny, 1842) - granular frog shell
  - Dulcerana granularis cubaniana (Orbigny, 1842)

==== Cassidae ====
- Cassis flammea (Linnaeus, 1758)
- Cassis madagascariensis Lamarck, 1822 - queen helmet
- Cassis tuberosa (Linnaeus, 1758) - king helmet
- Cypraecassis testiculus (Linnaeus, 1758) - reticulated cowry helmet
- Dalium solidum (Dall, 1889)
- Morum dennisoni Reeve, 1844 - Dennison's morum
- Morum dennison Meuschen, 1787
- Phalium granulatum (Born, 1778) - Scotch bonnet
- Sconsia grayi (Lamarck, 1816)

==== Cymatiidae ====
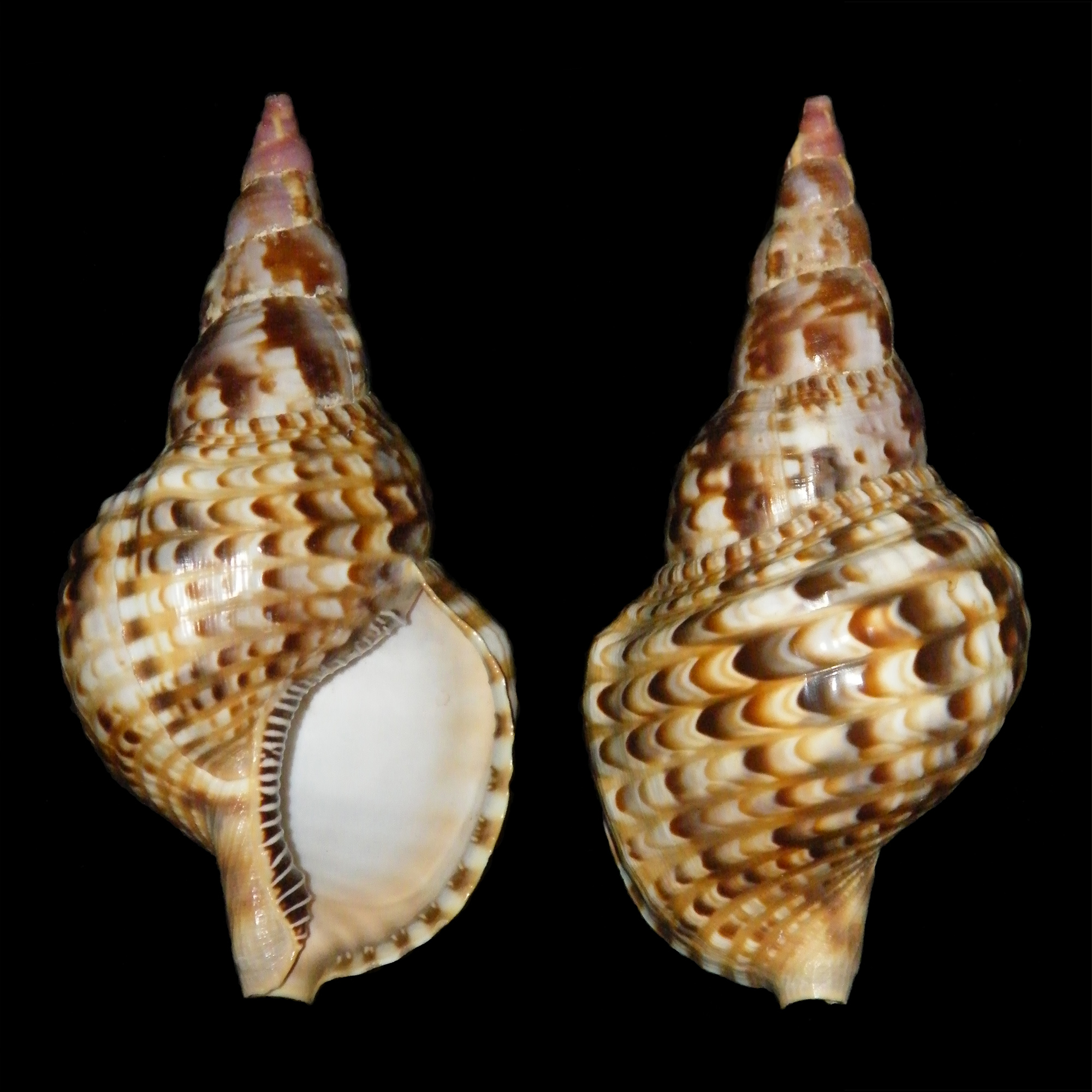
Charonia variegata

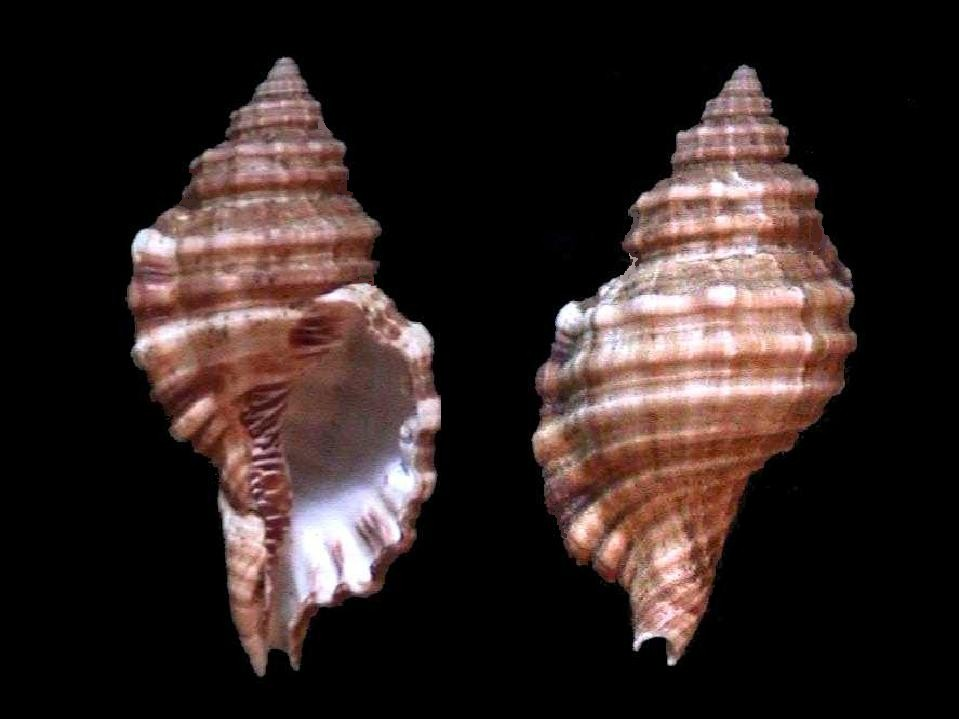
Cymatium femorale

- Cymatium etcheversi Macsotay & Campos 2001a
- Cymatium femorale (Linnaeus, 1758)
- Distorsio clathrata (Lamarck, 1816) - Atlantic distorsio
- Gutturnium muricinum (Röding, 1798) - knobbly triton
- Linatella caudata (Gmelin, 1791) - girdled triton
- Monoplex krebsii (Mörch, 1877)
- Monoplex nicobaricus (Röding, 1798) - goldmouth triton
- Monoplex parthenopeus (Von Salis, 1793) - giant hairy triton
- Monoplex pilearis (Linnaeus, 1758) - hairy triton
  - Monoplex pilearis martinianum Orbigny, 1842
- Monoplex vespaceus (Lamarck, 1822) - dwarf hairy triton
- Ranularia cynocephala (Lamarck, 1816)
- Turritriton labiosus Wood, 1828

==== Tonnidae ====
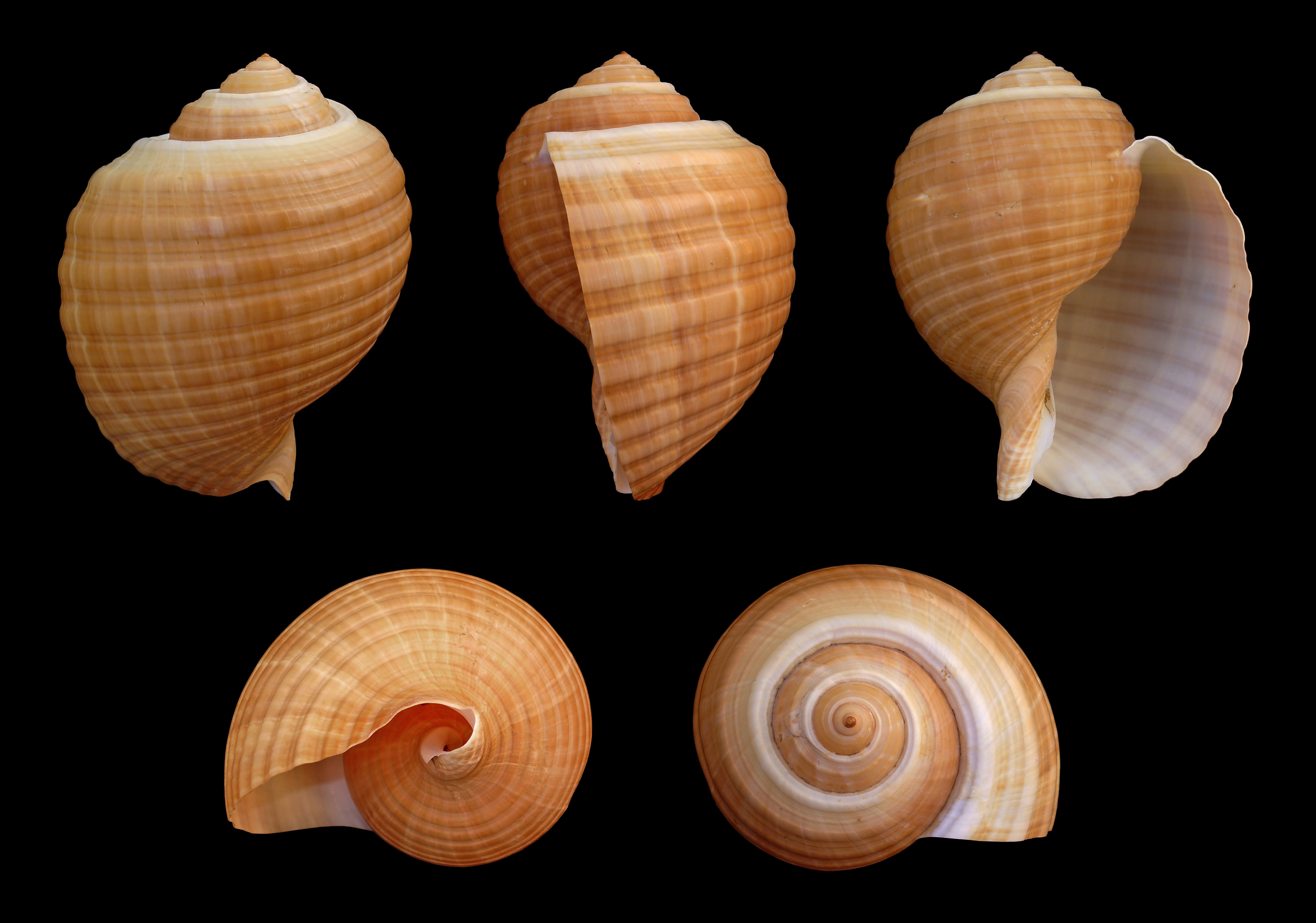
Tonna maculosa

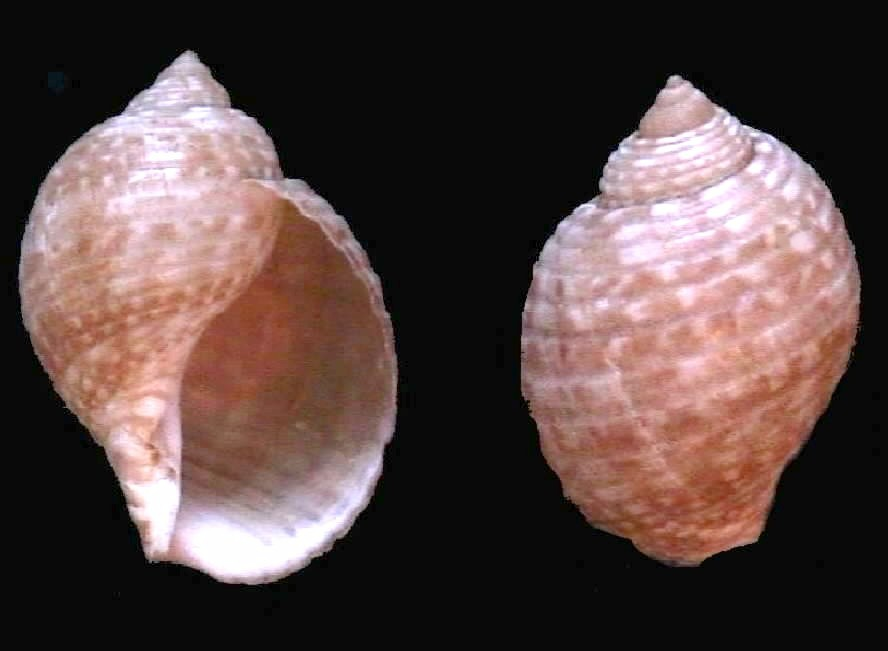
Tonna maculosa

- Tonna galea (Linnaeus, 1758) - giant tun
- Tonna pennata (Mörch, 1852) - Atlantic partridge tun

=== Superfamily Truncatelloidea ===
==== Caecidae ====
- Caecum floridanum Stimpson, 1851
- Caecum heptagonum Carpenter, 1858
- Caecum imbricatum Carpenter, 1858
- Caecum pulchellum Stimpson, 1851 - beautiful caecum
- Caecum regulare Carpenter, 1858
- Caecum ryssotitum Folin, 1867 - minute caecum
- Caecum textile Folin, 1867 - textile caecum
- Meioceras cornucopiae Carpenter, 1859
- Meioceras nitidum (Stimpson, 1851)

=== Superfamily Triphoroidea ===
==== Cerithiopsidae ====
- Bittum caraboboense (Weisbord, 1962)
- Bittum caribense (Weisbord, 1962)
- Retilaskeya emersonii (Adams, 1838)
- Cerithiopsis grenii (Adams, 1850)
- Cerithiopsis lata (Adams, 1850)
- Seila adamsii (Orbigny, 1842)

==== Triphoridae ====
- Strobiligera sentoma (Dall, 1927)
- Triphora intermedia (Adams, 1850)
- Triphora ornata (Deshayes, 1832)
- Triphora turristhomae (Holten, 1802)

=== Superfamily Trochoidea ===
==== Areneidae ====
- Arene tricarinata (Stearns, 1872)

==== Phasianellidae ====
- Gabrielona brevis Orbigny, 1842
- Gabrielona bruscasensi Weisbord, 1962
- Eulithidium adamsi (Philippi, 1853)
- Tricolia brevis (Orbigny, 1842)
- Eulithidium affine (Adams, 1850) - polka-dot pheasant
- Eulithidium thalassicola Robertson, 1958 - turtle grass pheasant shell
- Eulithidium tessellatum (Potiez y Hichaud, 1838)

==== Trochidae ====
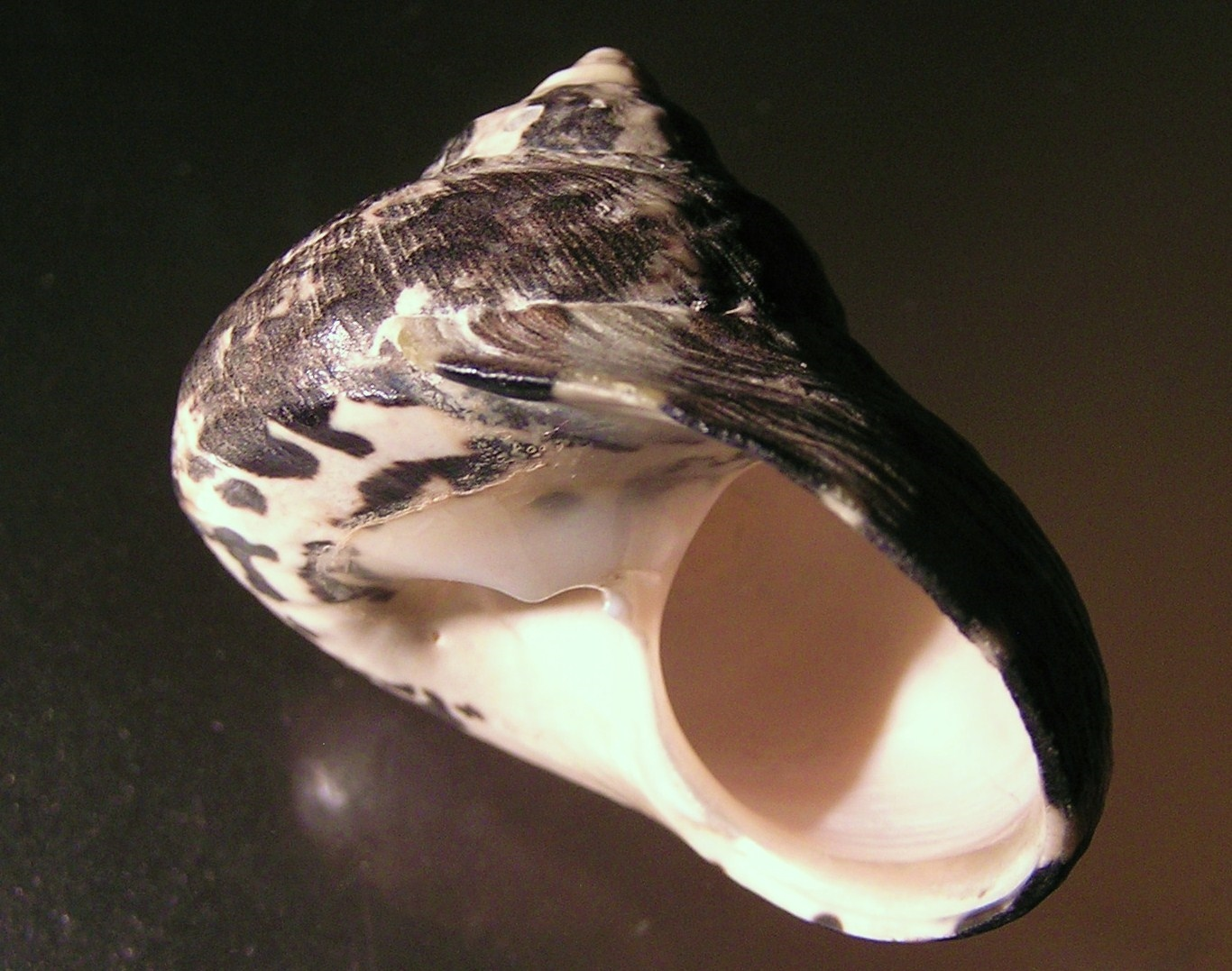
Cittarium pica

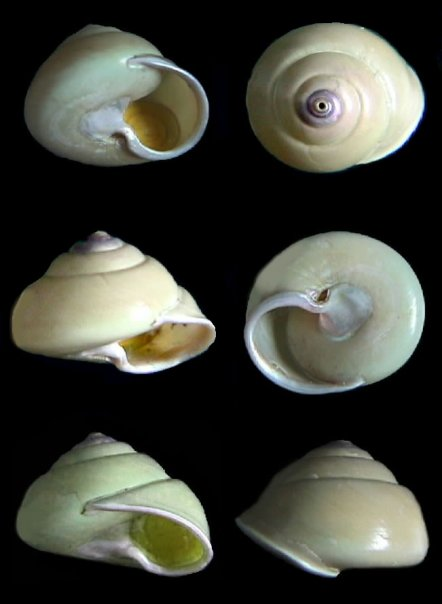
Gaza superba

- Astele hassler (Clench & Aguayo, 1939)
- Astele bullisi (Clench & Turner, 1960)
- Calliostoma adspersum (Philippi, 1851) - spotted Brazilian top shell
- Calliostoma decipiens (Guppy, 1867)
- Calliostoma euglyptum (Adams, 1854) - sculptured top shell
- Calliostoma jujubinum (Gmelin, 1791) - jujube top shell
- Calliostoma pulchrum (Adams, 1850) - beautiful top shell
- Calliostoma sarcodum Dall, 1927
- Cittarium pica (Linnaeus, 1758) - magpie shell
- Gaza superba (Dall, 1881) - superb gaza
- Tegula excavata (Lamarck, 1822) - green-based tegula
- Tegula hotessieriana (Orbigny, 1842)
- Tegula puntagordana Weisbord, 1962
- Agathistoma fasciatum (Born, 1778) - smooth Atlantic tegula
- Agathistoma lividomaculatum Adams, 1845
- Agathistoma viridulum (Gmelin, 1791)

==== Turbinidae ====
- Astraea brevispina (Lamarck, 1822)
- Astraea castanea Gmelin, 1791
- Astraea phoebia Röding, 1798
- Astraea tecta americana (Gmelin 1791)
- Astraea tecta tecta (Solander 1786)

- Astraea tuber (Linnaeus, 1767)
  - Astraea tuber venezuelensis (Flores y Cáceres, 1980)
- Liotia variabilis Dall 1889
- Lithopoma caelatum (Gmelin, 1791) - carved star shell
- Turbo canaliculatus Hermann, 1781 - channeled turban
- Turbo castanea Gmelin, 1791 - chestnut turban
- Turbo crenulatus Gmelin 1791

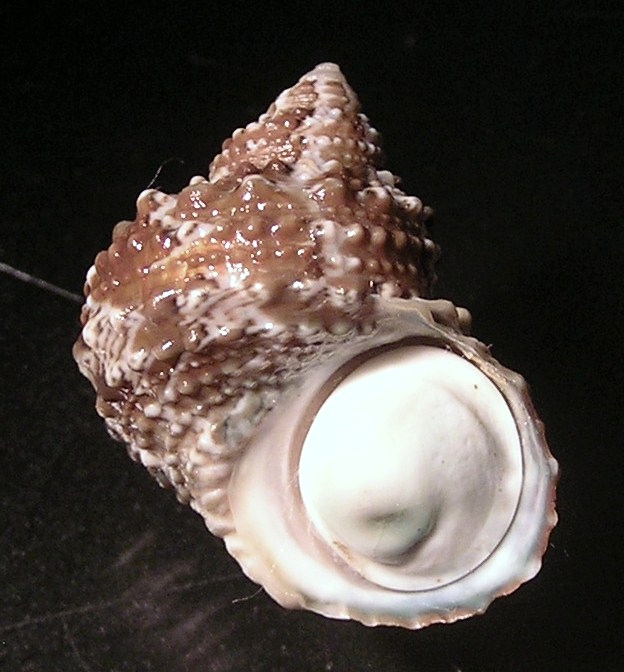
Turbo castanea

Turridae

- Crassispira albomaculata (Orbigny, 1842)
- Crassispira chazaliei (Dautzemberg, 1900)
- Crassispira fuscescens Reeve, 1843
- Knefastia jungi Macsotay & Campos, 2001
- Crassispira leucocyna Dall, 1883
- Daphnella lymneiformis Kiener, 1840 - volute turret
- Drillia albinodonta
- Drillia gibbosa (Born, 1778)
- Fusiturrieula paulettae Princz, 1978
- Hindsiclava consors (Sowerby)
- Knefastia altenai Macsotay & Campos, 2001
- Mangelia melanitica Dall, 1885
- Polystira albida (Perry, 1811) - white giant turris
- Polystira tellea (Dall, 1889)
- Pygrospira ostrearum Stearns, 1872 - oyster turrid
- Agathotoma candidissima (Adams, 1845) - Cox's mangelia

=== Superfamily Truncatelloidea ===
==== Tornidae ====
- Macromphalina floridana Moore, 1965

==== Vitrinellidae ====
- Agatrix smithii (Dall, 1888)
- Circulus multistriatus (A. E. Verrill, 1884)
- Cochliolepis sunrinamensis Altena, 1966
- Cochliopsis parasitica Stimpson, 1858
- Cyclotremiscus caraboboense Weisbord, 1962
- Teinostoma clavium Pilsbry y Mcginty, 1945
- Teinostoma lerema Pilsbry y Mcginty, 1945
- Teinostoma megastoma (Adams, 1850)
- Teinostoma multistriata A. E. Verrill, 1884
- Teinostoma obsoletun Pilsbry y Mcginty, 1945
- Teinostoma parvicallum Pilsbry y Mcginty, 1945

==== Vitrinellidae ====
- Vitrinella multistriata (A. E. Verrill, 1884)

=== Superfamily Turbinelloidea ===
==== Costellariidae ====
- Atlantilux puella (Reeve, 1848)

==== Turbinellidae ====
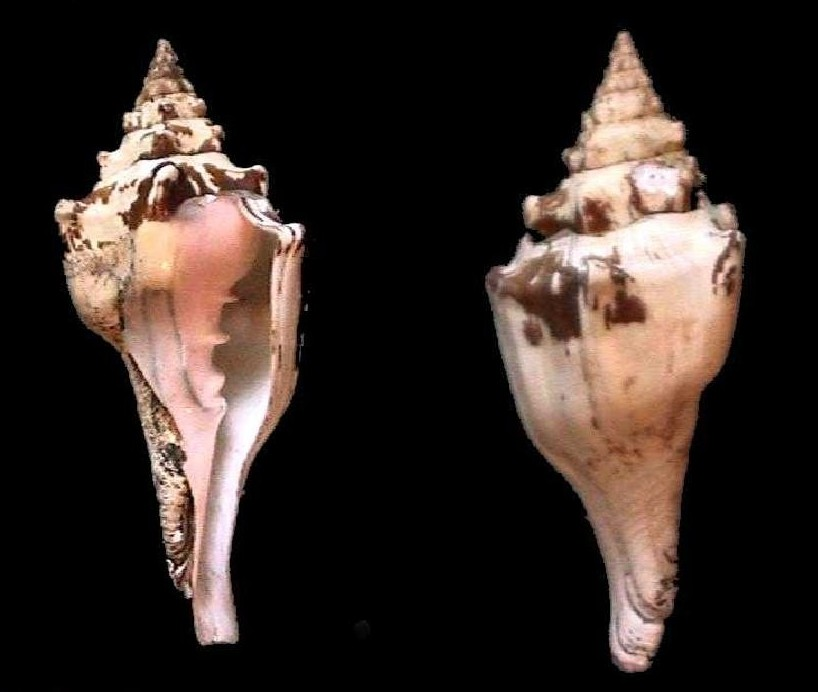
Xancus angulatus

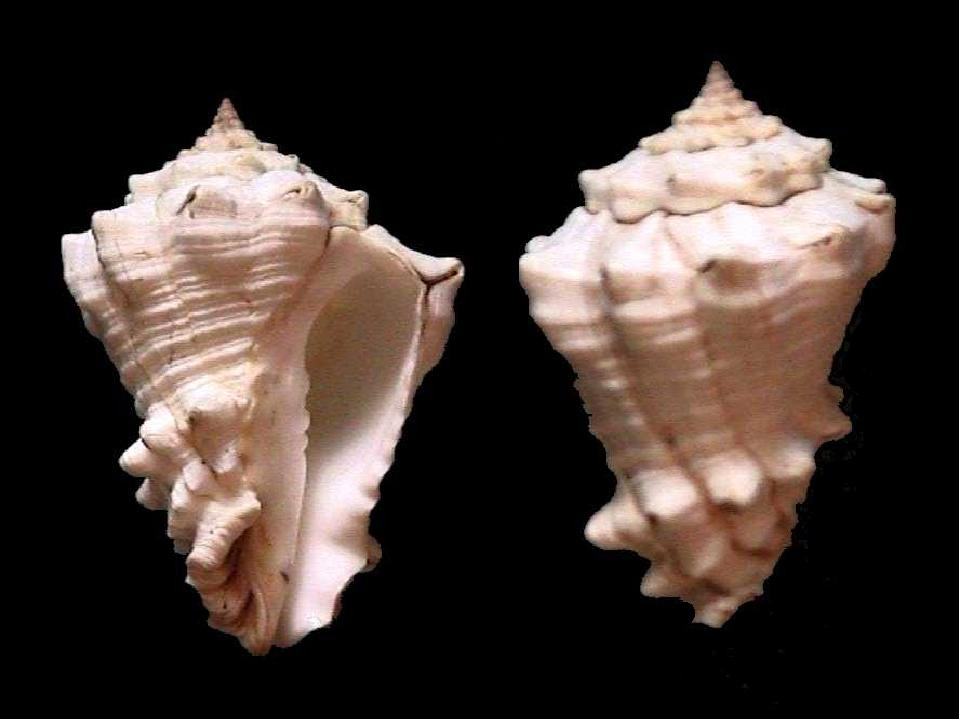
Vasun muricatum

- Turbinella angulata (Lightfoot, 1786) - West Indian chank shell
- Turbinella laevigata Anton 1838 - Brazilian chank
- Globivasum capitellum (Linnaeus, 1758) - helmet vase
- Vasum ceramicum (Linnaeus, 1758) (Introduced species) - ceramic vase
- Volutella muricata (Born, 1778) - Caribbean vase

=== Superfamily Umbraculoidea ===
==== Umbraculidae ====
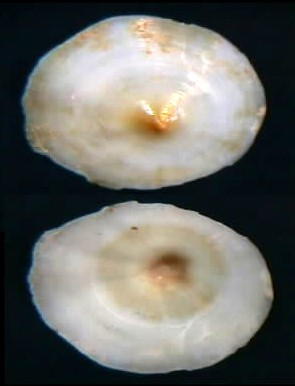
Umbraculum plicatulum

- Umbraculum plicatulum (Von Martens, 1881) (Introduced species)

=== Superfamily Vanikoroidea ===
==== Eulimidae ====
- Melanella conoidea Kurt y Stimpson, 1851
- Melanella intermedia (Cantraine, 1835)

==== Hipponicidae - hoof snails ====
- Hipponix antiquatus (Linnaeus, 1767)
- Hipponix incurvus (Gmelin, 1791)
- Hipponix subrufus Lamarck, 1819

=== Superfamily Vermetoidea ===
==== Vermetidae - worm snails ====
- Petaloconchus erectus (Dall 1888)
- Petaloconchus mcgintyi Olssony Harbison 1953
- Petaloconchus nigricans (Dall, 1984)
- Petaloconchus varians (Orbigny, 1841)
- Thylacodes decussatus (Gmelin, 1791)
- Spiruglifus irregularis (Orbigny, 1841)

=== Superfamily Volutoidea ===
==== Cancellariidae - nutmeg snails ====
- Cancellaria reticulata (Linnaeus, 1767) - common nutmeg
- Olsonella smithii (Dall, 1889)

==== Marginellidae ====
- Gibberulina agger (Watson, 1886)
- Gibberulina ovuliformis (Orbigny, 1842)
- Hyalina albolineata (Orbigny, 1842)
- Hyalina avena (Kiener, 1834)
- Hyalina gracilis (C.B.Adams, 1851)
- Hyalina laenilata (Mörch, 1860)
- Hyalina palida (Linnaeus, 1758)
- Hyalina taeniota (Sowerby, 1846)
- Marginella apacina Menke, 1828
- Marginella aureocinta Searns, 1872
- Marginella carnea (Storer, 1837)
- Marginella catenata (Montagu, 1803)
- Marginella cloveri (Rios & Matthws, 1972)
- Marginella ebruneola Conrad, 1834
- Marginella hematita (Kiener, 1834)
- Marginella lasallei
- Marginella lavalleana Orbigny, 1842
- Marginella prunum (Gmelin, 1791)
- Marginella circumvitata Weisbord, 1962
- Marginella marginata Born, 1778
- Marginellopsis serai Bavay, 1911
- Persicula interruptolineata (Muhlfeld, 1816)
- Persicula obesa (Redfield, 1848)
- Persicula muralis (Hinds, 1844)
- Persicula porcellana (Gmelin, 1791)
- Persicula pulcherrima (Gaskoim, 1849)
- Prunun rooselvelti (Bartsch & Rehder, 1939)
- Volvarina abbreviata (Kiener, 1841)

==== Volutidae ====
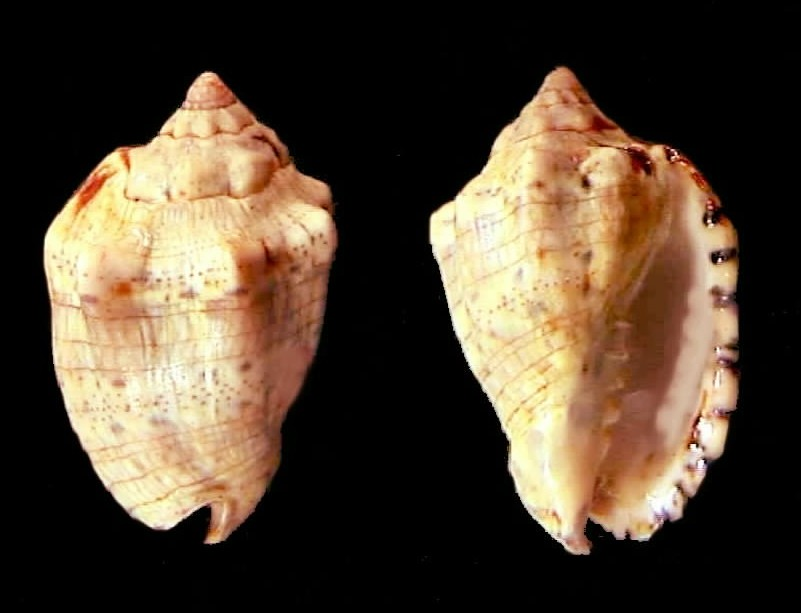
Voluta musica

- Voluta musica Linnaeus, 1758 - music volute

=== Superfamily Xenophoroidea ===
==== Xenophoridae ====
- Tugurium longleyi (Bartsch, 1931)
- Xenophora conchyliophora (Born, 1780)

== Class Bivalvia ==
=== Superfamily Anomioidea ===
==== Anomiidae ====
- Anomia simplex Orbigny, 1842 - common jingle shell
- Anomia ephippium Linnaeus, 1758
- Pododesmus rudis (Broderip, 1834) - false jingle shell

==== Placunidae ====
- Placuna placenta Linnaeus, 1758 (Introduced species) - windowpane oyster

=== Superfamily Arcoidea ===
==== Arcidae - ark clams ====
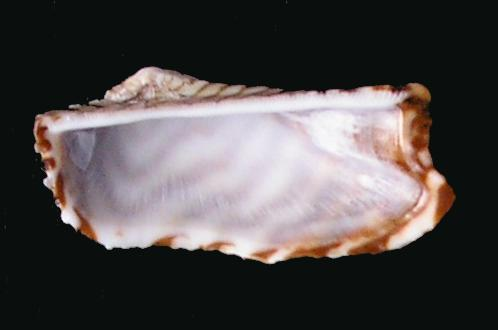
Arca zebra

- Barbatia domingensis (Lamarck, 1819) - white miniature ark clam
- Anadara brasiliana (Lamarck, 1819) - incongruous ark clam
- Anadara notabilis (Röding, 1798) - eared ark clam
- Lunarca ovalis (Bruguière, 1789) - blood arl clam
- Anadara transversa (Say, 1822) - transverse ark clam
- Arca imbricata Bruguière, 1789 - mossy ark clam
- Arca pacifica (Sowerby I, 1833) (Introduced species)
- Arca zebra (Swainson, 1833) - turkey wing ark clam
- Arcopsis adamsi (Dall, 1886)
- Barbatia cancellaria (Lamarck, 1819) - red-brown ark clam
- Barbatia candida (Helbling, 1779) - white-beard ark clam
- Barbatia tenera (Adams, 1845) - delicate ark clam
- Noetia bisulcata (Lamarck, 1819)
- Noetia ponderosa (Say, 1822) - ponderous ark clam
- Scapharca axelelssoni Macsotay & Campos, 2001
- Scapharca baughmani Hertlein, 1951
- Scapharca chemnitzii (Philippi, 1851)
- Scapharca crassissima Macsotay & Campos, 2001
- Scapharca lienosa (Say, 1863)
  - Scapharca lienosa floridana (Conrad, 1869)

Cardiidae

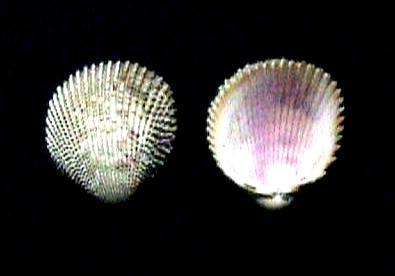
Trachycardium muricatum

- Americardia guppyi Thiele, 1910
- Americardia media (Linnaeus, 1758) - Atlantic strawberry cookie
- Crassinella martinicensis (Orbigny, 1842)
- Laevicardium laevigatum (Linnaeus, 1758)
- Laevicardium sybariticum Dall 1886
- Microcardium tinctum (Dall, 1881)
- Papyridea hiatus (Mauschen, 1787)
- Papyridea soleniformis (Bruguière, 1789
- Trachycardium isocardia (Linnaeus, 1758)
- Trachycardium egmontianum (Shuttleworth, 1856)
- Trachycardium muricatum (Linnaeus, 1758)
- Trigonocardia antillarum (Orbigny, 1842)
- Trigonocardia media (Linnaeus, 1758)

Carditidae

- Carditamera floridana (Linnaeus, 1767)
- Carditamera gracilis (Shuttleworth, 1856)

Chamidae

- Arcinella arcinella (Unneo, 1767)
- Arcinella cornuta Conrad, 1866
- Chama congregata Conrad, 1833
- Chama florida Lamarck, 1819
- Chama lactuca Dall, 1886
- Chama macerophylla (Gmelin, 1791)
- Chama sarda Reeve, 1847
- Cyclocardia armilla (Dall, 1903)
- Glyptoactis wendellwoodringi (Weisbord, 1964)
- Pseudochama radians (Lamarck, 1819)

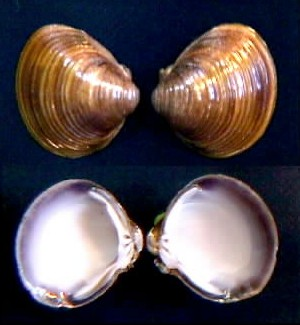
Corbicula fluminalis

Condylocardiidae

- Carditopsis guppy Maury

Corbiculidae

- Corbicula fluminalis (Múller, 1774) (Introduced species)

Corbulidae

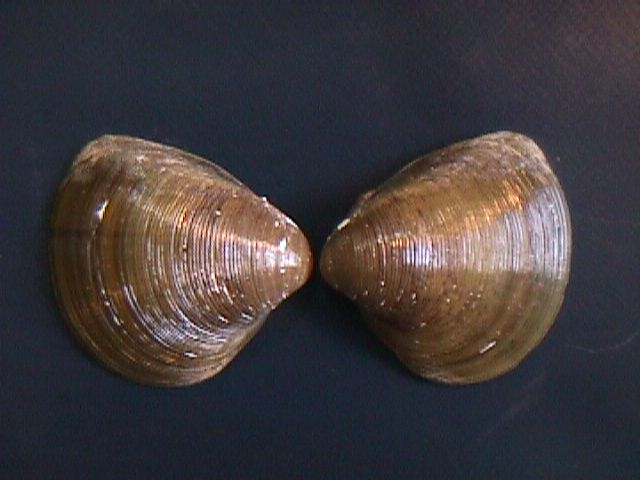
Polymesoda arctacta

- Corbula aequivalvis Philippi, 1836
- Corbula caribaea Orbigny, 1842
  - Corbula caribaea lavalleana Orbigny, 1842
- Corbula contracta Say, 1822
- Corbula dietziana Adams, 1852
- Corbula disparilis Orbigny, 1845
- Corbula lasalleana Orbigny, 1842
- Polymesoda arctacta (Philippi, 1846)

Crassatellidae

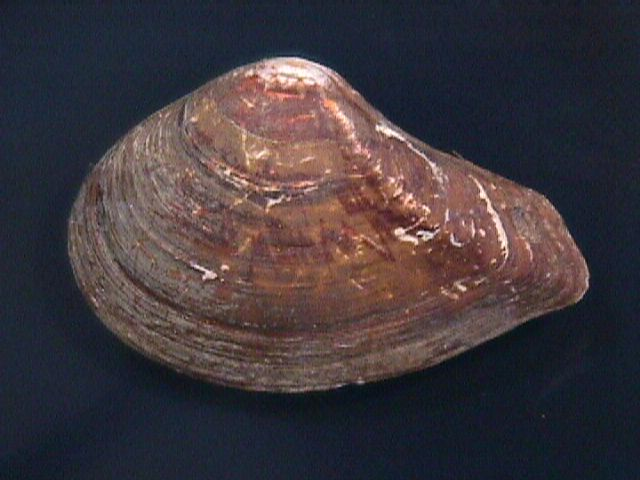
Eucrassatella speciosa

- Crasinella martinicensis Orbigny, 1842
- Eucrassatella antillarum (Reeve, 1842)
  - Eucrassatella antillarum montserratensis (Maury, 1925)
- Eucrassatella speciosa (Adams, 1852)

Cuspidariidae

- Cardiomya glypta Bush 1896
- Cardiomya perrostrata Dall, 1881

Cyrenoididae

- Cyrenoide floridana (Dall, 1889)

Donacidae

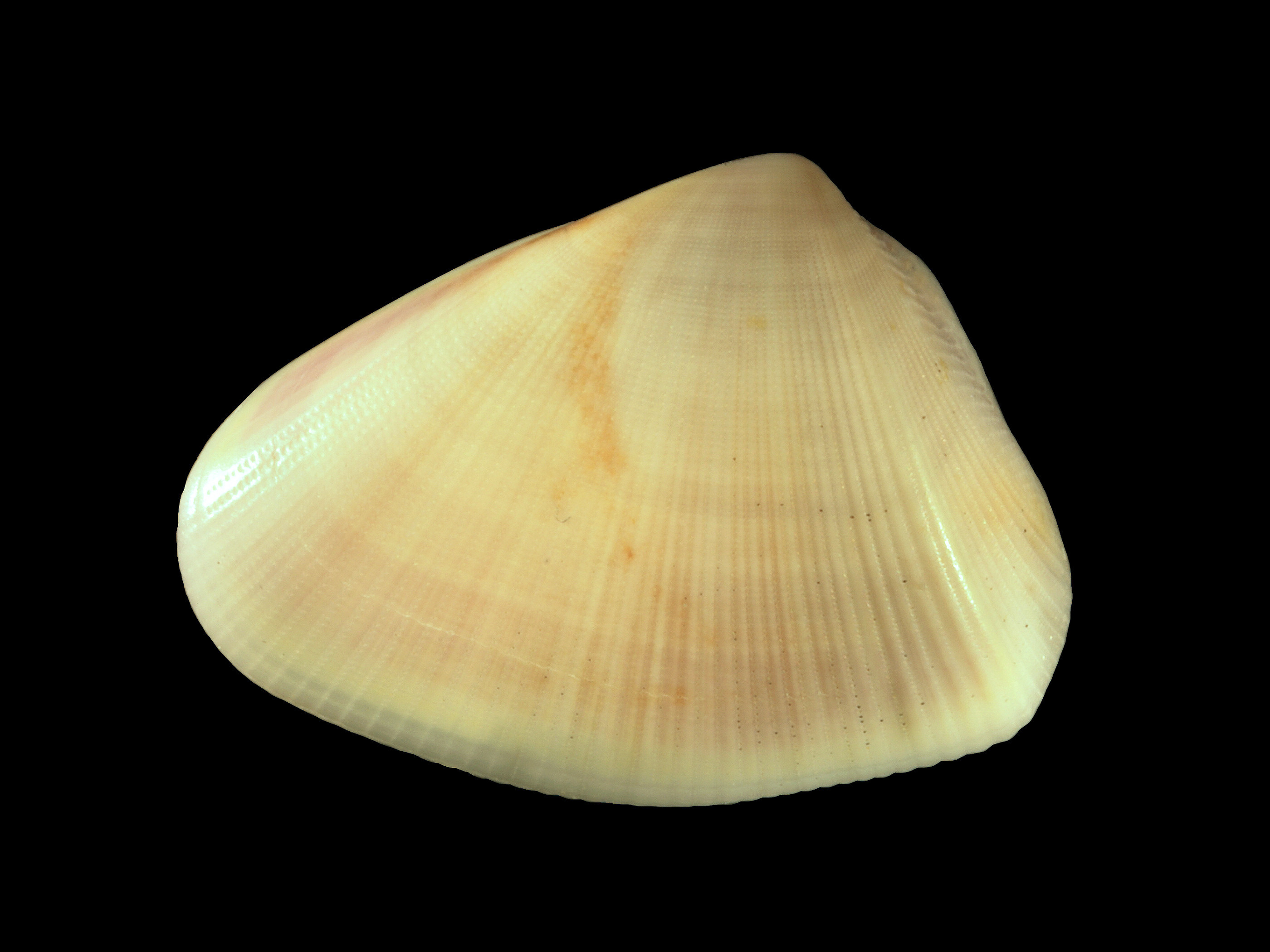
Donax denticulatus

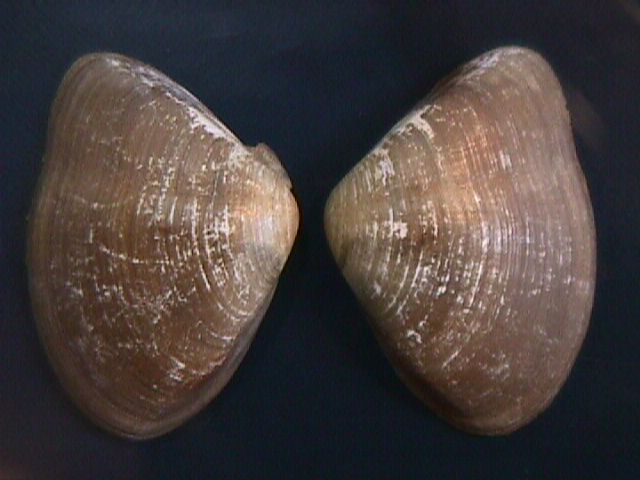
Iphigenia brasiliensis

- Donax clathratus (Reeve, 1854) (Introduced species)
- Donax denticulatus Linnaeus, 1758
- Donax striatus Linnaeus, 1767
- Donax higuerotensis
- Donax variabilis texasianus Philippi, 1847
- Iphigenia brasiliana (Lamarck, 1818)

Dreissenidae

- Congreria lioeblichi Shütt, 1991
- Mytilopsis dominguensis Récluz, 1852
- Mytilopsis sallei Récluz, 1849

Glycymeridae

- Glycymeris castaneus Lamarck,
- Glycymeris decussata (Linnaeus, 1758) - decussate bittersweet
- Glycymeris maculata (Broderip, 1832)
- Glycymeris tesellata (Sowerby, 1833)
- Glycymeris undata (Linnaeus, 1758) - Atlantic bittersweet
- Tucetona pectinata (Gmelin, 1791) - comb bittersweet

Isognomonidae

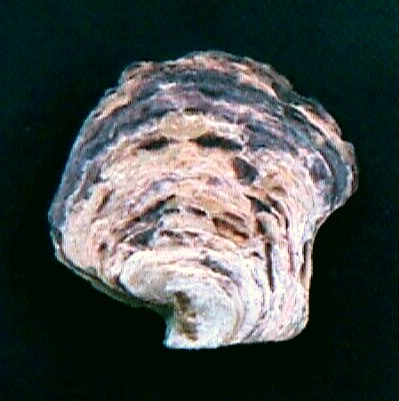
Isognomon alatus

- Isognomon alatus (Gmelin, 1791) - flat tree oyster
- Isognomon bicolor (Adams, 1845)
- Isognomon oblicua (Lamarck, 1818)
- Isognomon radiatus (Anton, 1839) - Lister's tree oyster
- Isognomon vulsella (Lamarck, 1818)
- Isognomon vulselloides Macsotay & Campos, 2001

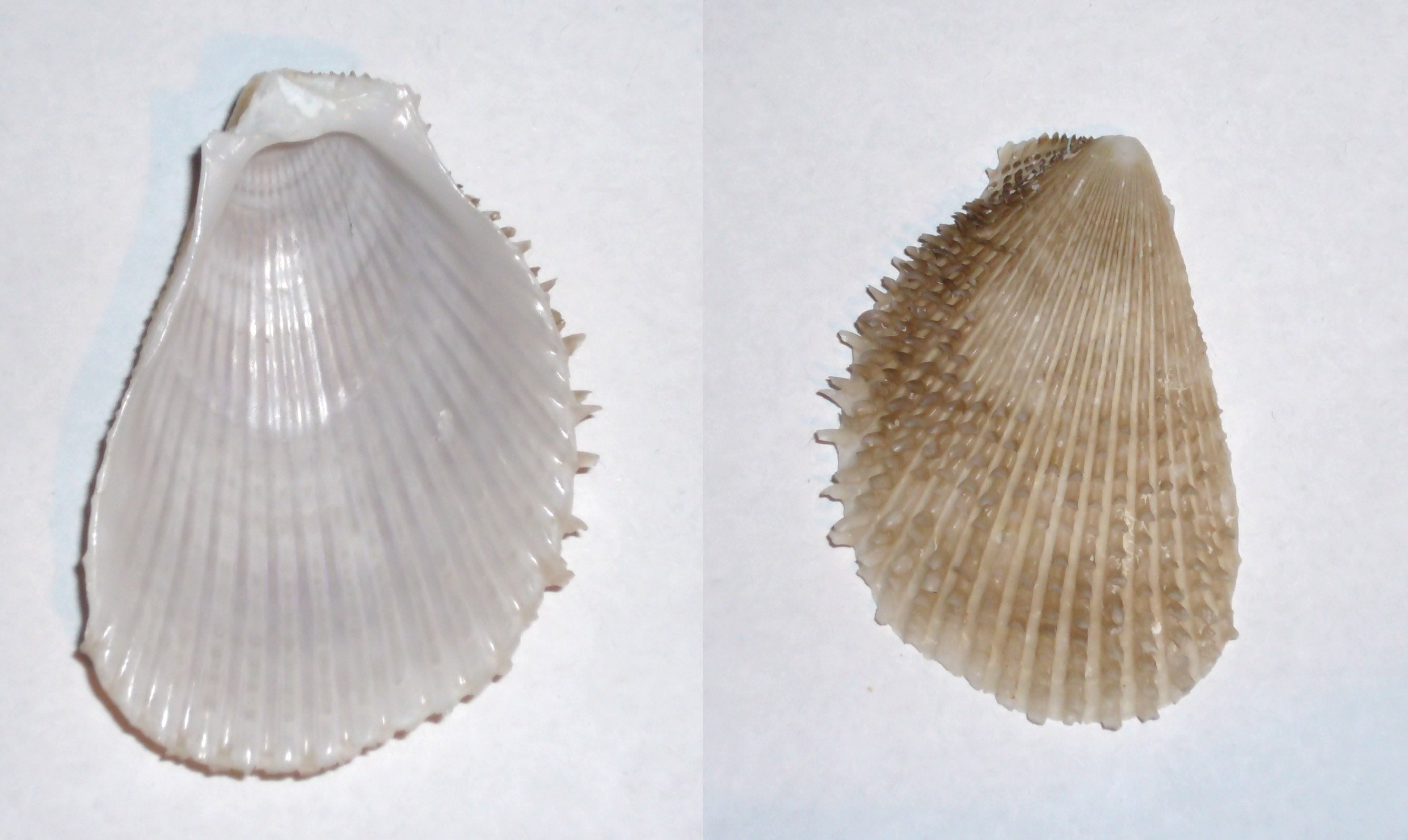
Lima lima

Lasaeidae

- Lasaea magallanica Carceles

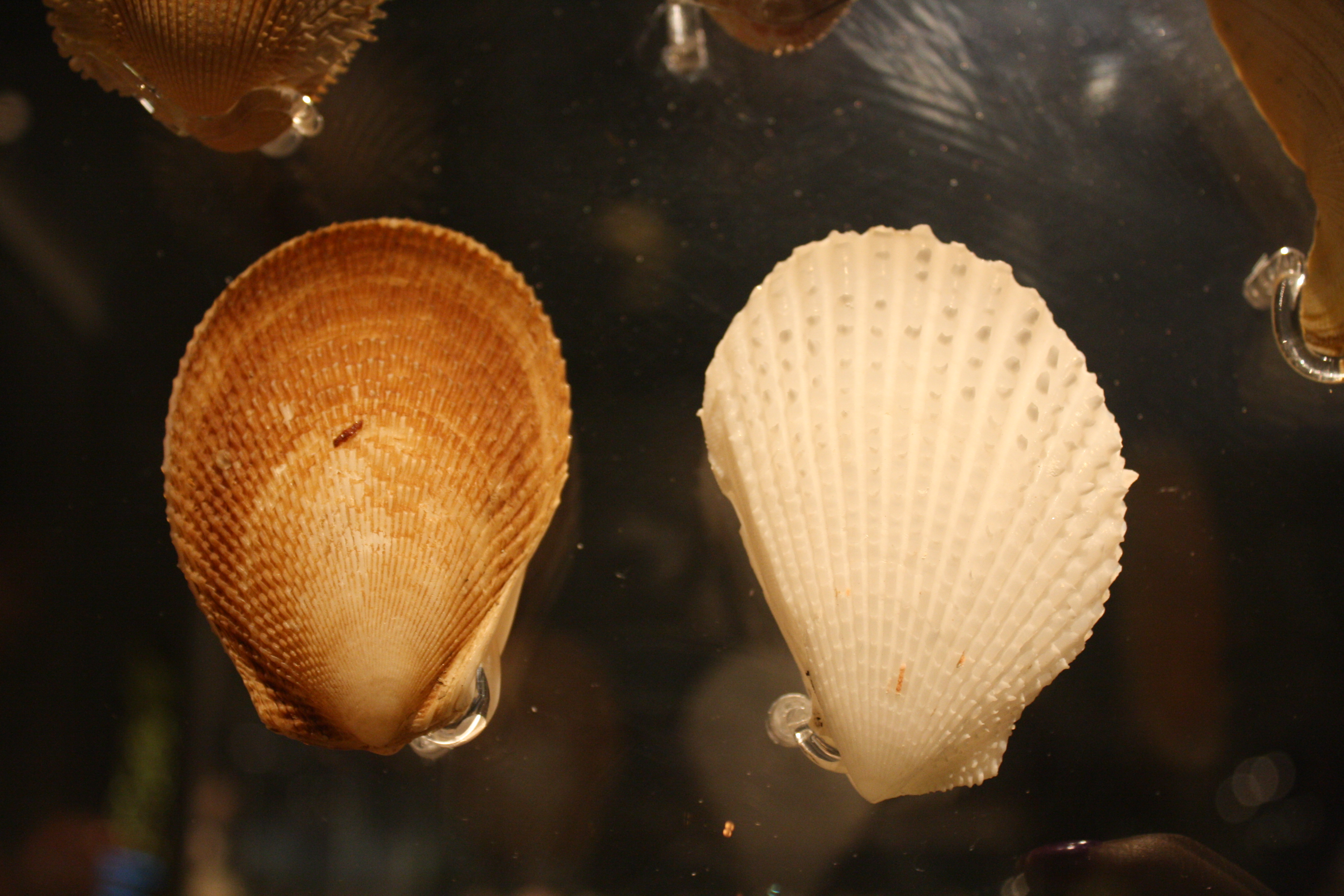
Lima scabra

Limidae

- Acesta bullisi (H.E. Vokes, 1963)
- Lima lima (Linnaeus, 1758) - spiny fileclam
- Lima pellucida Adams, 1846 - Antillean fileclam
- Ctenoides scaber (Born, 1778) - flame scallop
  - Ctenoides scaber scaber (Sowerby, 1843)
- Limatula setifera Dall, 1886

Lucinidae

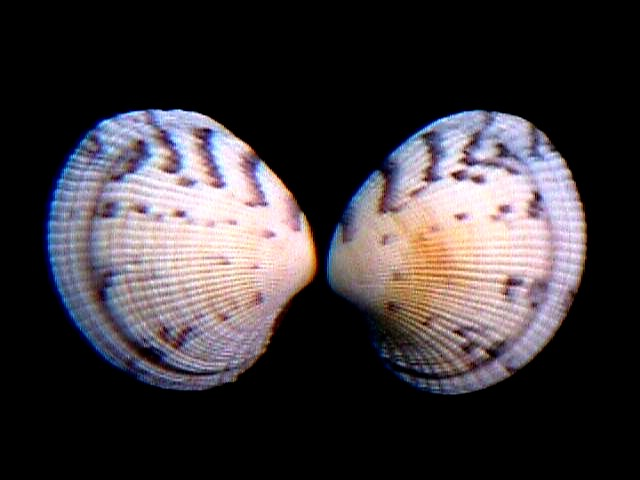
Codakia orbicularis

- Anodontia alba Link, 1807 - buttercup lucine
- Clathrolucina costata (Orbigny, 1842) - costate lucine
- Codakia orbicularis (Linnaeus, 1758) - tiger lucine
- Ctena orbiculata (Montagu, 1808) - dwarf tiger lucine
- Divaricella quadrisulcata (Orbigny, 1842) - cross-hatched lucine
- Lucina ephreimi Weisbord, 1964
- Lucina katherinepalmerae Weisbord, 1964
- Lucina muricata (Spengler, 1798)
- Lucina nassula (Conrad, 1846)
- Lucina pectinata (Gmelin, 1791)
- Lucina pensylvanica (Linnaeus, 1758)* - Pennsylvania lucine
- Lucina radians (Conrad, 1841)
- Lucina trisulcata (Dall & Simpson, 1901)
- Parvilucina blanda (Dall & Simpson, 1901
- Parvilucina multilineata (Tuomey & Holmes, 1857)

Lyonsiidae

- Entodesma weisbprdi Macsotay & Campos, 2001
- Lyonsia beana Orbigny, 1842
- Lyonsia hyalina floridana Conrad, 1849

Mactridae

- Anatina anatina (Spengler, 1802) - smooth duckclam
- Mactra fragilis Gmelin, 1791
- Mactrellona alata (Spengler, 1802)
- Mactronella exoleta (Gray, 1837) (Introduced species)
- Mactrellona iheringi (Dall, 1897)
- Mulinia cleryana (Orbigny, 1846)
- Raeta plicatella (Lamarck, 1818)
- Rangia flexuosa (Conrad, 1839)
- Rangia mendica (Gold, 1851) (Introduced species)

Malleidae

- Malleus candeanus (Orbigny, 1842)

Mesodesmatidae

- Ervilia concentrica (Holmes 1860)
- Ervilia nitens (Montagu, 1806)
  - Ervilia nitens venezuelana Weisbord, 1964

Myidae

- Sphenia antillensis Dall & Simpson, 1901

Mytilidae

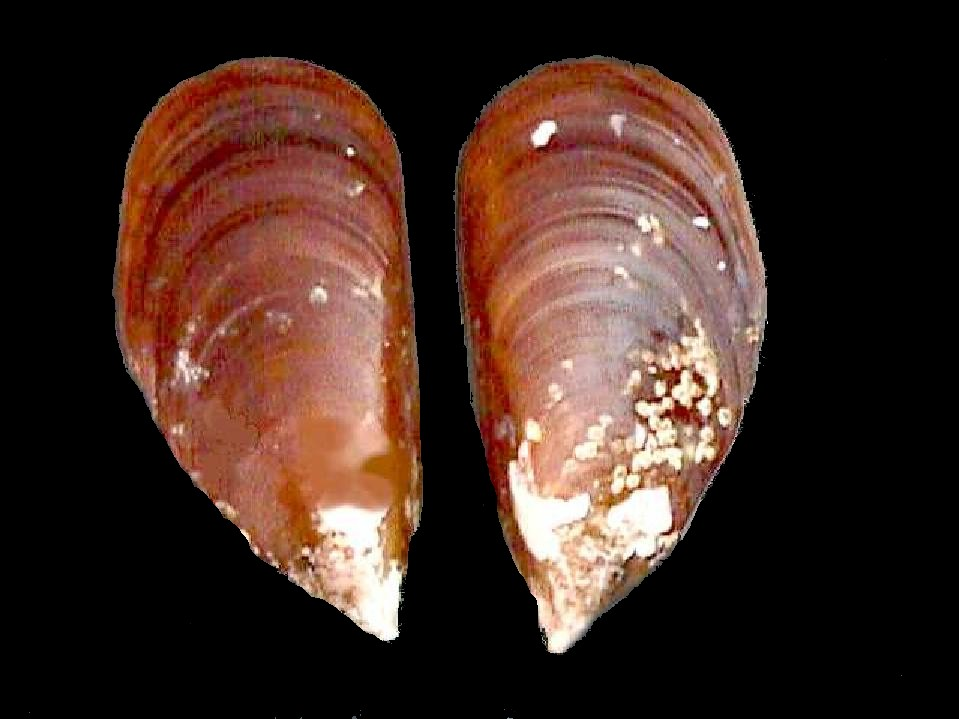
Perna perna

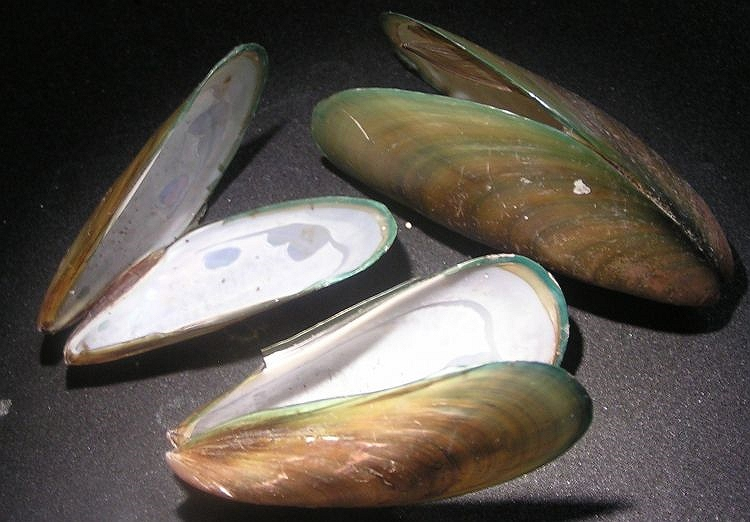
Perna viridis

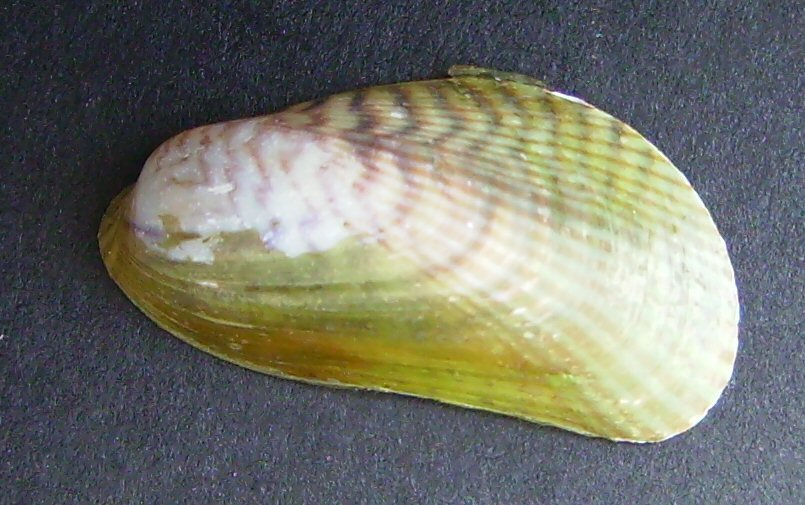
Musculista senhousia

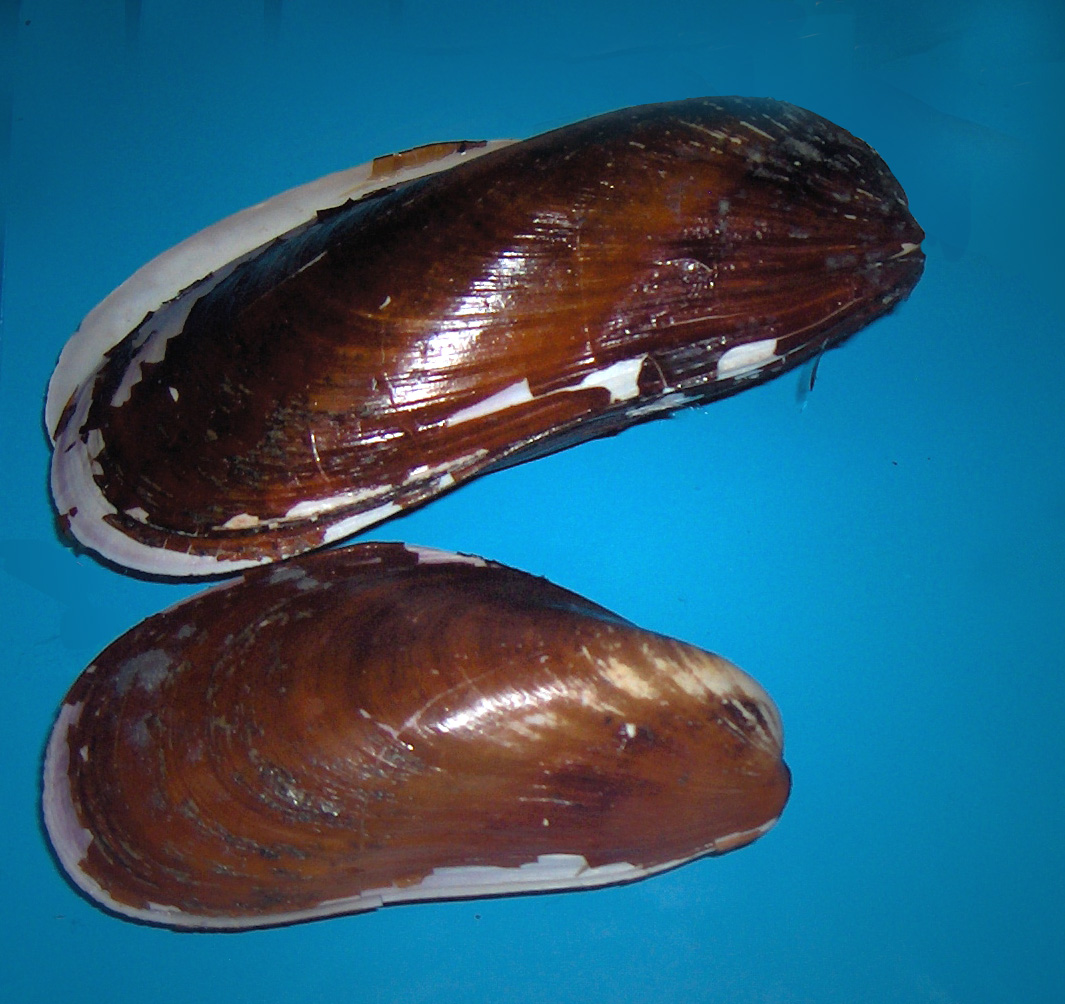
Modiolus modiolus

- Arcuatula papyria (Conrad, 1846) - Atlantic paper mussel
- Arcuatula senhousia (Benson, 1842) (Introduced species) - Asian date mussel
- Botula fusca (Gmelin, 1791) - cinnamon mussel
- Brachidontes modiolus (Linnaeus, 1767) - yellow mussel
- Brachidontes exustus (Linnaeus, 1758) - scorched mussel
- Brachidontes dominguensis (Lamarck, 1819)
- Crenella abbotti Altena, 1968
- Crenella decusata (Montagu, 1808)
- Crenella divaricata (Orbigny, 1842)
- Gregariella coralliophaga (Gmelin, 1791) (Introduced species) - artist's mussel
- Ischadium recurvum (Rafinesque, 1820) - hooked mussel
- Lithophaga aristata (Dilwyn, 1817) - scissor date mussel
- Lithophaga bisulcata (Orbigny, 1842) - mahogany date mussel
- Lithophaga nigra (Orbigny, 1842) - black date mussel
- Modiolus americanus (Leach, 1815) - tulip mussel
- Modiolus ficoides Macsotay & Campos, 2001
- Modiolus squamosus Beauperthuy, 1967
- Musculus lateralis (Say, 1822) - lateral mussel
- Mytella maracaibensis Beaperthuy 1967
- Perna perna (Linnaeus, 1758) (Introduced species) - brown mussel
- Perna viridis (Linnaeus, 1767) (Introduced species) - Asian green mussel
- Ryenella lateralis (Say, 1821)

Nuculanidae

- Adrana gloriosa Adams
- Adrana tellinoides (Sowerby, 1823)
- Nuculana acuta (Conrad, 1831) - pointed nut clam
- Nuculana carpenteri (Dall, 1881)
- Nuculana cestrota (Dall, 1890)
- Nuculana concentrica (Say, 1824) - concentric nut clam
- Nuculana dalmasi Dautzenberg & Fischer 1897
- Saccella jamaisensis (Orbigny, 1845)

Nuculidae

- Nucula crenulata Adams, 1835
- Nucula dalmasi Dautzenberg, 1900
- Nucula mareana Weisbord, 1964.
- Nucula semiornata Orbigny, 1842

Ostreidae

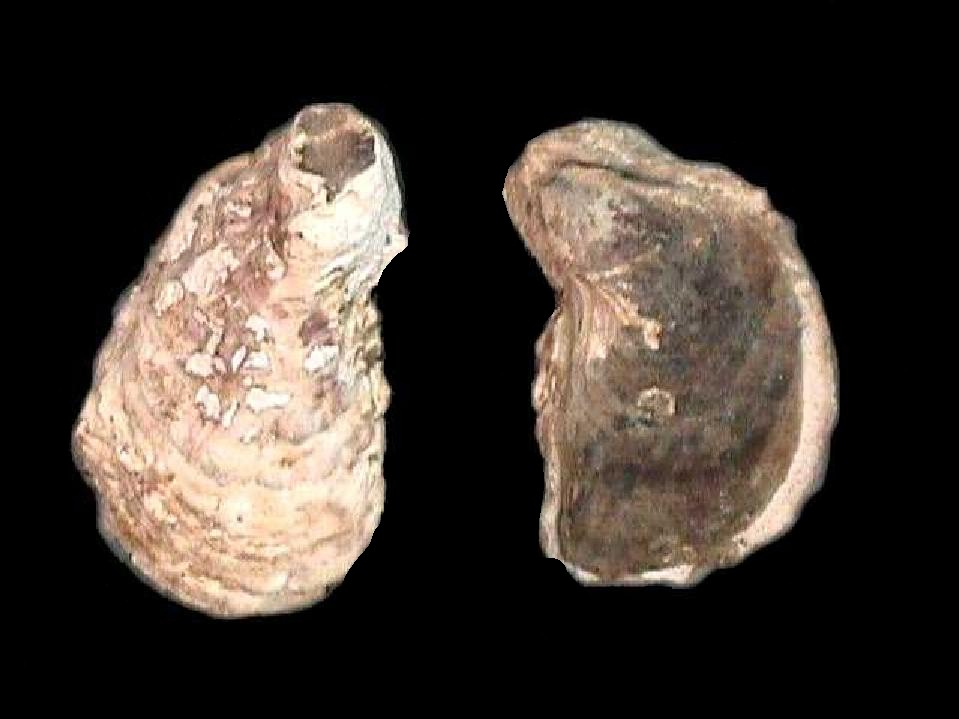
Crassostrea rhizophorae

- Crassostrea rhizophorae (Guilding, 1828) - mangrove cupped oyster
- Crassostrea virginica (Gmeling, 1791) - Eastern oyster
- Ostrea caboblanquensis Weisbord, 1964
- Ostrea cristata Born, 1778
- Ostrea equestris Say, 1834 - horse oyster
- Ostrea libella Weisbord, 1964
- Ostrea lixula Weisbord, 1964
- Ostrea puelchana (Orbigny, 1841)
- Ostrea spreta (Orbigny, 1845)
- Lopha folium (Linnaeus, 1758)
- Lopha frons (Linnaeus, 1758)
- Lopha gibsonsmithi Macsotay & Campos, 2001

Pandoridae

- Pandora arenosa Conrad, 1834
- Pandora bushiniana Dall, 1886

Pectinidae

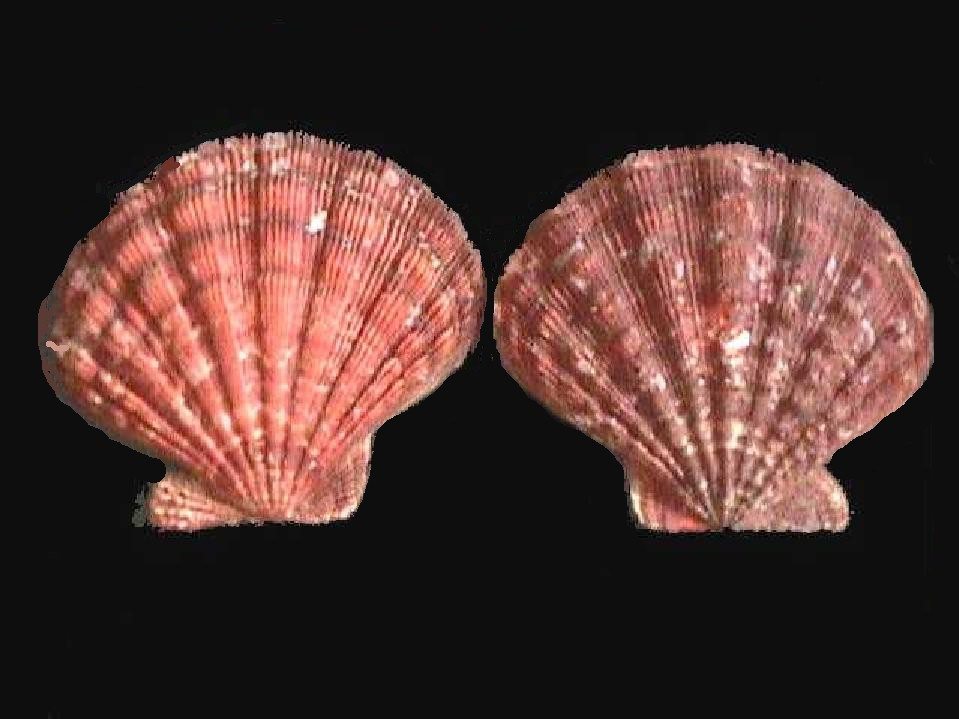
Lyropecten nodosus

- Amusium glyptus (A. E. Verrill, 1882)
- Amusium laurenti (Gmelin, 1791)
- Amusium papyraceum (Gabb, 1873)
- Aequipecten acanthodes (Dall, 1925) - thistle scallop
- Aequipecten lineolaris (Lamarck, 1819)
- Aequipecten mucosus (Wood, 1828)
- Argopecten gibbus (Linnaeus, 1758) - Atlantic calico scallop
- Argopecten imitatoides Macsotay & Campos 2001b
- Argopecten noronhensis (A.E. Smith, 1885)
- Argopecten nucleus (Born, 1778) - nucleus scallop
- Argopecten irradians amplicostatus Dall, 1898 - Atlantic bay scallop
- Chlamys benedecti A. E. Verrill & Bush,
- Chlamys imbricata (Gmelin, 1791)
- Chlamys muscosa (Wood, 1828)
- Chlamys ornata (Lamarck, 1819)
- Leptopecten bavayi (Dauzemberg, 1900)
- Lyropecten antillarum (Récluz, 1853)
- Lyropecten nodosus (Linnaeus, 1758)
- Pecten amusoides Campos, 2001
- Pecten ziczac (Linnaeus, 1758)
  - Pecten ziczac caboblanquensis (Druckerman & Weisbord, 1964)
- Semipallium antillarum (Récluz, 1853)

Periplomatidae

- Cochlodesma leanum Conrad, 1831
- Periploma compresa Orbigny, 1845
- Periploma inequale (Adams, 1842)
- Periploma margaritacea (Lamarck, 1801)

Petricolidae

- Petricola inversa Macsotay & Campos, 2001
- Petricola lapicida ((Gmelin, 1791)
- Petricola tipica (Jonas, 1844)
- Rupellaria typica (Jonas, 1844)

Pholadidae

- Barnea truncata (Say, 1822)
- Cyrtopleura costata (Linnaeus, 1758) - angel wing clam
- Martesia fragilis A. E. Verrill y Bush, 1890
- Martesia cuneiformis (Say, 1822)
- Martesia cuneiformis (Linnaeus, 1756)
- Pholas campechiensis Gmelin, 1791

Pinnidae

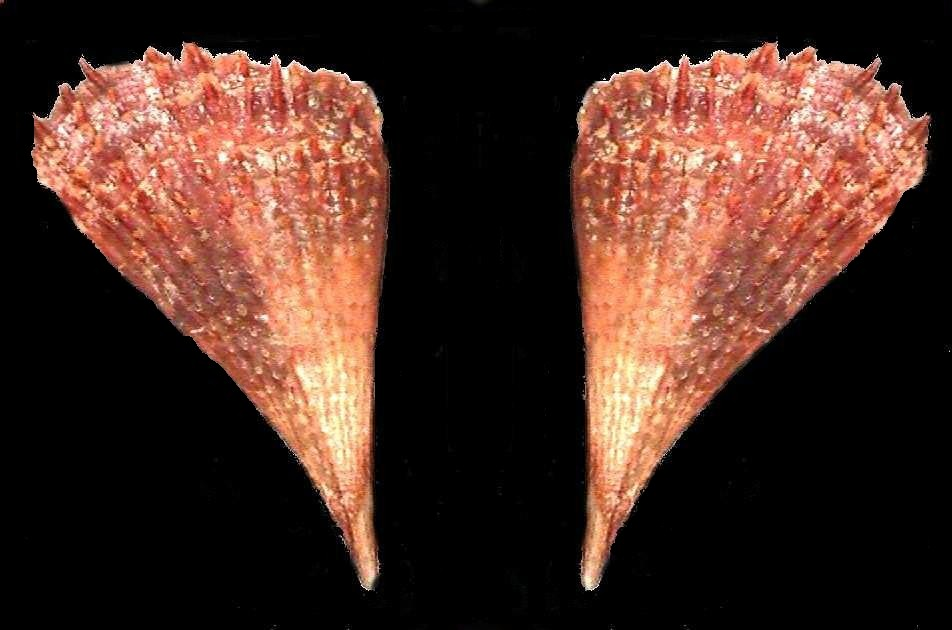
Pinna carnea

- Atrina bitteri Gibson-Smith
- Atrina rigida (Lightfoot, 1786) - rigid pen shell
- Atrina seminuda (Lamark, 1819) - half-naked pen shell
- Atrina serrata (Sowerby, 1825) - saw-toothed pen shell
- Atrina venezuelana
- Pinna carnea Gmelin, 1791 - amber pen shell
- Pinna rudis - rough pen shell

Plicatulidae

- Plicatula gibbosa Lamarck, 1801 - Atlantic kitten's paw
- Plicatula penicillata Carpenter, 1856

Pteriidae

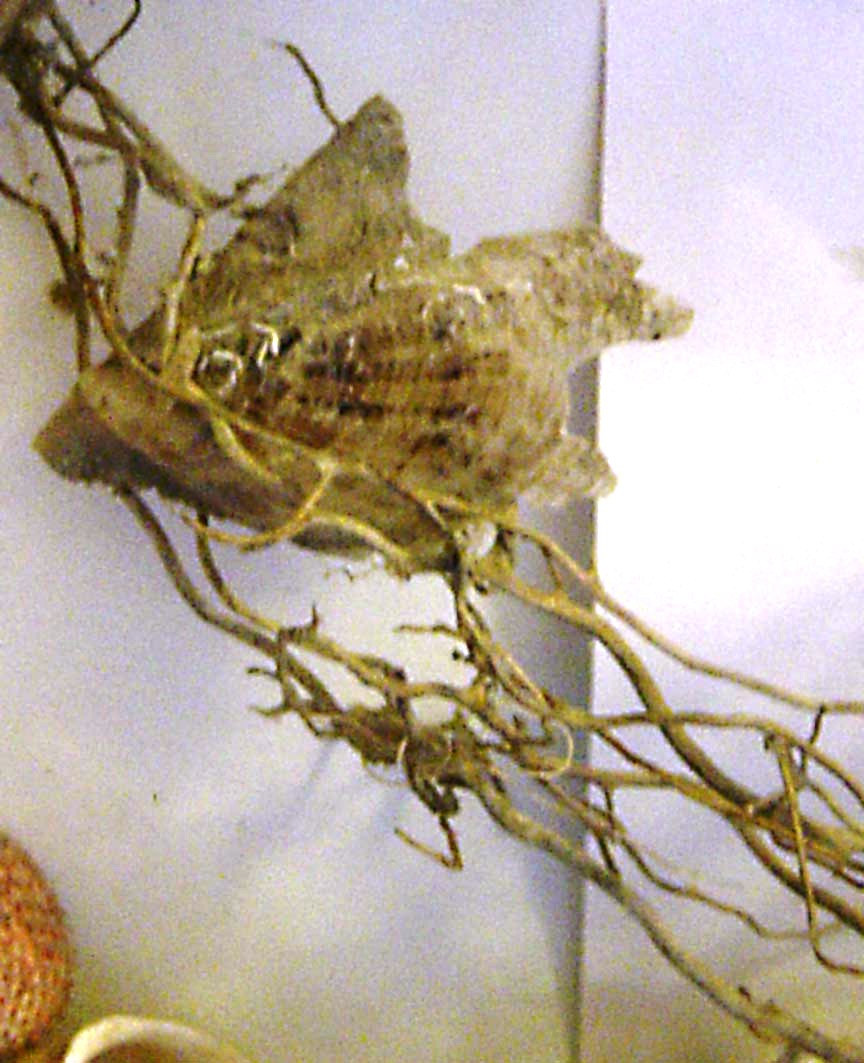
Pteria hirundo

- Pteria attilatomasi Macsotay & Campos, 2001
- Pteria colymbus (Réiding, 1798) - Atlantic winged oyster
- Pteria hirundo (Linnaeus, 1758) (Introduced species)
- Pinctada imbricata Réiding, 1798
- Pinctada radiata Leach, 1814 - Atlantic pearl-oyster

Sanguinolariidae

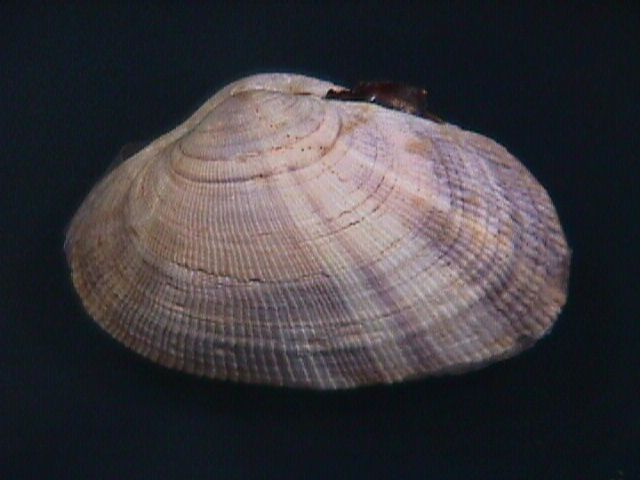
Asaphis deflorata

- Asaphis deflorata (Linnaeus, 1758) - gaudy sanguin
- Heterodonax bimaculatus (Linnaeus, 1758)
- Sanguinolaria cruenta (Lightfoot, 1786)
- Sanguinolaria sanguinolaria (Gmelin, 1791)

Semelidae

- Conungia coarctata Sowerby, 1833
- Cumingia lamellosa (Sowerby, 1833) (Introduced species)
- Semele bellastriata Conrad, 1847
  - Semele bellastriata donovani McGinty, 1555
- Semele proficua (Pulteney, 1799)
- Semele purpuracens (Gmelin, 1791)
- Semele radiata Say,

Solecurtidae

- Tagelus divisus (Spengler, 1794)
- Tagelus plebeius (Lightfoot, 1786)

Solenidae

- Solen obliquus Spengler, 1794
- Solen rosewateri Altena, 1971
- Solecurtis sanctaemarthae Orbigny, 1842

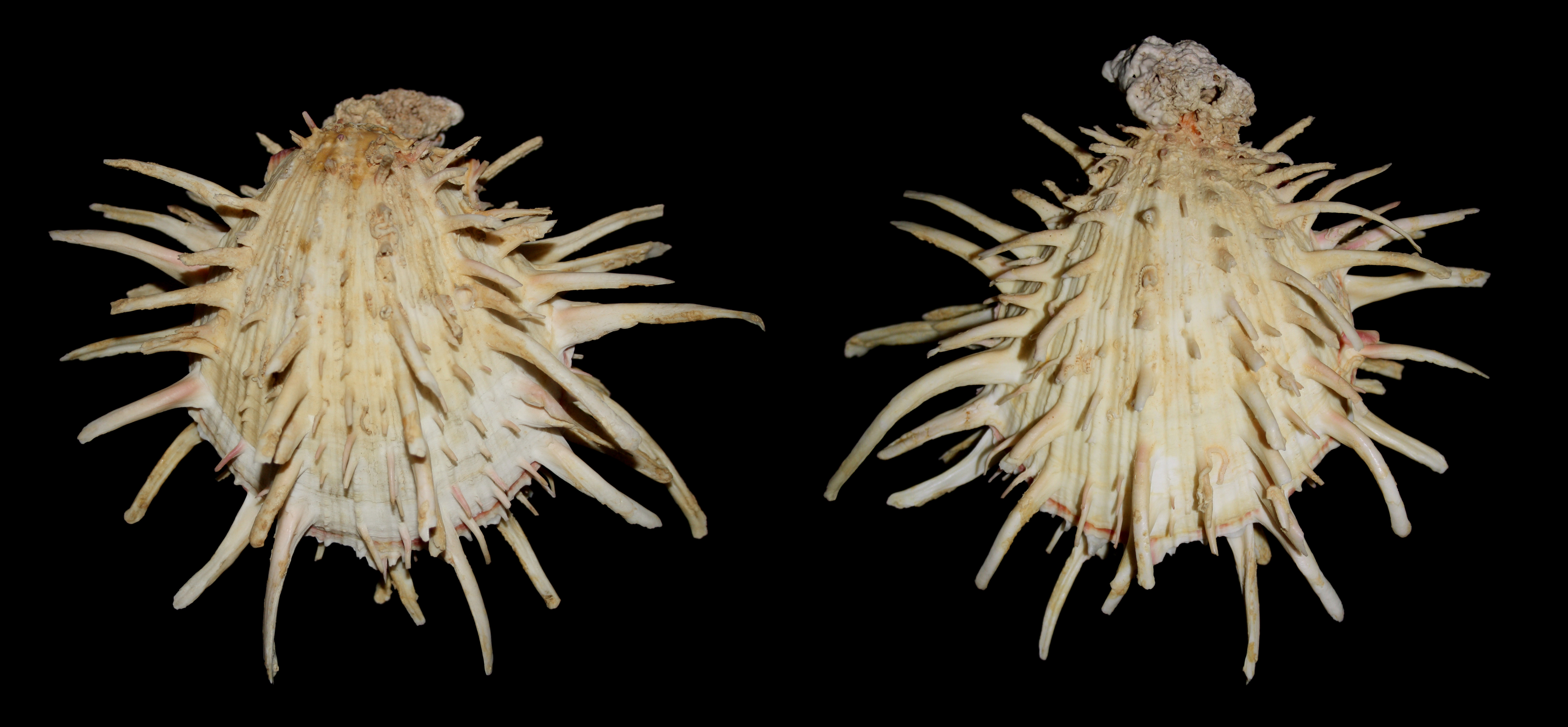
Spondylus americanus

Spondylidae

- Spondylus americanus Hermann, 1781 - Atlantic thorny oyster
- Spondylus ictericus Reeve, 1856

Sportellidae

- Basterotia elliptica (Récluz, 1850)
- Basterotia quadrata (Hinds, 1843)

Tellinidae

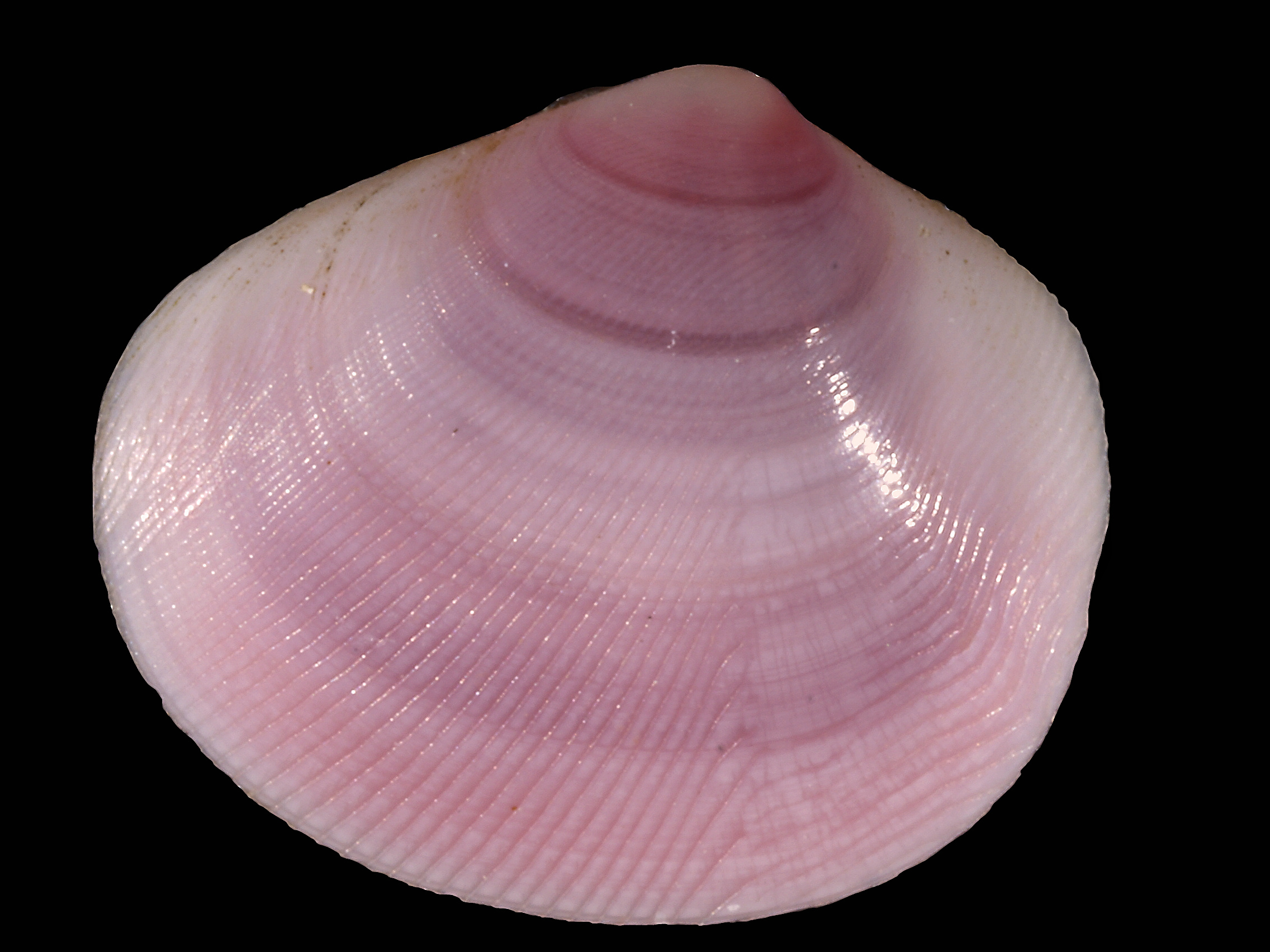
Strigilla carnaria

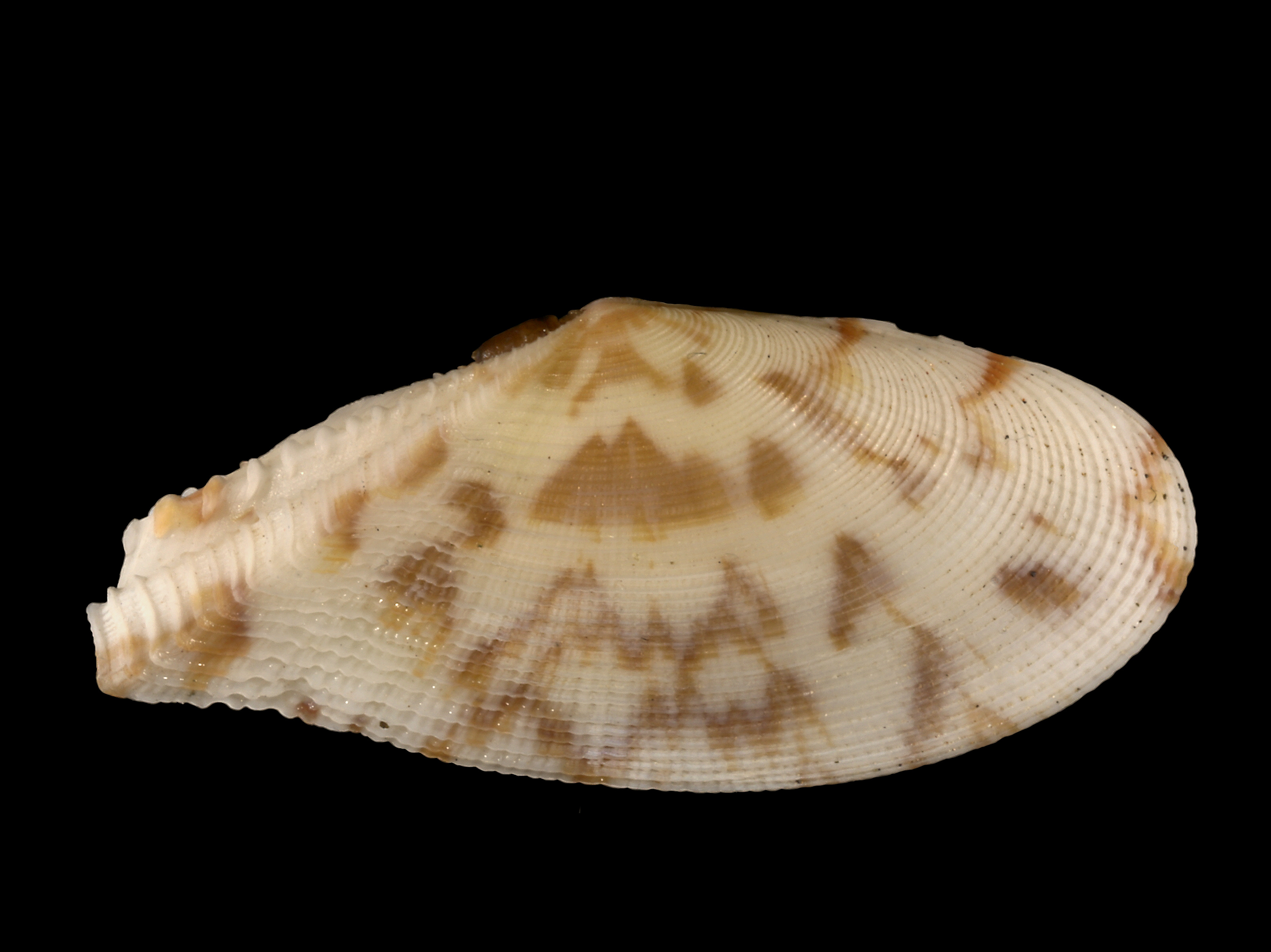
Tellina listeri

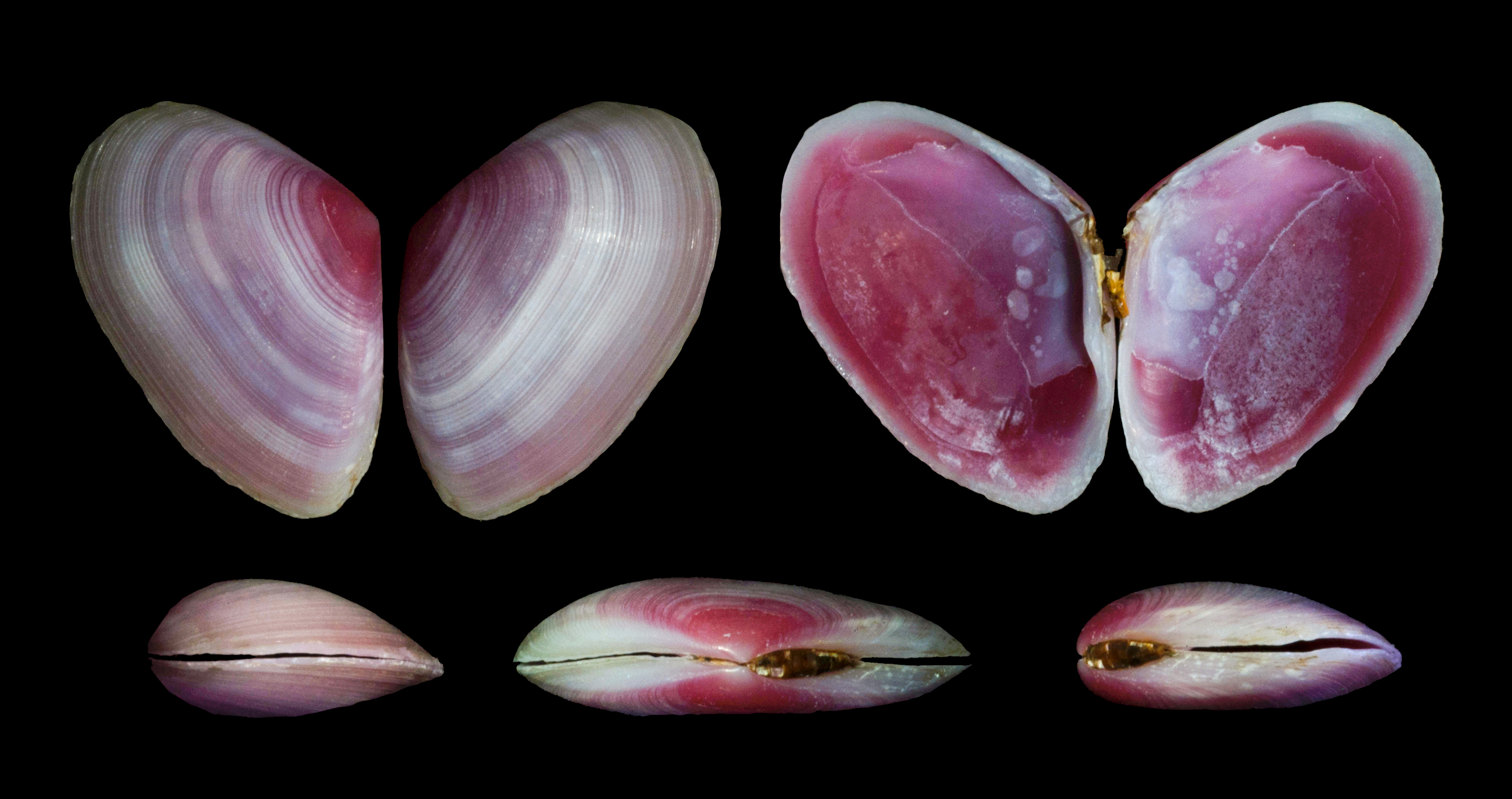
Eurytellina lineata

- Arcophagia fausta (Pulteney, 1799)
- Florimetis intastriata (Say, 1826)
- Austromacoma constricta (Bruguière, 1792)
- Macoma brasiliana Dall
- Macoma brevifrons (Say, 1834)
- Macoma cleryana (Orbigny, 1846)
- Macoma pseudomera Dall & Simpson, 1901
- Macoma tageliformis Dall, 1900
- Psammotreta brevifrons (Say, 1834)
- Psammotreta intastriata (Say, 1827)
- Strigilla carnaria (Linnaeus, 1758)
- Strigilla pisiformis (Linnaeus, 1758)
- Strigilla producta Tryon, 1870
- Strigilla pseudocarnaria Boss, 1969 (Introduced species)
- Strigilla rombergii (Mörch, 1853)
- Eurytellina punicea Born, 1778
- Tellidora cristata (Récluz, 1842)
- Tellina alternata Say, 1822
- Tellina camachoi Macsotay & Campos 2001b
- Tellina consobrina D´Orbigny
- Tellina cristalina Spengler, 1798
- Tellina exerythra Boss, 1964
- Tellina fausta Pultency, 1799
- Tellina gouldii Hanley, 1846
- Tellina juttingae Altena, 1960
- Tellina nitens Adams, 1845
- Tellina laevigata Linnaeus, 1758
- Tellina lineata Turton, 1819
- Tellina mera Say, 1834
- Tellina probina Boss, 1964
- Tellina radiata Linnaeus, 1758 - sunrise tellin
- Tellina sandix Boss, 1968
- Tellina similaris Sowerby, 1806
- Tellina sybaritica Dall, 1881
- Tellina tirata Turton, 1819
- Tellinella listeri Röding, 1798 - speckled tellin

Teredinidae

- Lyodus pedicellatus (Quaterfages, 1849) (Introduced species)
- Bankia carinata (Gray, 1827 (Introduced species)
- Bankia fimbriatulla Moll & Roch, 1931
- Bankia martensi Stempel 1899 (Introduced species)
- Neoteredo
- Teredo

Thraciidae

- Cyathodonta magnifica Jonas, 1850
- Cyathodonta semirugosa (Reeve, 1859)
- Thracia distorta (Montagu, 1808) (Introduced species)

Trapeziidae

- Coralliophaga coralliophaga (Gmelin, 1791)

Ungulinidae

- Diplodonta candeana (Orbigny, 1842)
- Diplodonta notata (Dall & Simpson, 1901)
- Diplodonta punctata (Say, 1822)
- Diplodonta semiaspera (Philippi, 1836)

Veneridae

- Anomalocardia flexuosa (Gmelin, 1791)
- Anomalocardia cuneimeris Conrad, 1846
- Callista eusymata (Dall, 1890)
- Chione cancellata (Linnaeus, 1767) - Caribbean cross-barred venus
- Chione constricta Macsotay 1968
- Chione cultellata Weisbord, 1964
- Chione granulata (Conrad, 1841)
- Chione intapurpurea (Conrad, 1849)
- Chione mamoense Weisbord, 1964
- Chione paphia (Linnaeus, 1767)
- Chione pubera (Bory-Saint-Vicent, 1827)
- Chione riomaturensis Maury, 1925
- Chione subrostrata (Lamarck, 1818)
- Cincomphalus strigillinus (Dall, 1902) (Introduced species)
- Clausinella gayi (Hupé, 1854) (Introduced species)
- Clausinella fasciata (Da Costa, 1778) (Introduced species)
- Cyclinella tenuis (Récluz, 1852)
- Dosinia concentrica (Born, 1778) - West indian dosina
- Dosinia elegans Conrad, 1846 - elegant dosinia
- Gemma gemma (Totten, 1934)
- Gouldia venezuelana Weisbord, 1964
- Lirophora latilirata (Conrad, 1841) - imperial venus clam
- Macrocallista maculata (Linnaeus, 1758)
- Periglypta listeri (Gray, 1838)
- Pitar albidus (Gmelin, 1791)
- Pitar arestus (Dall y Simpson, 1901)
- Pitar bermudez Macsotay & campos, 2001
- Pitar circinatus (Born, 1778)
- Pitar dione (Linnaeus, 1758)
- Pitar fulminatus (Menke, 1828)
- Protothaca granulata (Gmelin, 1791)
- Protothaca pectorina (Lamarck, 1818)
- Tivela mactroides (Born, 1778)
- Transenella caboblanquensis Weisbord, 1964
- Transenella conradiata Dall, 1902
- Transenella culebrana (Dall & Simpson, 1901)
- Transenella stimpsoni Dall, 1902
- Ventricolaria listeroides (Linnaeus, 1758)
- Ventricolaria rigida (Dillwyn, 1817)
- Ventricolaria rugatina (Helprinn, 1887)

Verticordiidae

- Verticordia ornata

== Class Cephalopoda ==
Argonautidae

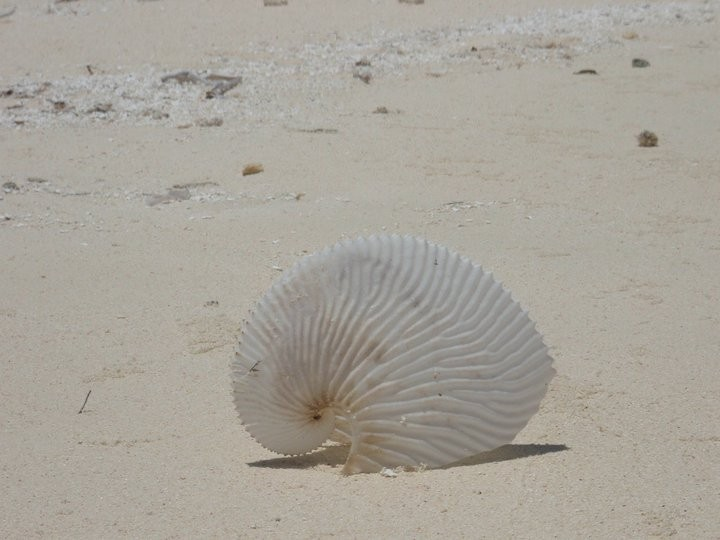
Argonauta argo

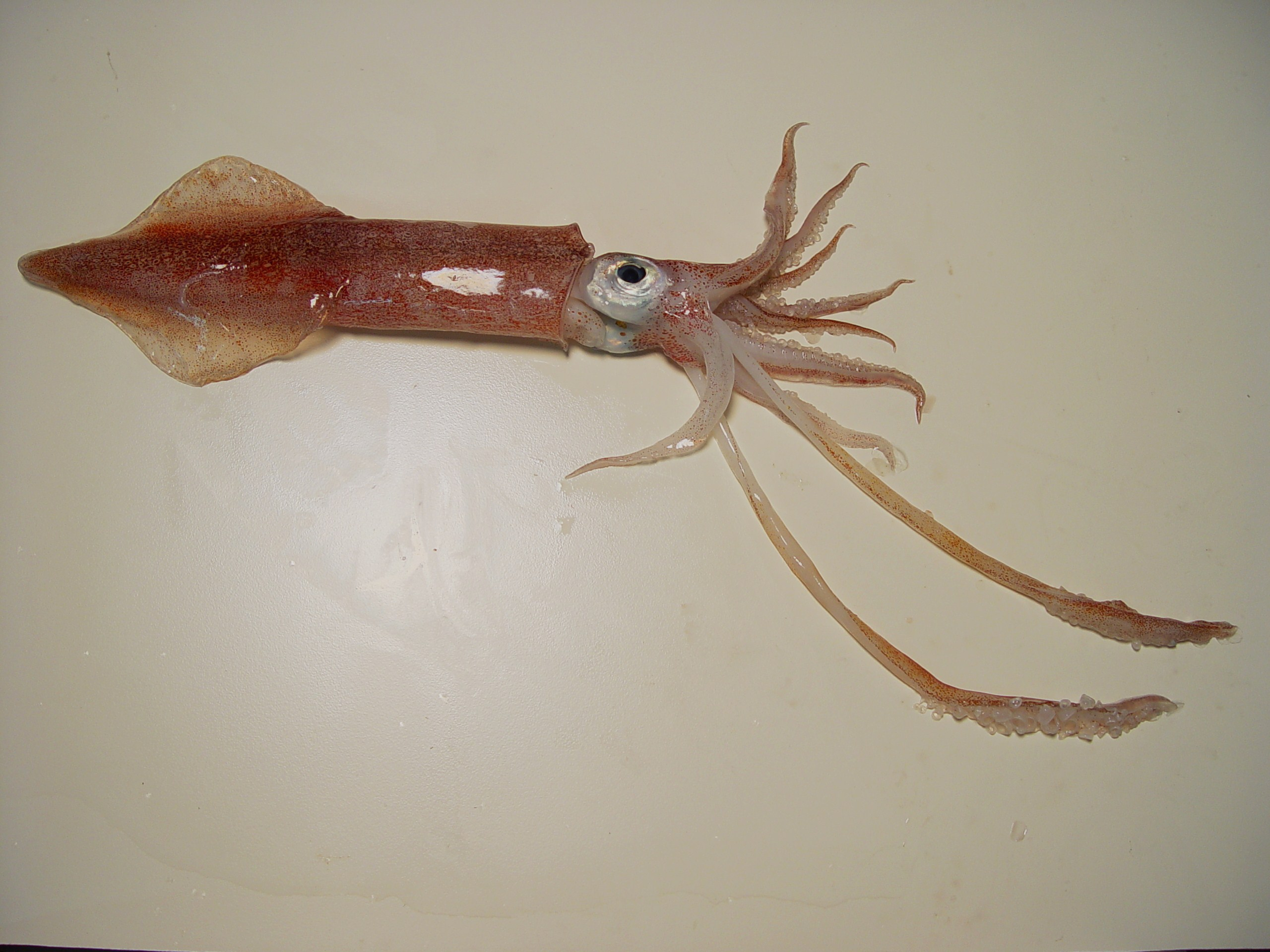
Loligo pealeii

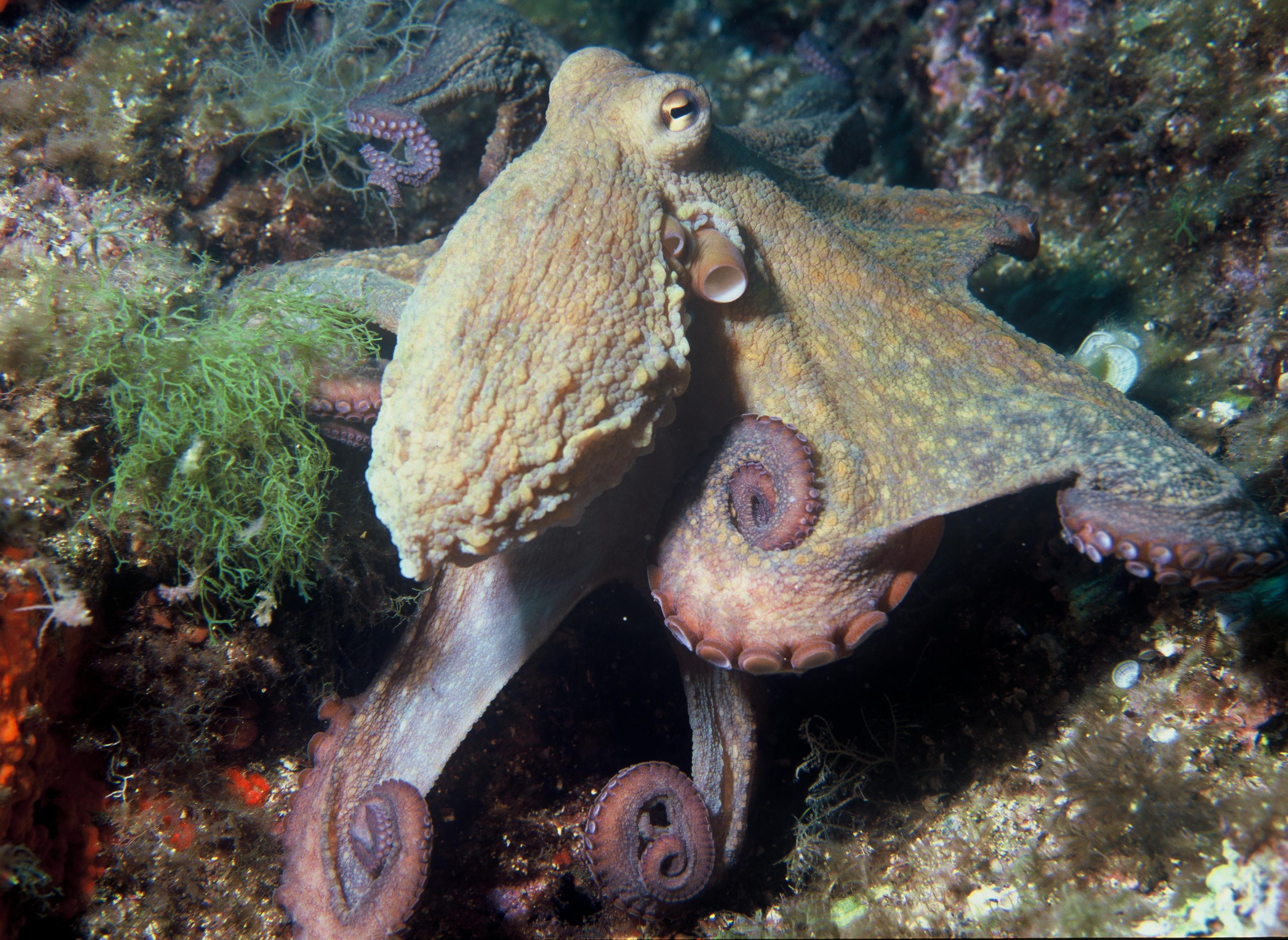
Octopus vulgaris

- Argonauta argo (Linnaeus, 1758)

Loliginidae

- Loligo pealei Lesueur 1821
- Lolliguncula brevis (Blainville, 1823)
- Sepioteuthis sepioidea (Blainville, 1823)

Octopodidae

- Octopus briareus Robson, 1919
- Octopus burryi Voss, 1950
- Octopus defilippis Verany, 1851
- Octopus hummelincki Adam, 1936
- Octopus joubini Robson, 1929
- Octopus vulgaris Cuvier, 1797
- Octopus zonatus Voss, 1968

Spirulidae

- Spirula spirula (Linnaeus, 1758)

Thysanoteuthidae

- Thysanoteuthys rhombus Troschel, 1857

== See also ==
- List of echinoderms of Venezuela
- List of echinoderms of Venezuela
- List of Poriferans of Venezuela
- List of introduced molluscs of Venezuela
- List of molluscs of Falcón state, Venezuela
- List of non-marine molluscs of El Hatillo Municipality, Miranda, Venezuela
- List of non-marine molluscs of Venezuela
- List of birds of Venezuela
- List of mammals of Venezuela
