= List of molluscs of Falcón State, Venezuela =

Map showing in red the position of Falcón State within the country of Venezuela in pale yellow

Falcón State is a state on the coast in the northwestern part of the country of Venezuela. Falcón State covers a total surface area of 24,800 km^{2} and, in 2010, had an estimated population of 950,057. There are four national parks in the state: the Médanos de Coro National Park, the Cueva de la Quebrada del Toro, Morrocoy, and Juan Crisóstomo Falcón National Park.

A large number of species of terrestrial, freshwater and marine molluscs are found in the wild in Falcón State. However, most of the marine mollusks in the area are the same species that occur elsewhere in the Caribbean faunal zone.

This is a partial list of the molluscs of Falcón State. The families are listed alphabetically within the classes. Whether the family is marine, terrestrial or freshwater is indicated after the name of the family, but there is no attempt to separate marine species from non-marine species.

== Class Gastropoda ==
Achatinidae – terrestrial

- Achatina fulica (Bowdick, 1822)

Acmaeidae – marine

- Patelloida pustulata (Helbling, 1779)
- Tectura antillarum (Sowerby, 1831)
- Lottia leucopleura (Gmelin, 1791)

Cylichnidae – marine

- Acteocina canaliculata (Say, 1822)

Aplustridae - marine

- Hydatina vesicaria (Lightfoot, 1786)

Aplysiidae – marine

- Aplysia dactylomela Rang, 1828

Ampullariidae - freshwater

- Marisa cornuarietis (Linnaeus, 1756)
- Pomacea chemnitzii (Philippi, 1852)
- Pomacea falconensis Pain & Arias, 1958
- Pomacea glauca (Linnaeus, 1756)
- Pomacea superba Marshall, 1928

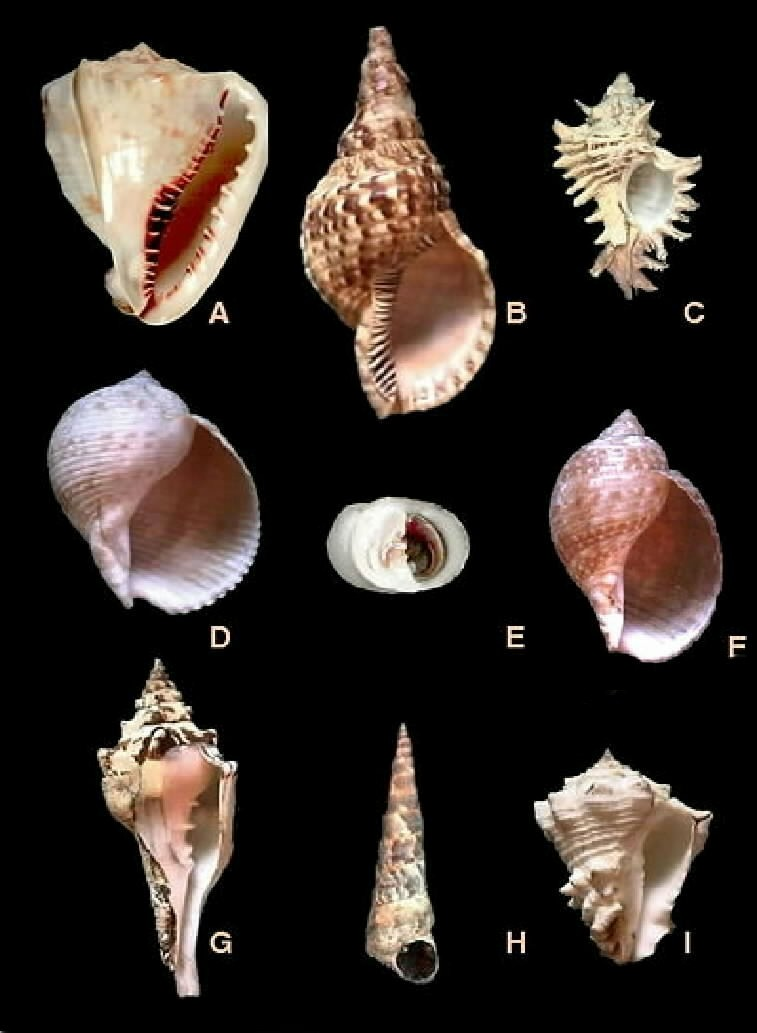
Moluscos del Estado Falcón A. Cassis madagascariensis (Cassidae), B.Charonia variegata (Cymatiidae), C. Chicoreus brevifrons (Muricidae) D. Tonna galea (Tonnidae), E. Nerita peloronta (Neritidae), F. Tonna maculosa (Tonnidae), G. Turbinella angulata (Turbinellidae), H. Turritella variegata (Turritellidae), I. Vasum muricatum (Turbinellidae).

Architectonicidae – marine

- Architectonica nobilis Roding, 1798
- Heliacus cylindricus (Gmelin, 1791)

Buccinidae – marine

- Pisania pusio (Linneo, 1758)
- Pisania auritula (Link, 1807)
- Pisania lineata (Conrad, 1846)
- Engina turbinella (Kiener, 1835)
- Pallacera guadalupensis (Petit, 1852)
- Babylonia areolata (Link, 1807)

Bulimulidae – terrestrial

- Eudolichotis distorta (Bruguiere)
- Plekocheilus blainvillianus (Pfeiffer)

Bullidae – marine

- Bulla striata Bruguiére, 1792
- Bulla solida (Gmelin, 1791)

Bursidae – marine

- Bursa bufo (Bruguiere, 1792)
- Bursa granularis cubaniana (Orbigny, 1842)

Caecidae – marine

- Caecum pulchellum Stimpson, 1851
- Caecum ryssotitum Folin, 1867

Cancellariidae – marine

- Cancellaria reticulata (Linneo, 1767)

Cassidae – marine

- Phalium granulatum (Borm, 1778)
- Cypraecassis testiculus (Linneo, 1758)
- Sconsia striata (Lamarck, 1816)
- Cassis madagascariensis Lamarck, 1822
- Cassis tuberosa (Linneo, 1758)

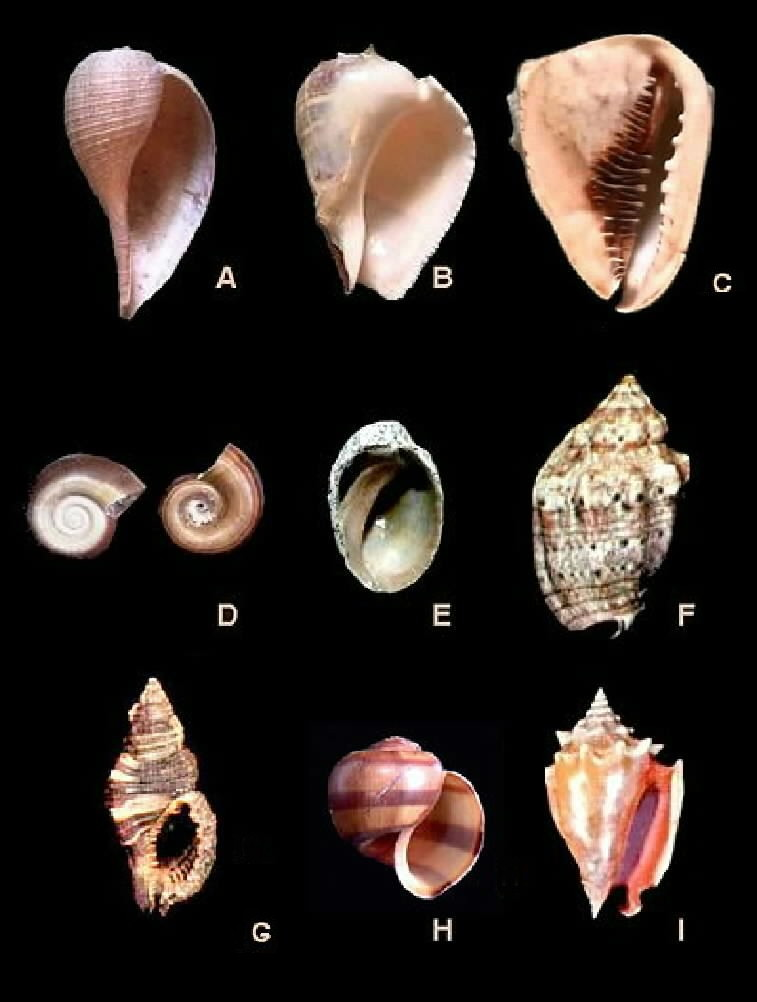
Moluscos del Estado Falcón A. Ficus communis (Ficidae), B. Melongena melongena (Melongenidae), C.Cassis tuberosa (Cassidae), D. Marisa cornuarietis (Ampullariidae), E. Purpura patula (Muricidae), F. Voluta musica (Volutidae), G. Cymatium martinianum (Cymatiidae), H. Pomacea glauca (Ampullariidae), I. Strombus pugilis (Strombidae)

Cerithiidae – marine

- Cerithium litteratum (Born, 1778)
- Cerithium guinaicum Philippi, 1849
- Cerithium eburneum Bruguiere, 1792
- Cerithium lutosum Menke, 1828
- Cerithium algicola C.B. Adams, 1848
- Cerithium atratum (Born, 1778)
- Bittium varium (Pfeiffer, 1840)

Columbellidae – marine

- Columbella mercatoria Linneo, 1758
- Anachis obesa C.B. Adams, 1845
- Nitidella laevigata (Linneo, 1758)
- Mazatlania aciculata (Lamarck, 1822)
- Rhombinella laevigata (Linneo, 1758)
- Mitrella argus Orbigny, 1842

Conidae – marine

- Conus puncticulatus Hwass, 1792
- Conus mus Hwass, 1792
- Conus austini Rehder & Abbott, 1951
- Conus spurius Gmelin, 1791
- Conus centurio Born, 1778

Calyptraeidae – marine

- Calyptraea centralis (Conrad, 1841)
- Crucibulum marense Weisbord
- Crucibulum auricula (Gmelin, 1791)
- Crepidula convexa Say, 1822
- Crepidula plana Say, 1822

Cymatiidae – marine

- Cymatium pileare martinianum Orbigny, 1842
- Cymatium cingulatum (Lamarck, 1822)
- Cymatium muricinum (Roding, 1798)
- Cymatium parthenopeum (Von Salis, 1793)
- Cymatium moritinctum caribbaeum Clench & Turner, 1957
- Charonia variegata (Lamarck, 1816)
- Distorsio clathrata (Lamarck, 1816)

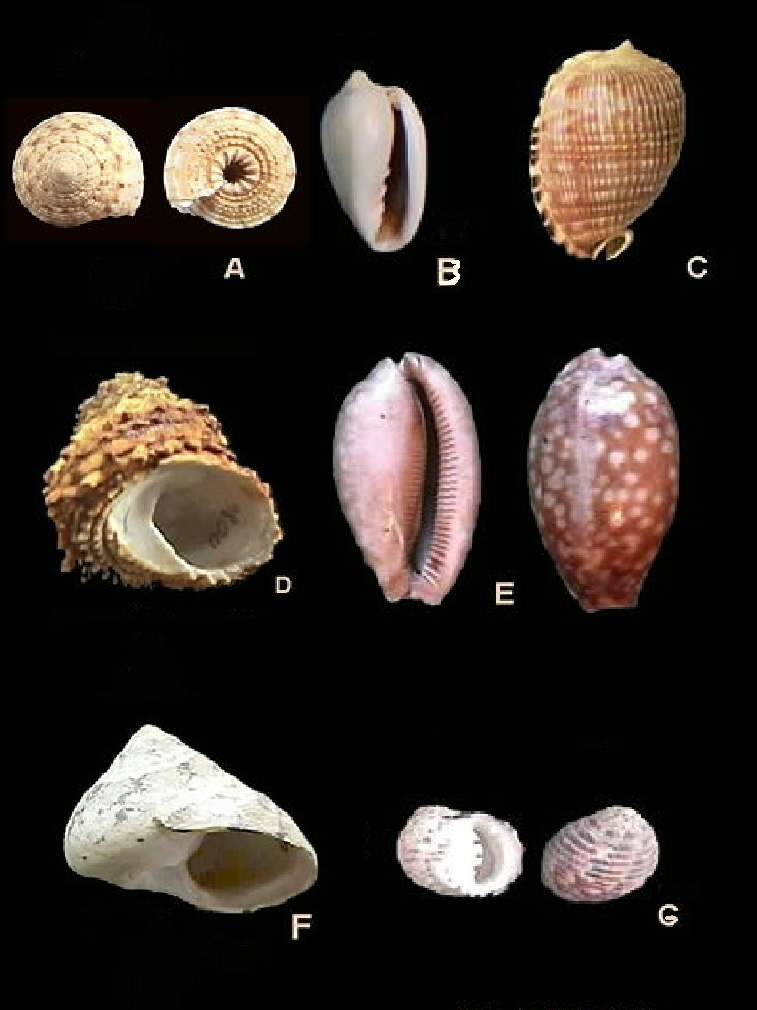
Moluscos del Estado Falcón A. Architectonica nobilis (Architectonicidae), B. Bulla solida (Bullidae), C. Cypraecassis testiculus (Cassidae) D. Astraea caelata (Astreidae), E: Cypraea zebra (Cypraeidae), F. Cittarium pica (Trochidae), G. Nerita versicolor (Neritidae

Cypraeidae – marine

- Cypraea zebra Linneo, 1758
- Cypraea spurca acicularis Gmelin, 1791
- Siphocypraea mus Linneo, 1758

Dorididae – marine

- Glossodoris bayeri Marcus & Marcus, 1967

Eratoidae – marine

- Trivia pediculus (Linneo, 1758)

Epitoniidae – marine

- Epitonium lamellosum (Lamarck, 1822)

Fasciolariidae – marine

- Fasciolaria hollisteri (Weisbord, 1962)
- Leucozonia nassa (Gmelin, 1791)
- Latirus infundibulum (Gmelin, 1791)
- Fusinus helenae Bartsch, 1939
- Fusinus closter (Philippi, 1850)
- Fusinus bitteri Gibson-Smith

Ficidae – marine

- Ficus communis Roding, 1798

Fissurellidae – marine

- Fissurella nodosa (Born, 1778)
- Fissurella nimbosa Linneo, 1758
- Diodora jaumei Aguayo & Rehder, 1936
- Diodora cayenensis (Lamarck, 1822)
- Diodora listeri (Orbigny, 1842)
- Hemitoma octoradiata (Gmelin, 1791)
- Lucapina philippiana (Finlay, 1930)
- Lucapina sowerbii (Sowerby, 1835)

Haliotidae – marine

- Haliotis pourtalesii Dall, 1881)

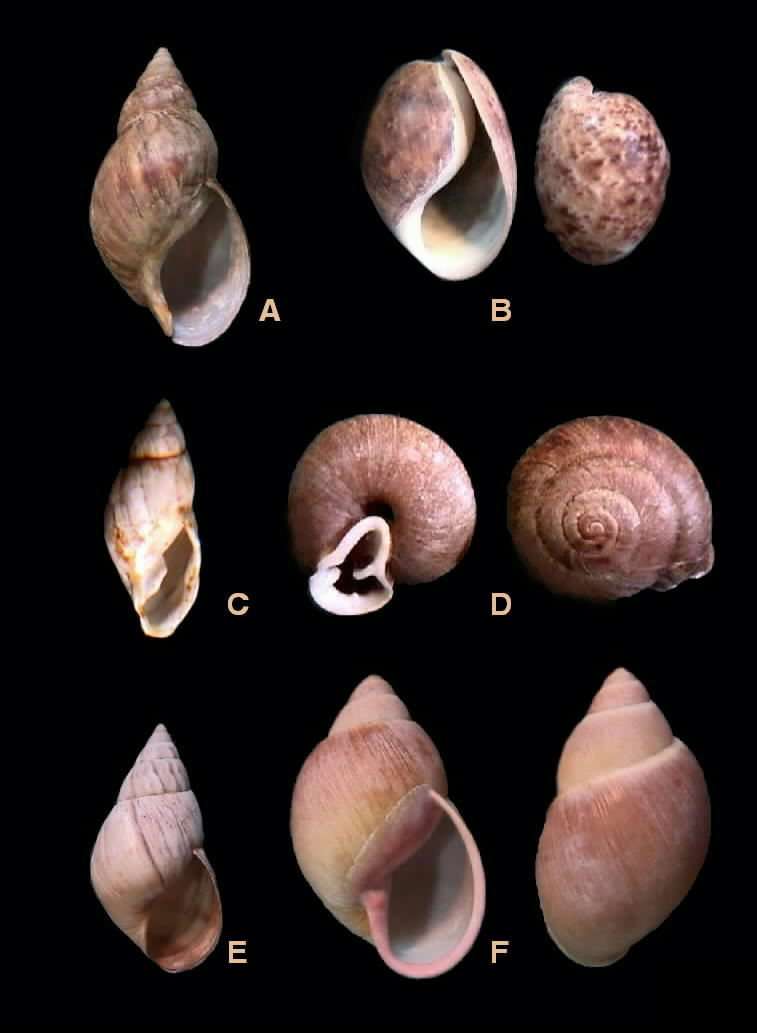
Moluscos del Estado Falcón A. Achatina fulica (Achatinidae), B. Bulla striata (Bullidae), C. Eudolichotis distorta (Bulimulidae), D. Labyrinthus umbrus (Pleurodontidae), E: Orthalicus maracaibensis (Orthalicidae), F: Strophocheilus oblongus (Strophocheilidae).

Haminoeidae – marine

- Haminoea antillarum (Orbigny, 1841)
- Haminoea succinea (Conrad, 1846)

Hipponicidae – marine

- Hipponix antiquatus (Linneo, 1767)

Hydrobiidae – freshwater

- Potamopyrgus ernesti (Martens, 1873)

Janthinidae – marine

- Janthina globosa Swainson, 1822

Littorinidae – marine

- Littorina nebulosa (Lamarck, 1822)
- Littorina angulifera (Lamarck, 1822)
- Littorina lineolata Orbigny, 1840
- Littorina angustior Morch, 1876
- Nodilittorina tuberculata (Menke, 1828)
- Tectarius muricatus (Linneo, 1758)

Marginellidae – marine

- Marginella prunum (Gmelin, 1791)
- Marginella circumvitata Weisbord, 1962
- Persicula interruptolineata (Muhlfeld, 1816)
- Hyalina albolineata (Orbigny, 1842)

Strophocheilidae – terrestrial

- Megalobulimus oblongus (Müller 1774)

Ellobiidae – terrestrial

- Melampus coffeus (Linneo, 1758)

Eulimidae – marine

- Melanella intermedia (Cantraine, 1835)

Melongenidae – marine

- Melongena melongena (Linneo, 1758)
- Melongena corona (Gmelin, 1791)

Mitridae – marine

- Mitra nodulosa (Gmelin, 1791)

Modulidae – marine

- Modulus modulus (Linneo, 1758)

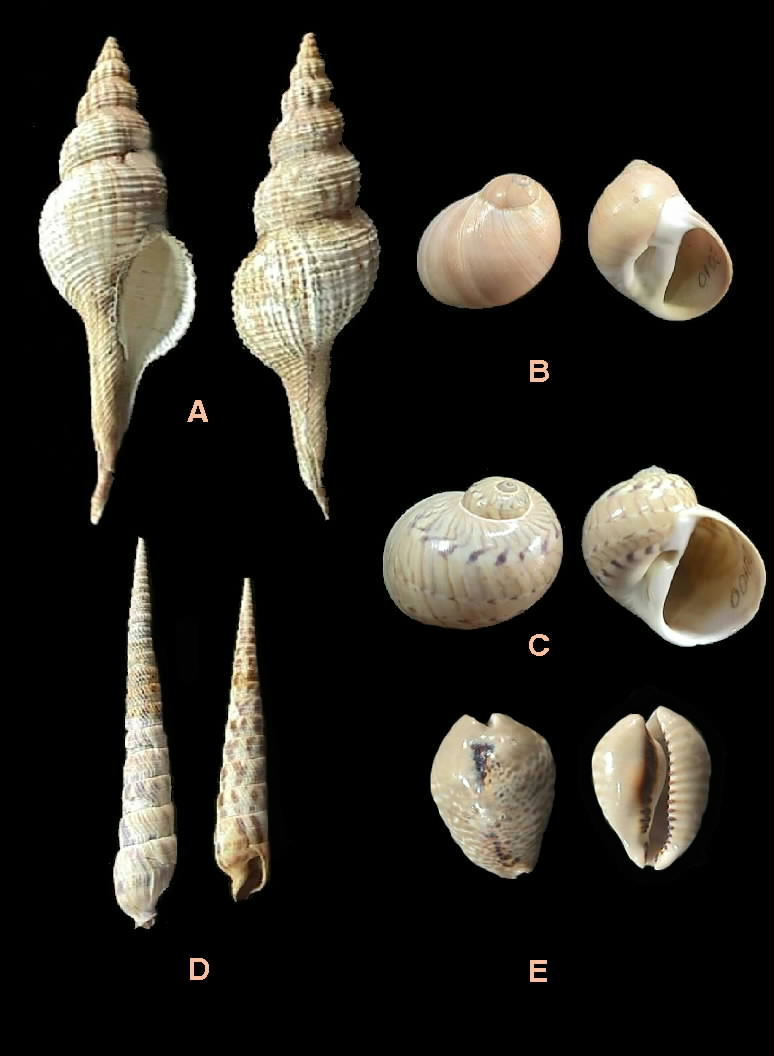
Moluscos del Estado Falcón A. Fusinus closter (Fasciolariidae), B. Polinices lacteus (Naticidae), C. Naticarius canrena (Naticidae) D. Terebra taurina (Terebridae), E. Siphocypraea mus (Cypraeidae).

Muricidae – marine

- Chicoreus brevifrons Lamarck, 1822
- Morula nodulosa (C.B. Adams, 1845)
- Murex donmoorei Bullis, 1964
- Murex cabritii Bemardi, 1859
- Murex chrysostomus Sowerby, 1834
- Murex margaritensis Abbott, 1958
- Murex formosus Sowerby, 1841
- Purpura patula Linneo, 1758
- Thais rustica (Lamarck, 1822)
- Thais deltoidea (Lamarck, 1822)
- Thais haemastoma floridana Conrad, 1837

Naticidae – marine

- Naticarius canrena (Linneo, 1758)
- Natica marochiensis (Gmelin, 1791)
- Polinices hepaticus (Roding, 1798)
- Polinices lacteus (Guilding, 1834)
- Sinum maculatum (Say, 1831)

Nassariidae – marine

- Nassarius vibex (Say, 1822)

Neocyclotidae – terrestrial

- Poteria dysoni (Pfeifer)

Neritidae – marine and freshwater

- Nerita peloronta Linneo, 1758
- Nerita versicolor Gmelin, 1791
- Nerita tessellata Gmelin, 1791
- Nerita fulgurans Gmelin, 1791
- Neritina meleagris Lamarck, 1822
- Neritina piratica Russel, 1940
- Neritina virginea (Linneo, 1758)
- Neritina reclivata (Say, 1822)
- Smaragdia viridis maris (Linneo, 1758)

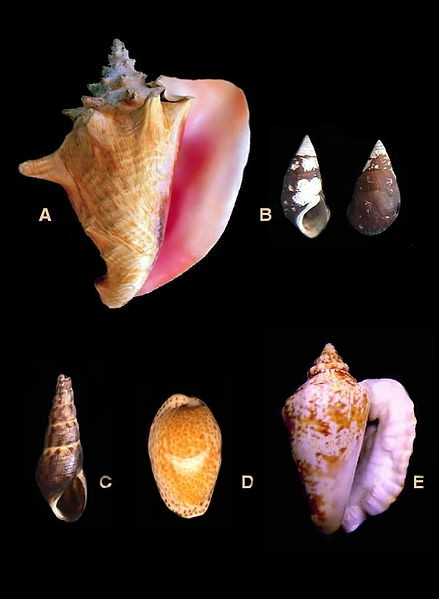
Moluscos del Estado Falcón A. Strombus gigas (Strombidae), B. Pachychilus laevissimus (Pachychilidae), C. Melanoides tuberculata (Thiaridae), D.Cypraea spurca acicularis (Cypraeidae), E: Strombuss raninus (Strombidae).

Olividae – marine

- Oliva schepmani Weisbord, 1962
- Oliva scripta Lamarck, 1810
- Olivella minuta (Link, 1807)
- Ancilla glabrata (Linneo, 1758)

Orthalicidae – terrestrial

- Drymaeus knorri (Pfeffer, 1846)
- Orthalicus maracaibensis (Pfeiffer)

Ovulidae – marine

- Cyphoma intermedium Cate, 1973
- Cyphoma gibbosum (Linneo, 1758)

Pachychilidae – terrestrial

- Pachychilus laevissimus (Sowerby, 1824)

Phasianellidae – marine

- Tricolia affinis (C.B. Adams, 1850)
- Tricolia thalassicola Robertson, 1958
- Tricolia tessellata (Potiez & Hichaud, 1838)

Planaxidae – marine

- Planaxis nucleus (Bruguiere, 1789)

Planorbidae – freshwater

- Drepanotrema aheum Baker, 1930
- Drepanotrema cimex pistiae Baker, 1930

Pleurodontidae – terrestrial

- Labyrinthus leucodon (Pfeiffer, 1847)
- Labyrinthus umbrus (Thompson, 1957)

Potamididae – marine

- Cerithidea costata (Da Costa, 1778)
- Batillaria minima (Gmelin, 1791)

Rissoinidae – marine

- Rissoina fischeri Desjardin, 1949
- Rissoina bryerea (Montagu, 1803)
- Rissoina decussata (Montagu, 1803)
- Zebina browniana (Orbigny, 1842)
- Alvania auberiana (Orbigny, 1842)

Siphonariidae – marine

- Siphonaria pectinata (Linneo, 1758)

Strombidae – marine

- Strombus pugilis Linneo, 1758
- Strombus raninus Gmelin, 1791
- Strombus gigas Linneo, 1758

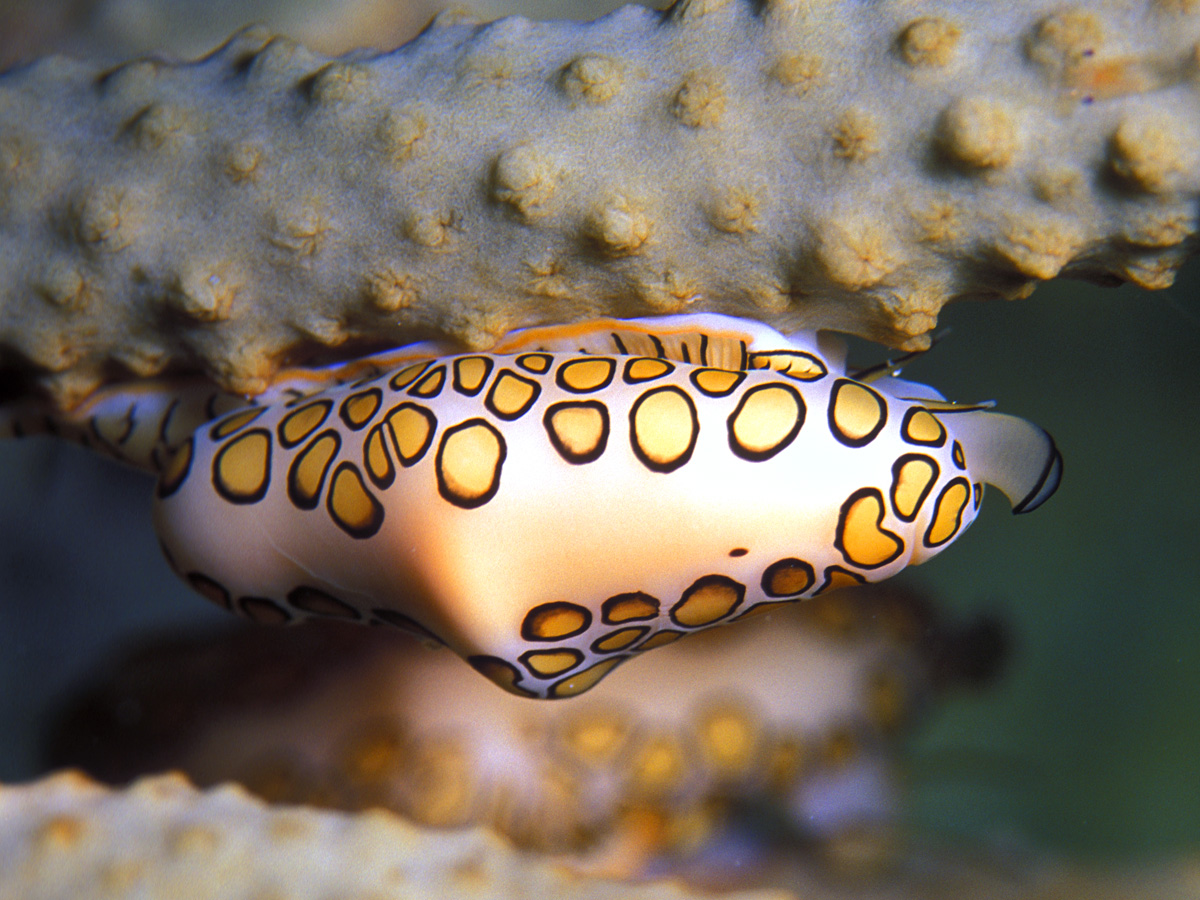
Moluscos del Estado Falcón A. Cyphoma gibbosum (Ovulidae).

Subulinidae – terrestrial

- Leptinaria lamellata (Potiez & Michaud, 1838)
- Opeas beckianum (Pfeifer)
- Opeas pumilum (Pfeifer)
- Subulina octona (Bruguièri, 1792)

Terebridae – marine

- Terebra protexta Conrad 1845
- Terebra cinerea (Born, 1778)
- Terebra taurina Lightfoot, 1786

Thiaridae – freshwater

- Thiara granifera (Lamarck, 1816)
- Melanoides tuberculata (Múller, 1774)

Tonnidae – marine

- Tonna maculosa (Dillwyn, 1817)
- Tonna galea (Linneo, 1758)

Trochidae – marine

- Cittarium pica (Linneo, 1758)
- Calliostoma pulchrum (C.B. Adams, 1850)
- Calliostoma sarcodum Dall
- Tegula fasciata (Born, 1778)
- Tegula viridula (Gmelin, 1791)

Turbinellidae – marine

- Turbinella angulata (Lightfoot, 1786)
- Vasum muricatum (Born, 1778)

Turbinidae – marine

- Turbo castanea Gmelin, 1791
- Astraea brevispina (Lamarck, 1822)
- Astraea tuber (Linneo, 1767)
- Astraea caelata (Gmelin, 1791)

Turridae – marine

- Fusiturrieula paulettae Princz, 1978
- Polystira albida (Perry, 1811)
- Drillia gibbosa (Born, 1778)
- Hindsiclava consors (Sowerby)
- Pyrgocythara candidissima (C.B. Adams, 1845)

Turritellidae – marine

- Turritella variegata (Linneo, 1758)
- Turritella paraguanensis F. Hudson

Urocoptidae – terrestrial

- Brachypodella hanleyana (Pfeiffer)
- Brachypodella leucopleura (Menke, 1847)

Vermetidae – marine

- Serpulorbis decussatus (Gmelin, 1791)

Vitrinellidae – marine

- Teinostoma megastoma (C.B. Adams, 1850)

Volutidae – marine

- Voluta musica Linneo, 1758

== Class Bivalvia ==
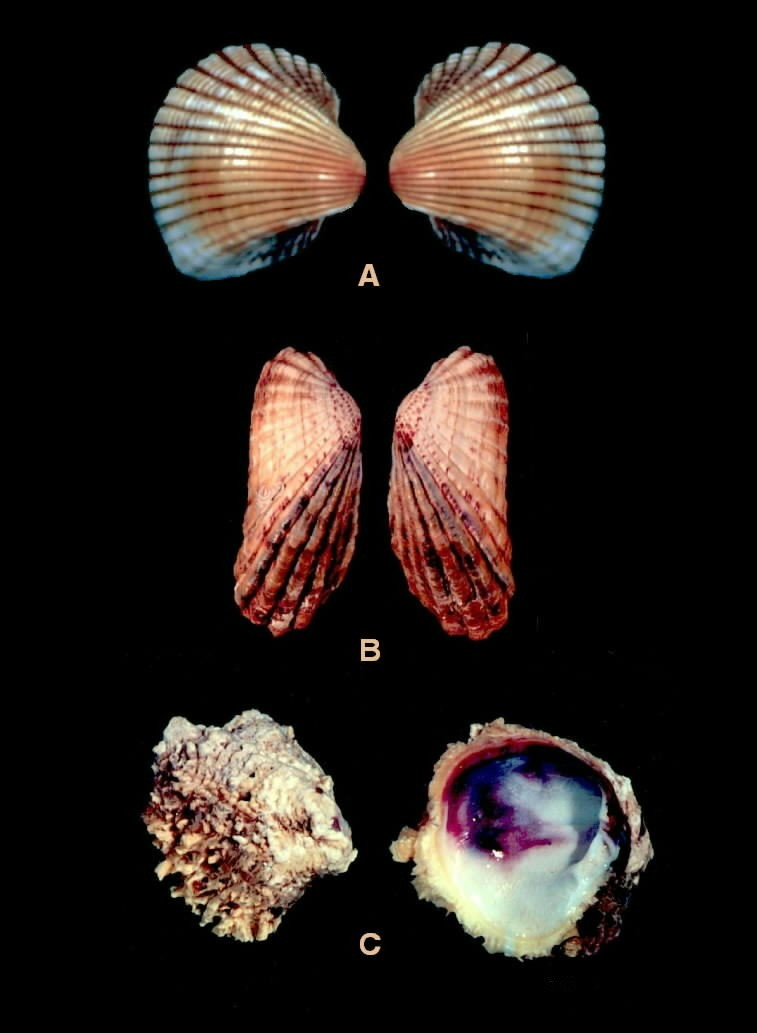
Moluscos del Estado Falcón A. Anadara ovalis (Arcidae), B. Carditamera gracilis (Carditidae), C. Chama macerophylla (Chamidae).

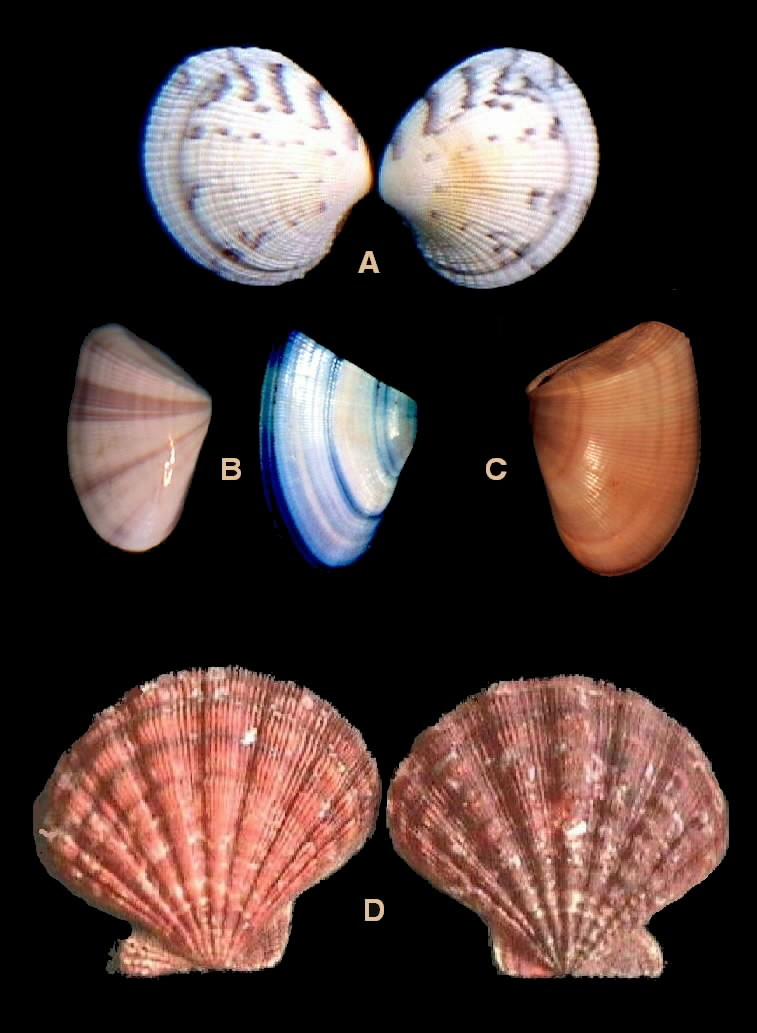
Moluscos del Estado Falcón A. Codakia orbicularis (Lucinidae), B. Donax denticulatus (Donacidae), C. Donax striatus (Donacidae). D. Lyropecten nodosus (Pectinidae).

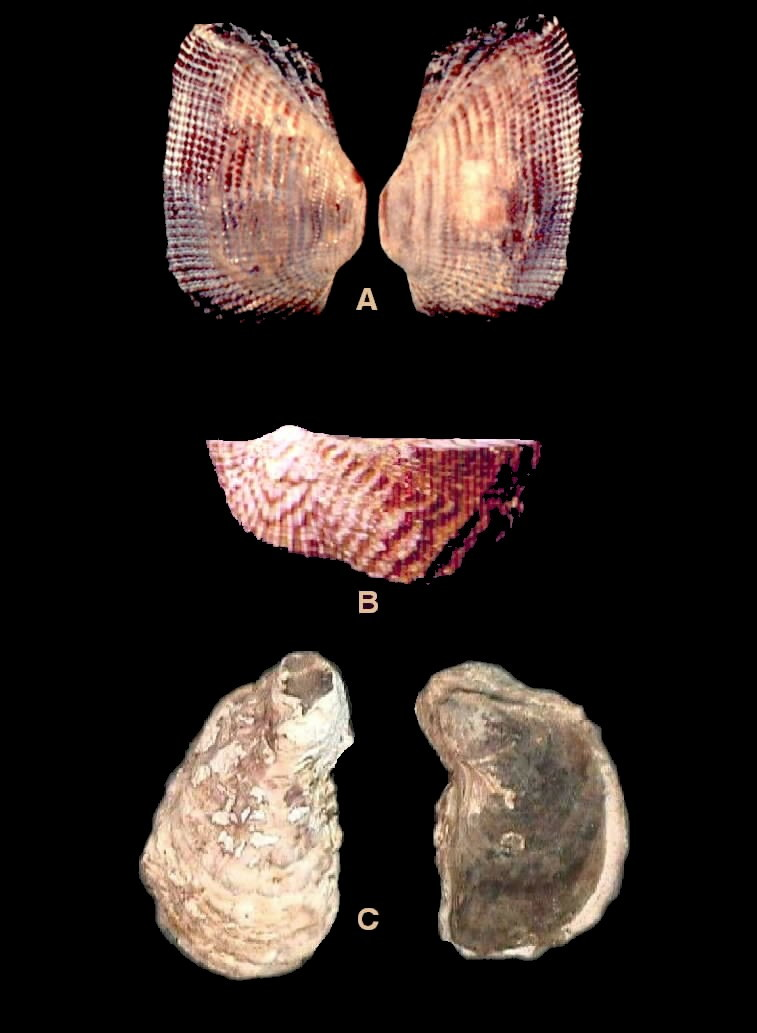
Moluscos del Estado Falcón A. Arca imbricada (Arcidae), B. Arca zebra (Arcidae), C. Crassostrea rhizophorae (Ostreidae).

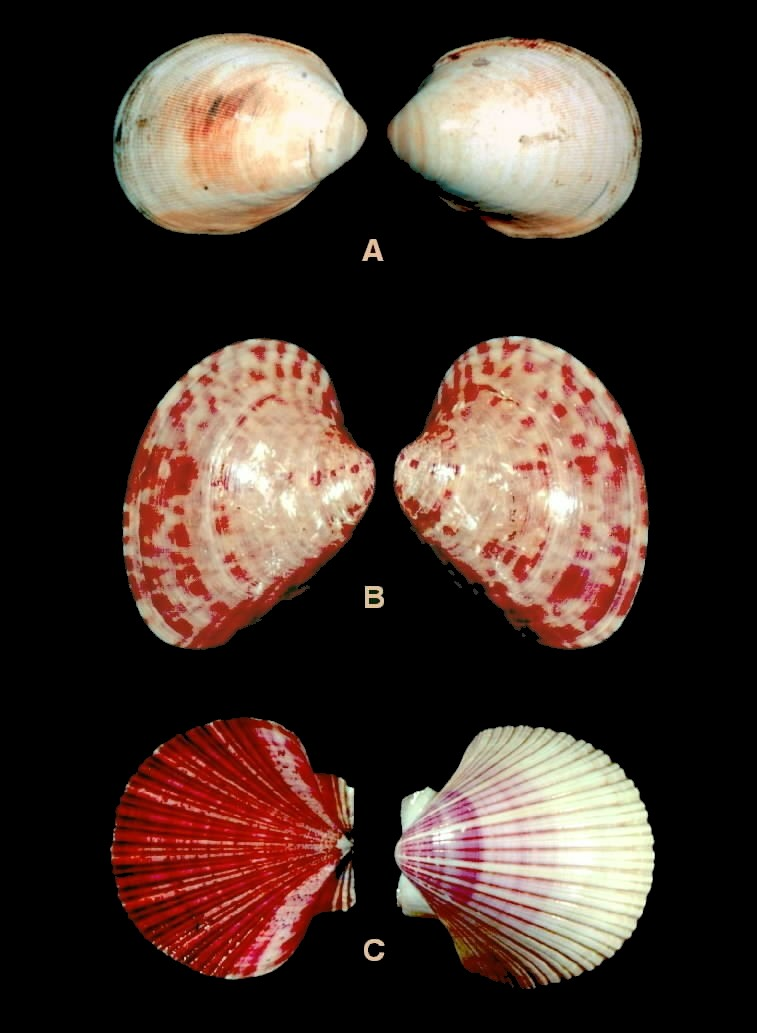
Moluscos del Estado Falcón A. Laevicardium laevigatum (Cardiidae), B. Macrocallista maculata (Veneridae), C. Pecten ziczac (Pectinidae).

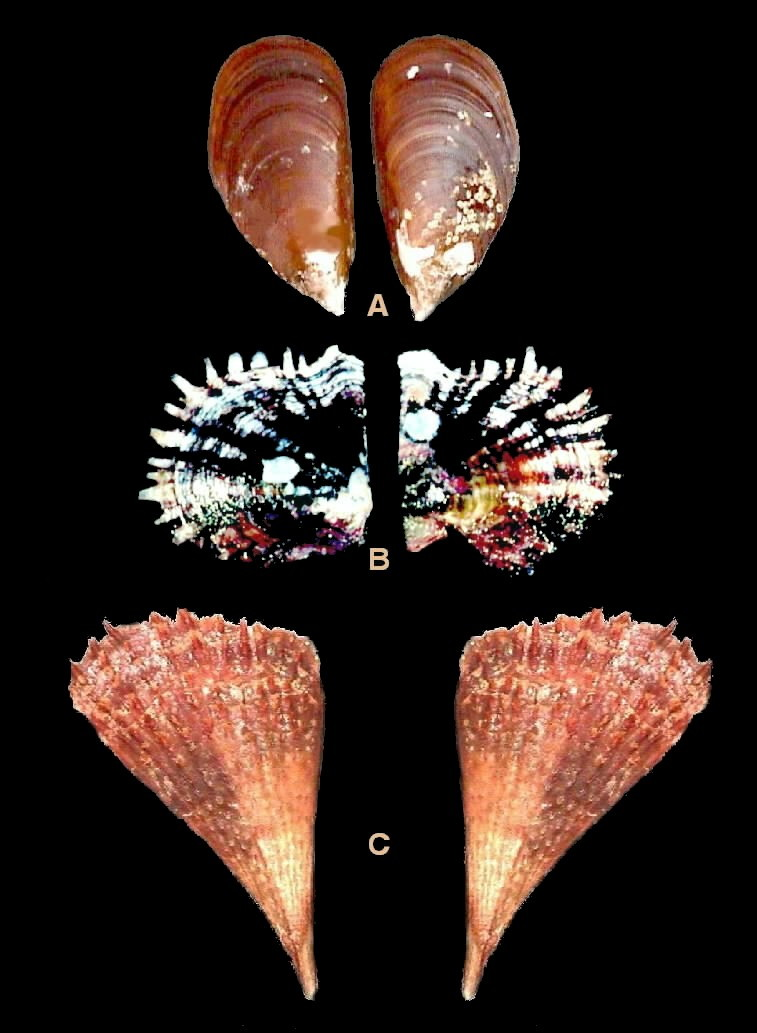
Moluscos del Estado Falcón A. Perna perna (Mytilidae), B. Pinctada imbricada (Pteriidae), C. Pinna carnea (Pinnidae).

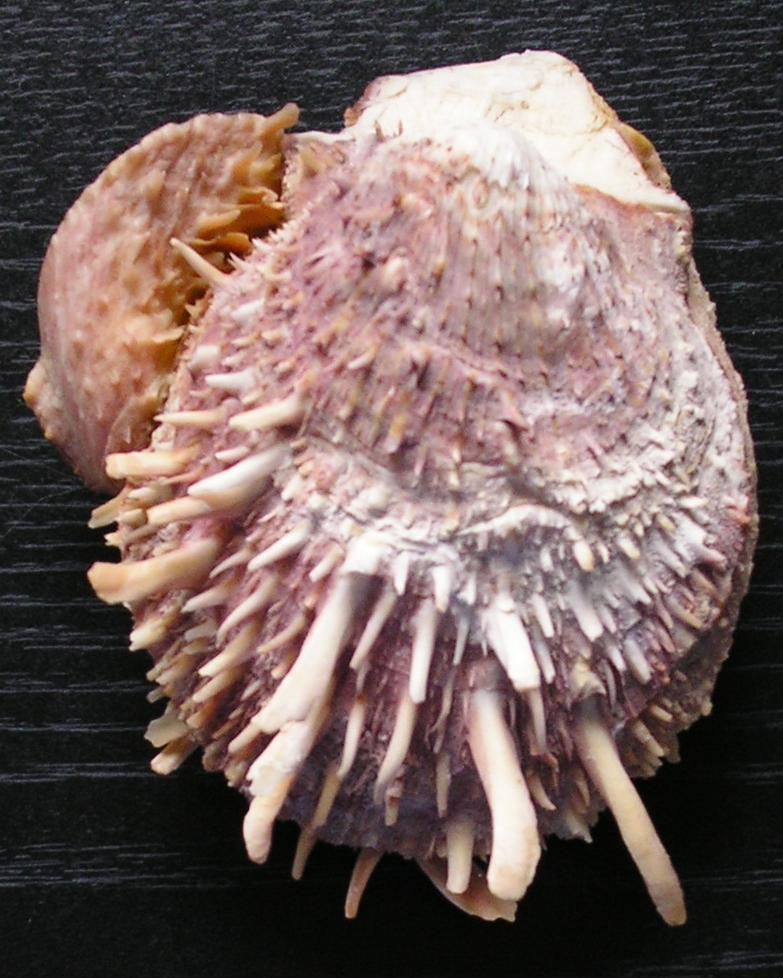
Moluscos del Estado Falcón A. Spondylus americanus (Spondylidae).

Arcidae - marine

- Arca zebra (Swainson, 1833)
- Arca imbricata Bruguiere, 1789
- Barbatia candida (Helbling, 1779)
- Barbatia tenera (C.B. Adams, 1845)
- Barbatia cancellaria (Lamarck, 1819)
- Barbatia domingensis (Lamarck, 1819)
- Anadara floridana (Comad, 1869)
- Anadara brasiliana (Lamarck, 1819)
- Anadara notabilis (Roding, 1798)
- Anadara chemnitzii (Philippi, 1851)
- Anadara ovalis (Bruguiere, 1789)
- Anadara baughmani Hertlein, 1951
- Noetia bisulcata (Lamarck, 1819)
- Arcopsis adamsi (Dall, 1886)

Cardiidae - marine

- Trachycardium isocardia (Linneo, 1758)
- Trachycardium muricatum (Linneo, 1758)
- Papyridea soleniformis (Bruguiere, 1789
- Trigonocardia antillarum (Orbigny, 1842)
- Laevicardium laevigatum (Linneo, 1758)
- Crassinella martinicensis (Orbigny, 1842)

Carditidae - marine

- Carditamera gracilis (Shuttleworth, 1856)

Chamidae - marine

- Chama lactuca Dall, 1886
- Chama macerophylla (Gmelin, 1791)
- Chama florida Lamarck, 1819
- Pseudochama radians (Lamarck, 1819)
- Arcinella arcinella (Unneo, 1767)
- Arcinella cornuta Comad, 1866

Corbulidae - marine

- Corbula aequivalvis Philippi, 1836
- Corbula contracta Say, 1822
- Corbula caribaea Orbigny, 1842

Crassatellidae - marine

- Eucrassatella antillarum (Reeve, 1842)

Donacidae - marine

- Donax denticulatus Linneo, 1758
- Donax striatus Linneo, 1767
- Donax higuerotensis

Dreissenidae - marine

- Mytilopsis sallei Récluz, 1849

Glycymeridae - marine

- Glycymeris castaneus Lamarck
- Glycymeris pectinata (Gmelin, 1791)

Isognomonidae - marine

- Isognomon alatus (Gmelin, 1791)

Limidae - marine

- Lima scabra (Born, 1778)
- Lima pellucida C.B. Adams, 1846

Lucinidae - marine

- Lucina pectinata (Gmelin, 1791)
- Lucina muricata (Spengler, 1798)
- Lucina radians (Conrad, 1841)
- Codakia orbicularis (Linneo, 1758)
- Codakia orbiculata (Montagu, 1808)
- Codakia costata (Orbigny, 1842)
- Divaricella quadrisulcata (Orbigny, 1842)
- Anodontia alba Link, 1807

Mactridae - marine

- Mactra fragilis Gmelin, 1791
- Mactrellona alata (Spengler, 1802)
- Mactrellona iheringi (Dall, 1897)
- Mulinia cleryana (Orbigny, 1846)
- Raeta plicatella (Lamarck, 1818)
- Anatina anatina (Spengler, 1802)

Mytilidae - marine

- Brachidontes modiolus (Linneo, 1767)
- Brachidontes exustus (Linneo, 1758)
- Brachidontes dominguensis (Lamarck, 1819)
- Modiolus americanus (Leach, 1815)
- Musculus lateralis (Say, 1822)
- Perna perna (Linneo, 1758)
- Amygdalum papyrium (Conrad, 1846)

Nuculanidae - marine

- Nuculana acuta (Conrad, 1831)
- Adrana tellinoides (Sowerby, 1823)
- Adrana gloriosa A. Adams

Nuculidae - marine

- Nucula mareana Weisbord, 1964.

Ostreidae - marine

- Crassostrea rhizophorae (Guilding, 1828)
- Lopho frons (Linneo, 1758)

Pectinidae - marine

- Pecten ziczac (Linneo, 1758)
- Amusium papyraceum (Gabb, 1873)
- Amusium laurenti (Gmelin, 1791)
- Aequipecten lineolaris (Lamarck, 1819
- Chamys muscosa (Wood, 1828)
- Aequipecten acanthodes (Dall, 1925)
- Argopecten gibbus (Linneo, 1758)
- Argopecten nucleus (Born, 1778)
- Argopecten irradians amplicostatus Dall, 1898
- Lyropecten nodosus (Linneo, 1758)

Periplomatidae - marine

- Periploma margaritacea (Lamarck, 1801)

Pinnidae - marine

- Atrina rigida (Lightfoot, 1786)
- Atrina venezuelana
- Atrina bitteri Gibson-Smith
- Atrina seminuda (Lamark, 1819)
- Pinna carnea Gmelin, 1791

Pholadidae - marine

- Pholas campechiensis Gmelin, 1791
- Martesia fragilis Verril & Bush, 1890
- Martesia cuneiformis (Say, 1822)

Plicatulidae - marine

- Plicatula gibbosa Lamarck, 1801

Psammobiidae - marine

- Sanguinolaria cruenta (Lightfoot, 1786)
- Heterodonax bimaculatus (Linneo, 1758)

Pteriidae - marine

- Pinctada imbricata Réiding, 1798
- Pteria colymbus (Réiding, 1798)

Semelidae - marine

- Semele projicua (Pulteney, 1799)

Solecurtidae - marine

- Tagelus divisus (Spengler, 1794)
- Tagelus plebeius (Lightfoot, 1786)

Solenidae - marine

- Solen obliquus Spengler, 1794

Spondylidae - marine

- Spondylus ictericus Reeve, 1856
- Spondylus americanus Hermann, 1781

Tellinidae - marine

- Tellina fausta Pultency, 1799
- Tellina lineata Turton, 1819
- Tellina listeri Roding, 1798
- Tellina punicea Born, 1778
- Tellina tirata Turton, 1819
- Tellina sandix Boss, 1968
- Tellina exerythra Boss, 1964
- Macoma constricta (Bruguiere, 1792)
- Macoma tageliformis Dall, 1900
- Macoma brasiliana Dall
- Macoma brevifrons (Say, 1834)
- Strigilla pseudocarnaria Boss, 1969
- Strigilla producta Tryon, 1870
- Psammotreta brevifrons (Say, 1834)

Thraciidae - marine

- Cyathodonta magnifica Jonas, 1850

Ungulinidae - marine

- Diplodonta candeana (Orbigny, 1842)
- Diplodonta semiaspera (Philippi, 1836)

Veneridae - marine

- Circomphalus strigillinus (Dall, 1902)
- Periglypta listeri (Gray, 1838)
- Ventricolaria rigida (Dillwyn, 1817)
- Chione cancellata (Linneo, 1767)
- Chione paphia (Linneo, 1767)
- Chione pubera (Bory-Saint-Vicent, 1827)
- Anomalocardia brasiliana (Gmelin, 1791)
- Protothaca granulata (Gmelin, 1791)
- Tivela mactroides (Born, 1778)
- Pitar arestus (Dall & Simpson, 1901)
- Pitar dione (Linneo, 1758)
- Pitar circinatus (Born, 1778)
- Pitar fulminatus (Menke, 1828)
- Pitar albidus (Gmelin, 1791)
- Macrocallista maculata (Linneo, 1758)
- Cyclinella tenuis (Récluz, 1852)
- Dosinia concentrica (Born, 1778)
- Petricola lapicida (Gmelin, 1791)

== Class Cephalopoda ==
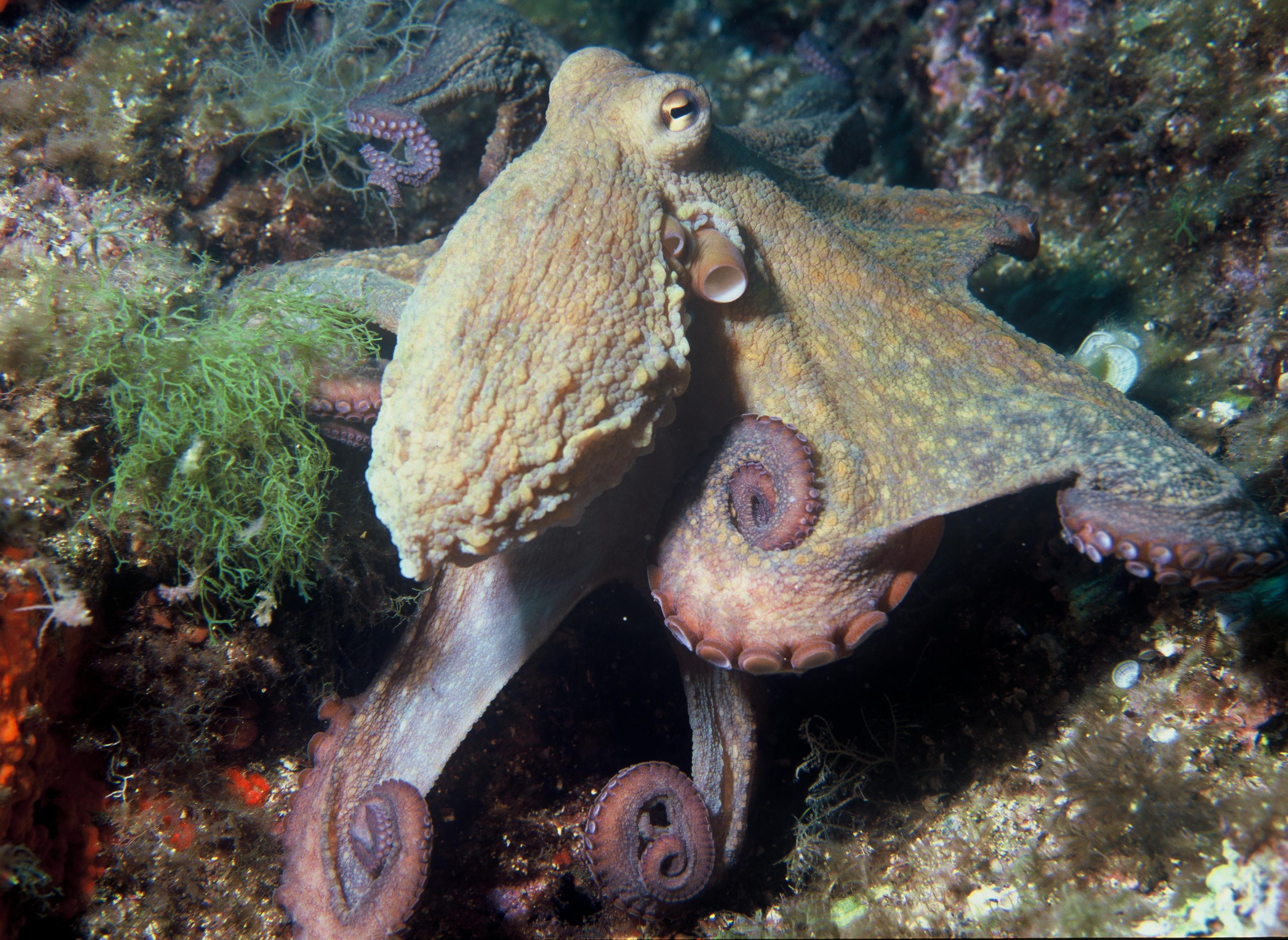
Octopus vulgaris

Loliginidae - marine

- Loligo pealei (Lesueur, 1821
- Lolliguncula brevis (Blainville, 1823)
- Sepioteuthis sepioidea (Blainville, 1823)

Octopodidae - marine

- Octopus vulgaris Cuvier, 1797
- Octopus joubini Robson, 1929

Spirulidae - marine

- Spirula spirula (Linneo, 1758)

Thysanoteuthidae - marine

- Thysanoteuthis rhombus Troschel, 1857

== Class Scaphopoda ==
Dentaliidae - marine

- Dentalium laqueatum Verri1, 1885

Siphonodentallidae - marine

- Cadulus quadridentatus (Dall, 1881)

== Class Polyplacophora ==
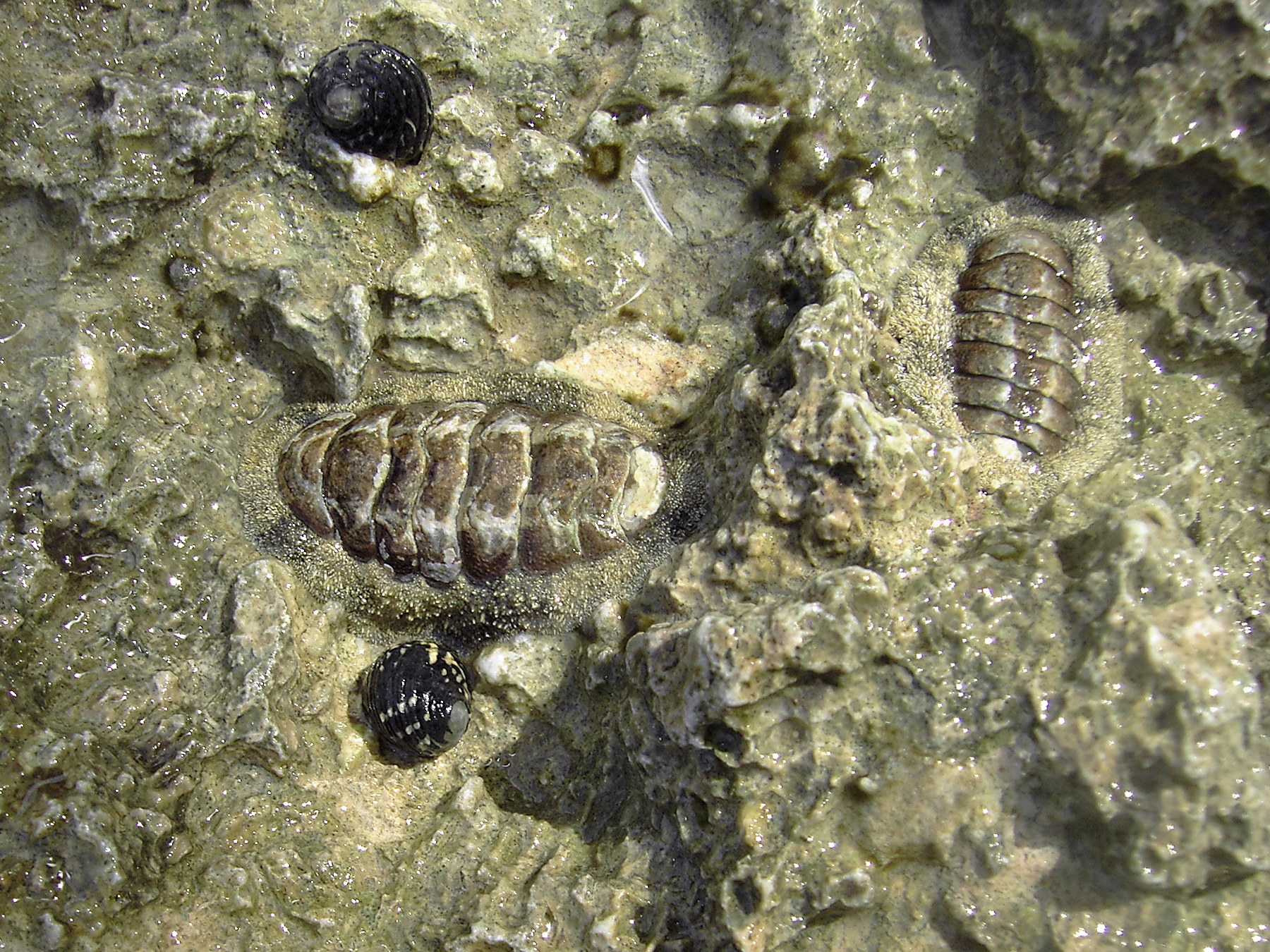
Acanthopleura granulata

Chitonidae - marine

- Acanthopleura granulata (Gmelin, 1791)
- Chiton marmoratus Gmelin, 1791
- Chiton tuberculatus Linneo, 1758

== See also ==
- List of echinoderms of Venezuela
- List of Poriferans of Venezuela
- List of introduced molluscs of Venezuela
- List of marine molluscs of Venezuela
- List of non-marine molluscs of El Hatillo Municipality, Miranda, Venezuela
- List of non-marine molluscs of Venezuela
- List of birds of Venezuela
- List of mammals of Venezuela
