= Molluscs of Venezuela =

Molluscs of Venezuela may refer to:

- List of introduced molluscs of Venezuela
- List of molluscs of Falcón State, Venezuela
- List of marine molluscs of Venezuela
- List of non-marine molluscs of Venezuela
  - List of non-marine molluscs of El Hatillo Municipality, Miranda, Venezuela
