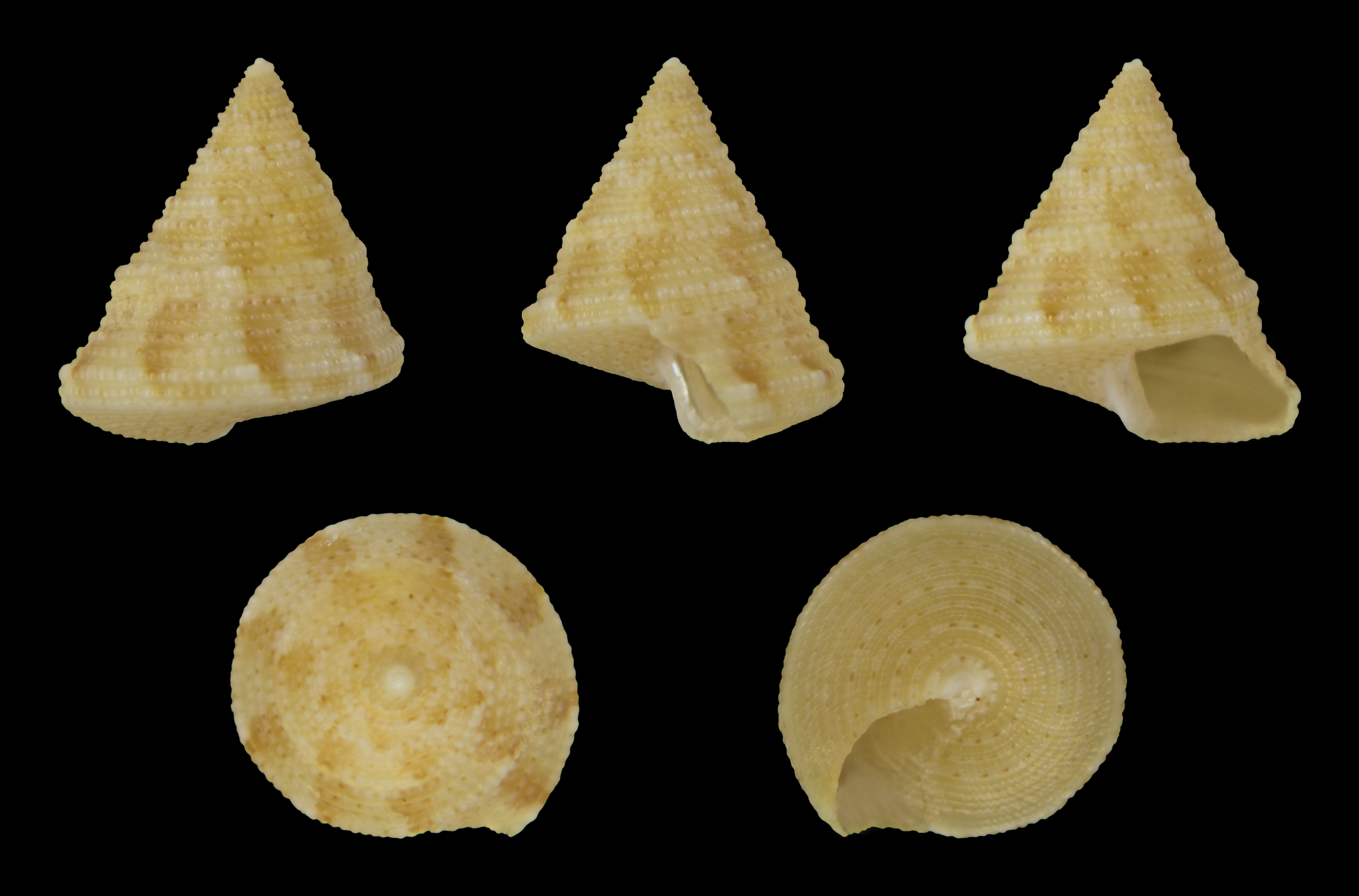

Scientific classification
- Kingdom: Animalia
- Phylum: Mollusca
- Class: Gastropoda
- Subclass: Vetigastropoda
- Order: Trochida
- Family: Calliostomatidae
- Genus: Calliostoma
- Species: C. pulchrum

Binomial name
- Calliostoma pulchrum (C. B. Adams, 1850)

Synonyms
- Calliostoma pulcher C.B. Adams, 1850; Calliostoma veliei Pilsbry, H.A., 1900; Trochus pulcher C. B. Adams, 1850 (original combination)

= Calliostoma pulchrum =

Species of gastropod

Calliostoma pulchrum, common name the beautiful top shell, is a species of sea snail, a marine gastropod mollusk in the family Calliostomatidae.

== Description ==
The size of the shell varies between 8 mm and 16 mm. The shell has a much elevated conical shape. It has a pale claret color, with a dark brown, acute apex, and large ill-defined spots of white. It shows a spiral series of minute dark red oblong spots, which are proportioned to the size of the spiral ridges on which they are placed. The ridges of least size are not spotted. The shell is solid, with ten or twelve minute spiral ridges, of which one near the base of the whorls is larger, and three are of an intermediate size, viz., one on each side of the suture and one on the middle of the whorls. On the lower side of the body whorl are sixteen or eighteen other minute revolving ridges, of which every second or third is spotted. The spire has the outlines nearly rectilinear. The seven and one-half whorls are a little concave, acutely prominent in the lower part. The subangular body whorl is moderately convex beneath. The subquadrate aperture is iridescent within. The columella is subtruncate. There is no umbilicus.

== Distribution ==
This species occurs in the Caribbean Sea, the Gulf of Mexico, off the West Indies and in the Atlantic Ocean off North Carolina to West Florida, USA, at depths between 1 m and 366 m.
