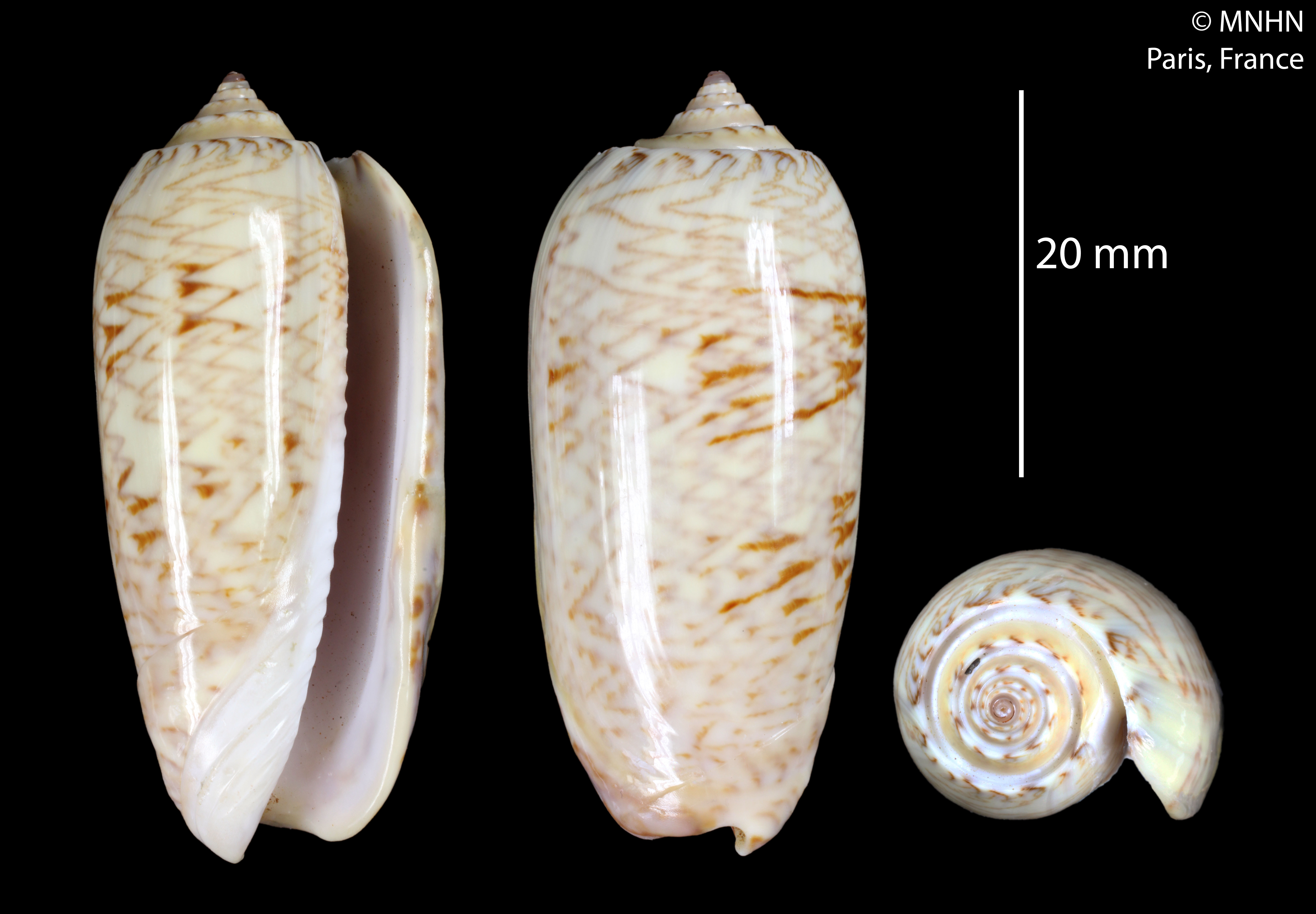
- Shell of Oliva scripta (specimen at MNHN, Paris)

Scientific classification
- Kingdom: Animalia
- Phylum: Mollusca
- Class: Gastropoda
- Subclass: Caenogastropoda
- Order: Neogastropoda
- Family: Olividae
- Genus: Oliva
- Species: O. scripta

Binomial name
- Oliva scripta Lamarck, 1811

Synonyms
- Oliva (Cariboliva) scripta Lamarck, 1811 accepted, alternate representation; Oliva caribaeensis Dall & Simpson, 1901; Oliva scripta scripta Lamarck, 1811; Oliva scripta venezuelana Petuch & Sargent, 1986; Oliva trujilloi Clench, 1938

= Oliva scripta =

Species of gastropod

Oliva scripta, commonly named the Caribbean olive, is a species of sea snail, a marine gastropod mollusk in the family Olividae, the olives.

== Description ==
The length of the shell varies between 25 mm and 60 mm.

== Distribution ==
Trawled by shrimpers working tropical Western Atlantic continental shelf areas. Also known from traps set at depths of 120 metres, offshore West coast Barbados, Lesser Antilles.

This species occurs in the Caribbean Sea, the Gulf of Mexico; off Colombia and Brazil.
