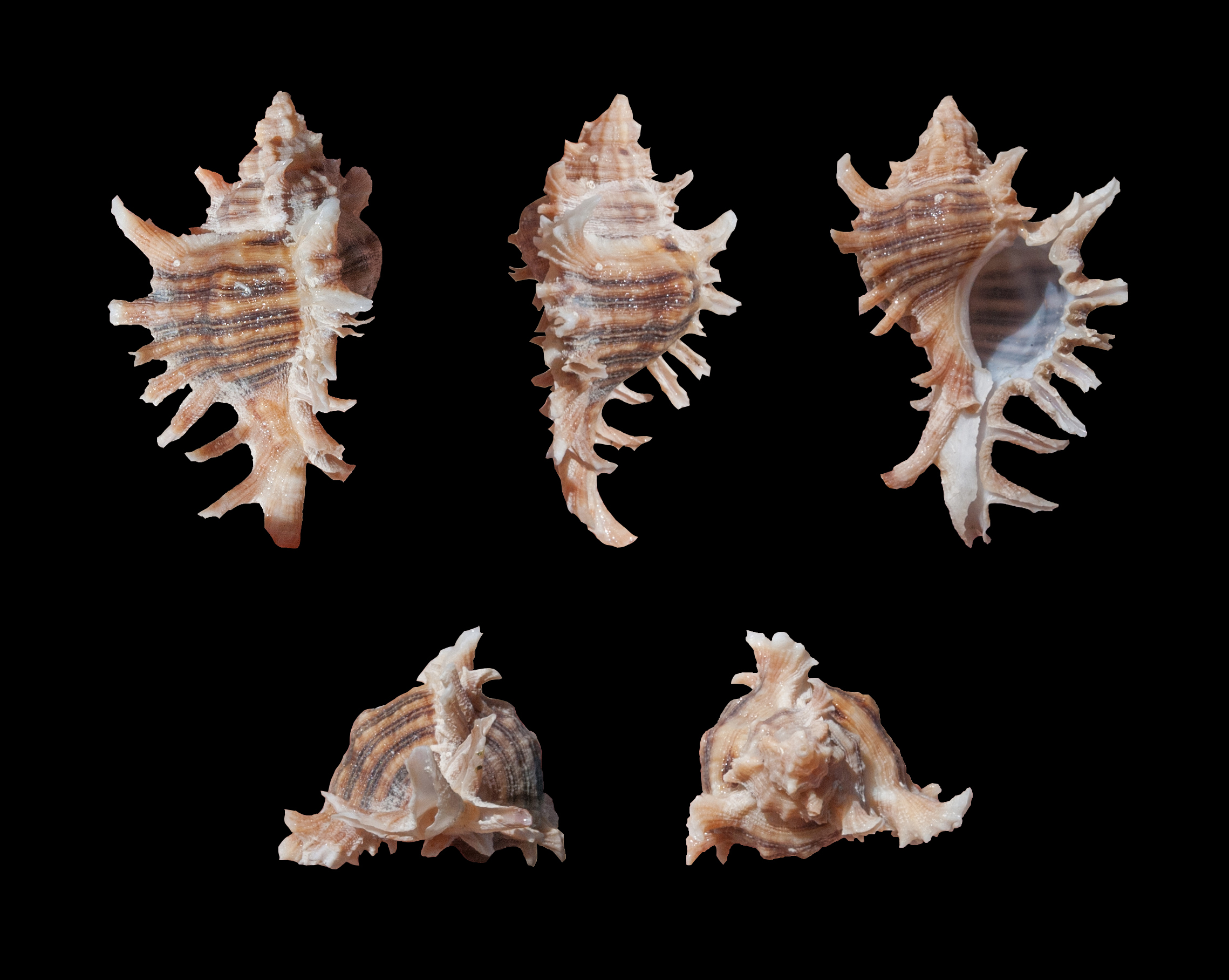
- A shell of Margarita Island, Chicoreus brevifrons
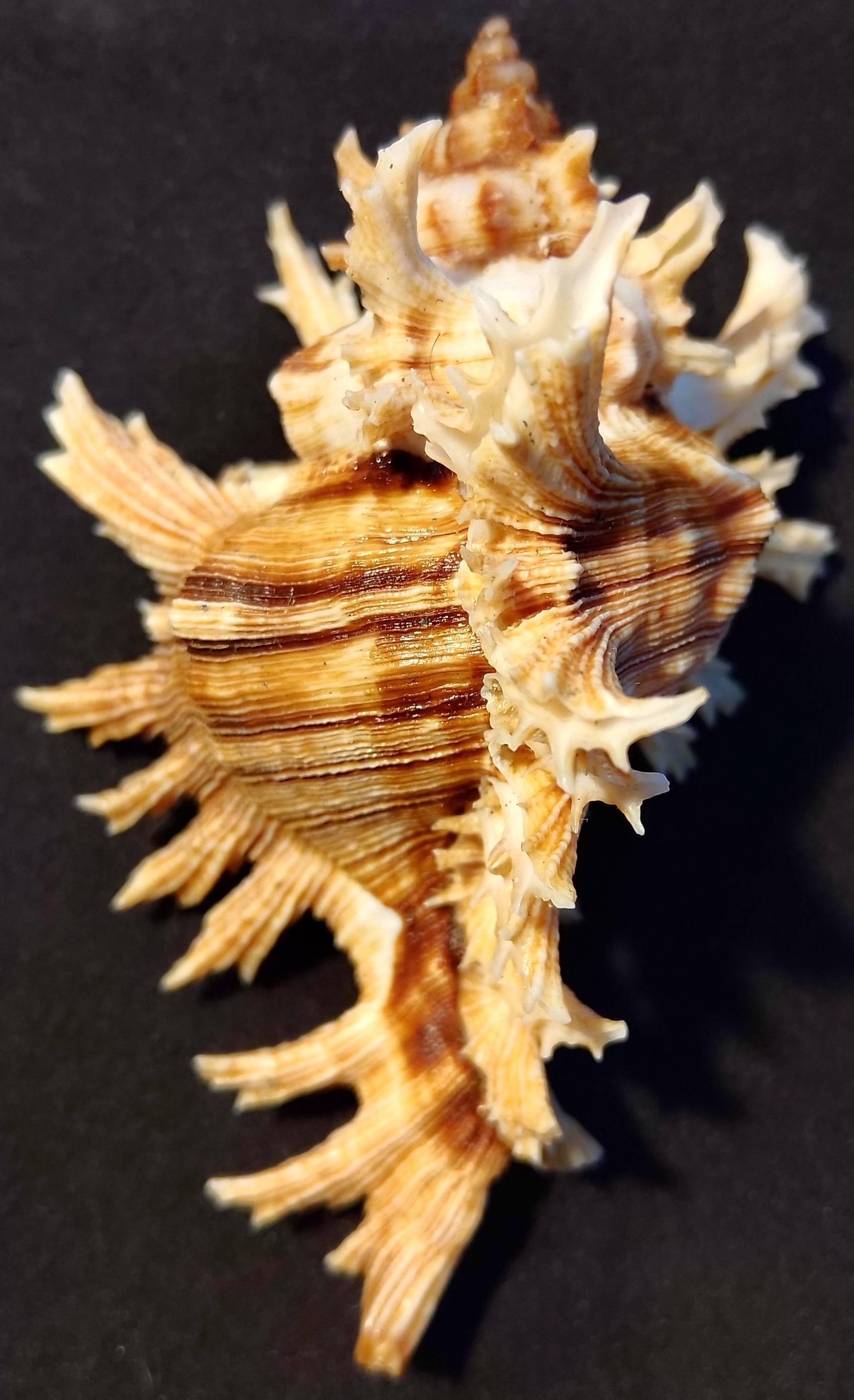

Scientific classification
- Kingdom: Animalia
- Phylum: Mollusca
- Class: Gastropoda
- Subclass: Caenogastropoda
- Order: Neogastropoda
- Family: Muricidae
- Genus: Chicoreus
- Species: C. brevifrons

Binomial name
- Chicoreus brevifrons (Lamarck, 1822)

Synonyms
- Chicoreus (Chicoreus) vokesae Macsotay & Campos, 2001; Chicoreus (Triplex) brevifrons (Lamarck, 1822); Murex approximatus Sowerby, 1879; Murex brevifrons Lamarck, 1822; Murex crassivaricosa Reeve, 1845; Murex elongatus Lamarck, 1822; Murex pudoricolor Reeve, 1845; Murex purpuratus Reeve, 1846; Murex spectrum var. incertum Usticke, 1969; Murex toupiollei Bernardi, 1860

= Chicoreus brevifrons =

West indian murex

Species of gastropod

Chicoreus brevifrons, common name the West Indian murex, is a species of predatory sea snail, a marine gastropod mollusk in the family Muricidae, the murex snails.

== Shell description ==
The maximum shell length of this species is up to 150 mm.

The shell of C. brevifrons is relatively elongate, and has a typical muricid outline. Three axial varices are present along its body whorl, and they are ornamented by characteristic expanded hollow spines. It also presents flat spiral cords in the interspaces of its surface. The anterior canal is well-developed, akin to several other Muricidae snails.

== Distribution ==
C. brevifrons occurs in the Western Central Atlantic, from the Caribbean, the Gulf of Mexico, the Antilles to Brazil.

== Ecology ==
=== Habitat ===
This sea snail dwells on mud flats in protected bays and lagoons. It is commonly found near oyster banks, as well as mangrove areas.

=== Feeding ===
C. brevifrons is an active predator of other molluscs such as oysters and clams.

== Human uses ==
This sea snail is locally collected for food, and is consumed raw or boiled. The shell is often sold as a souvenir in local markets.
