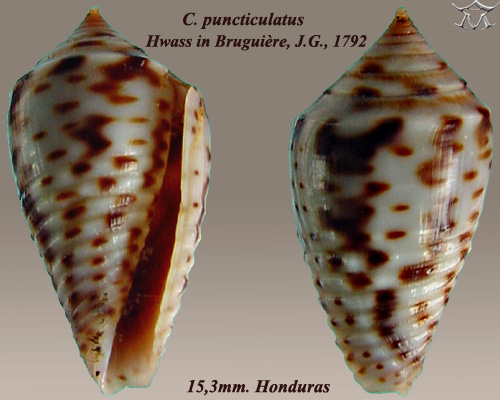
- Apertural and abapertural views of shell of Conasprella puncticulatus Hwass in Bruguière, J.G., 1792
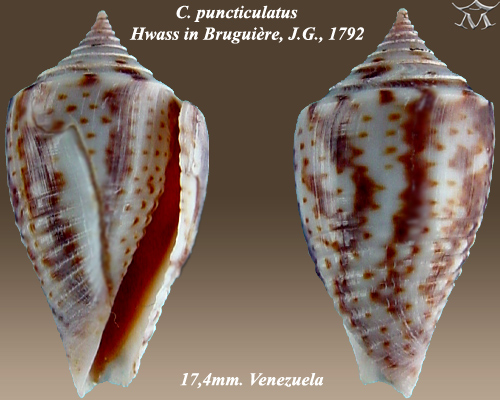

Conservation status
- Least Concern (IUCN 3.1)

Scientific classification
- Kingdom: Animalia
- Phylum: Mollusca
- Class: Gastropoda
- Subclass: Caenogastropoda
- Order: Neogastropoda
- Superfamily: Conoidea
- Family: Conidae
- Genus: Conasprella
- Species: C. puncticulata

Binomial name
- Conasprella puncticulata (Hwass in Bruguière, 1792)

Synonyms
- Conasprella (Ximeniconus) puncticulata (Hwass in Bruguière, 1792) · accepted, alternate representation; Conus echinulatus Kiener, 1848; Conus mauritianus Hwass in Bruguière, 1792; Conus papillosus Kiener, 1845; Conus puncticulatus Hwass in Bruguière, 1792 (original combination); Conus puncticulatus var. cardonensis Vink, 1990; Conus pustulatus Kiener, 1845 (nomen dubium); Conus pygmaeus Reeve, 1844; Conus scaber Link, 1807; Cucullus millepunctatus Röding, 1798; Cucullus minutus Röding, 1798; Perplexiconus puncticulatus (Hwass in Bruguière, 1792)

= Conasprella puncticulata =

Species of gastropod

Conasprella puncticulata is a species of sea snail, a marine gastropod mollusk in the family Conidae, the cone snails and their allies.

Like all species within the family Conidae, these snails are predatory and venomous. They are capable of stinging humans, therefore live ones should be handled carefully or not at all.

== Subspecies ==
- Conasprella puncticulata columba (Hwass in Bruguière, 1792) (synonym: Conus columba Hwass in Bruguière, 1792
- Conasprella puncticulata puncticulata (Hwass in Bruguière, 1792)

== Distribution ==
This species occurs in the Caribbean Sea and off the Lesser Antilles.

== Description ==
The maximum recorded shell length is 32 mm. The shell is rather broad-shouldered and somewhat swollen above, slightly contracted and grooved towards the base. Its color is whitish, encircled by numerous lines of close, small chestnut spots, and often clouded longitudinally with light violaceous or chestnut, forming three obscure bands. The aperture is white or violaceous.

== Habitat ==
Minimum recorded depth is 0 m. Maximum recorded depth is 15 m.
