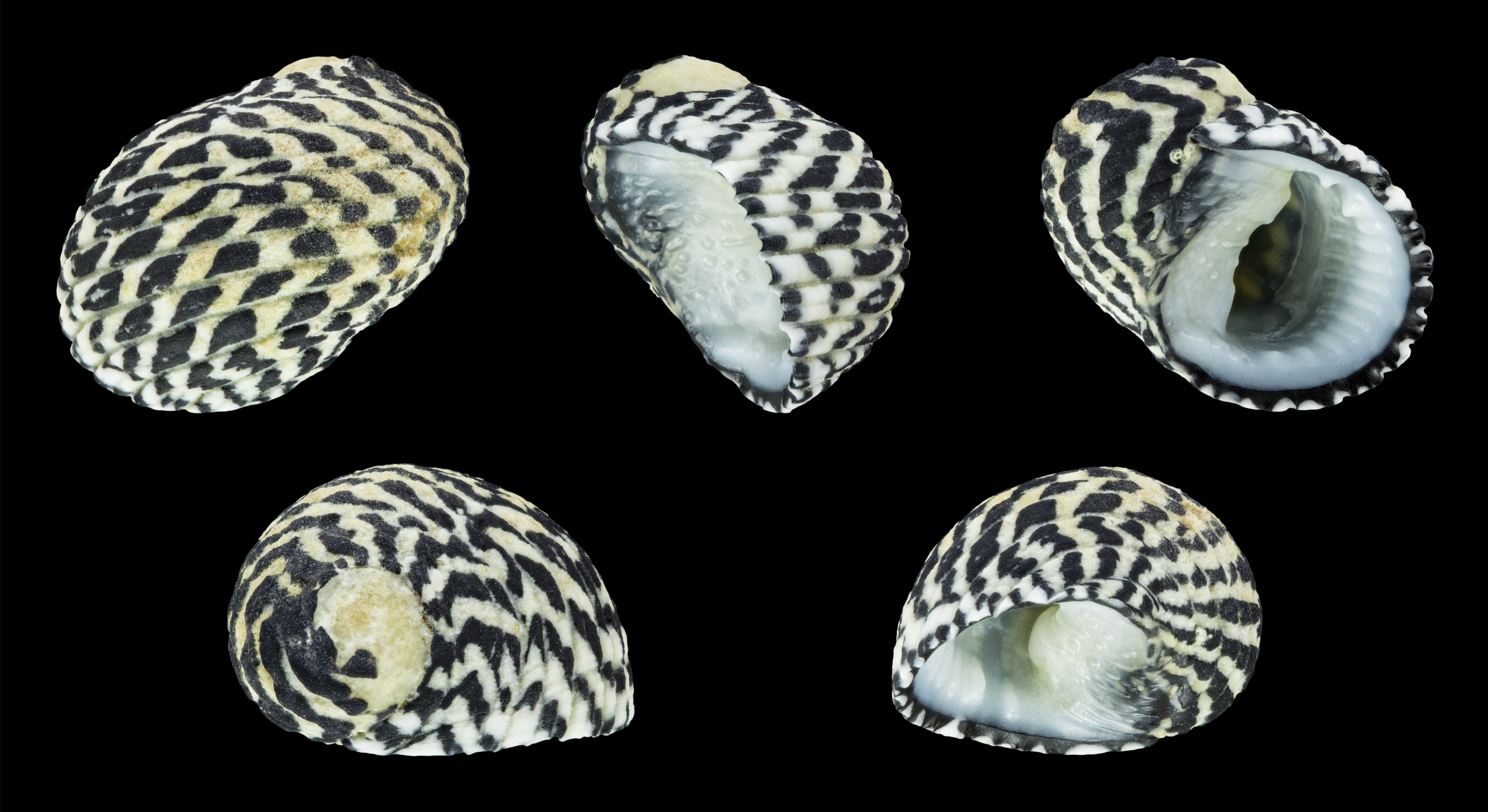

Scientific classification
- Kingdom: Animalia
- Phylum: Mollusca
- Class: Gastropoda
- Order: Cycloneritida
- Family: Neritidae
- Genus: Nerita
- Species: N. tessellata

Binomial name
- Nerita tessellata Gmelin, 1791

Synonyms
- Nerita angulata Röding, 1798; Nerita exarata Pfeiffer, 1840; Nerita listeri auct. non Récluz, 1841; Nerita varia Mörch, 1852; Nerita commanotata Reeve, 1855; Nerita nivosa Reeve, 1855; Nerita scalpta Reeve, 1855

= Nerita tessellata =

Species of gastropod

Nerita tessellata, sometimes known as the checkered nerite, is a species of tropical sea snail with a gill and an operculum, a nerite, a marine gastropod mollusk in the family Neritidae, the nerites.

== Distribution ==
This nerite occurs on the shores of the Western Atlantic Ocean including Florida, Puerto Rico, Mexico, Belize, Honduras, Costa Rica, Panama, Colombia, Venezuela, Dominican Republic, the West Indies and Brazil.

== Habitat ==
This species lives high up in the intertidal zone on rocks.

== Description ==
The shell of this nerite can be as large as 25 mm. The background shell color is black, usually with white markings. Fairly often the white markings are regularly spaced, and make the shell look checkered or tesselated (tiled), hence the specific name of this species.
