= Siphonodentallidae =

Siphonodentallidae Temporal range: Late Permian – Recent

Scientific classification
- Kingdom: Animalia
- Phylum: Mollusca
- Class: Scaphopoda
- Order: Gadilida
- Suborder: Gadilimorpha
- Family: Siphonodentallidae

Family of molluscs

Siphonodentallidae is a family of scaphopods typified by Siphonodentalium and including fossil forms.
