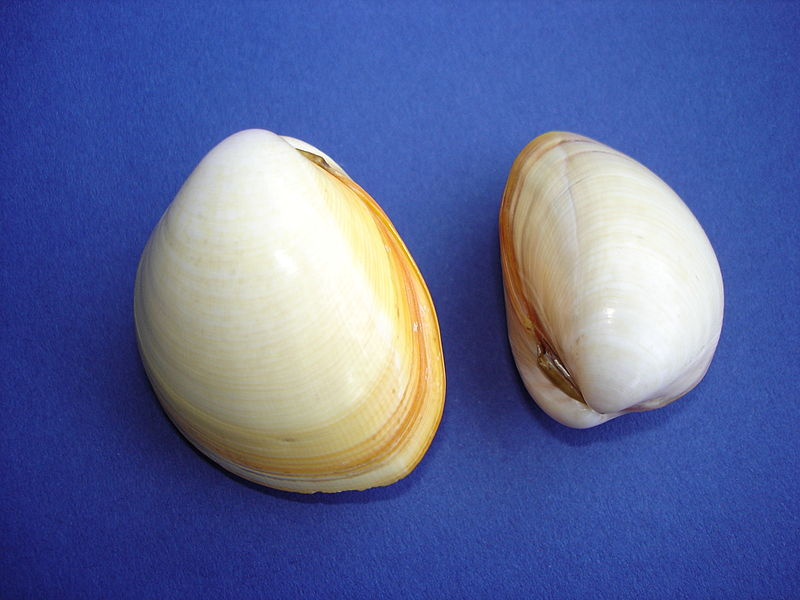
- Laevicardium laevigatum

Scientific classification
- Kingdom: Animalia
- Phylum: Mollusca
- Class: Bivalvia
- Order: Cardiida
- Family: Cardiidae
- Genus: Laevicardium
- Species: L. laevigatum

Binomial name
- Laevicardium laevigatum (Linnaeus, 1758)

= Laevicardium laevigatum =

Species of bivalve

Laevicardium laevigatum, or the egg cockle, is a species of bivalve mollusc in the family Cardiidae. It can be found along the Atlantic coast of North America, ranging from North Carolina to the West Indies.
