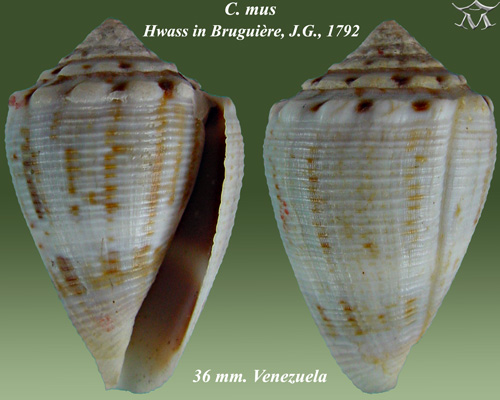
- Apertural and abapertural views of shell of Conus mus Hwass in Bruguière, J.G., 1792
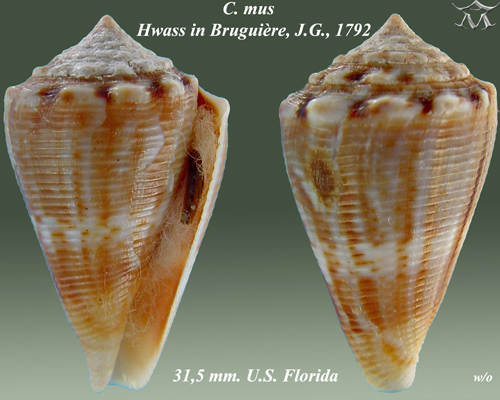

Conservation status
- Least Concern (IUCN 3.1)

Scientific classification
- Kingdom: Animalia
- Phylum: Mollusca
- Class: Gastropoda
- Subclass: Caenogastropoda
- Order: Neogastropoda
- Superfamily: Conoidea
- Family: Conidae
- Genus: Conus
- Species: C. mus

Binomial name
- Conus mus Hwass in Bruguière, 1792

Synonyms
- Conus (Monteiroconus) mus Hwass in Bruguière, 1792 · accepted, alternate representation; Conus barbadensis auct. non Hwass, 1792 (misidentification by Hwass (1792) ); Conus citrinus auct. non Gmelin, 1791 (misidentification by Clench (1942, 1953) ); Gladioconus mus (Hwass in Bruguière, 1792); Leptoconus mus (Hwass, 1792); Atlanticonus cuna Petuch (1998)

= Conus mus =

Species of sea snail

Conus mus, common name the mouse cone, is a species of sea snail, a marine gastropod mollusk in the family Conidae, the cone snails and their allies.

Like all species within the genus Conus, these snails are predatory and venomous. They are capable of stinging humans, therefore live ones should be handled carefully or not at all.

== Distribution ==
This shallow-water species occurs in the Caribbean Sea and the Gulf of Mexico; in the Western Atlantic from North Carolina, USA and the Bermudas to Venezuela including the Eastern Caribbean island chain, and Barbados.

== Description ==
The maximum recorded shell length is 43.5 mm. The shell has a tuberculated spire. The body whorl is covered by narrow, raised revolving striae. Its color is ash-white, longitudinally streaked and maculated with chestnut. The tubercles of the spire are white, and there is usually a white band below the middle of the body whorl. The aperture is chestnut-colored, with a central white band. Rarely, giant specimens of 50–60 mm. are known, but these are far from normal.

== Habitat ==
Minimum recorded depth is 0 m. Maximum recorded depth is 18 m.

== Gallery ==
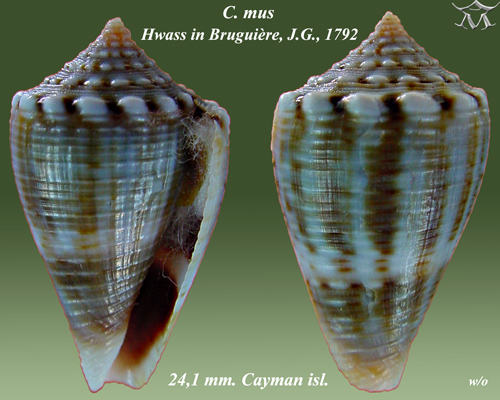
Conus mus Hwass in Bruguière, J.G., 1792

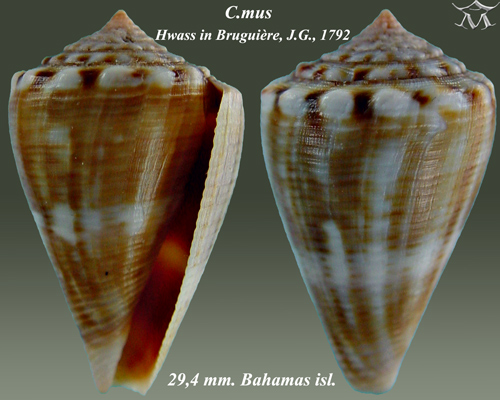
Conus mus Hwass in Bruguière, J.G., 1792

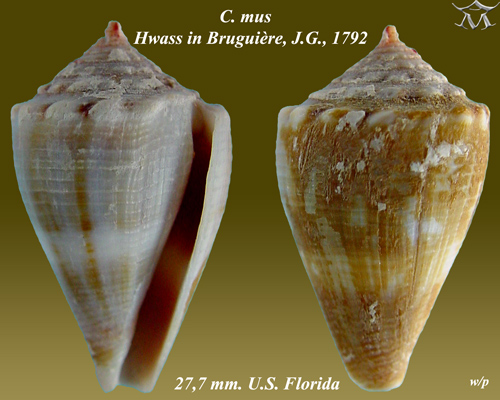
Conus mus Hwass in Bruguière, J.G., 1792

Beached Cone shells from East coast Barbados
