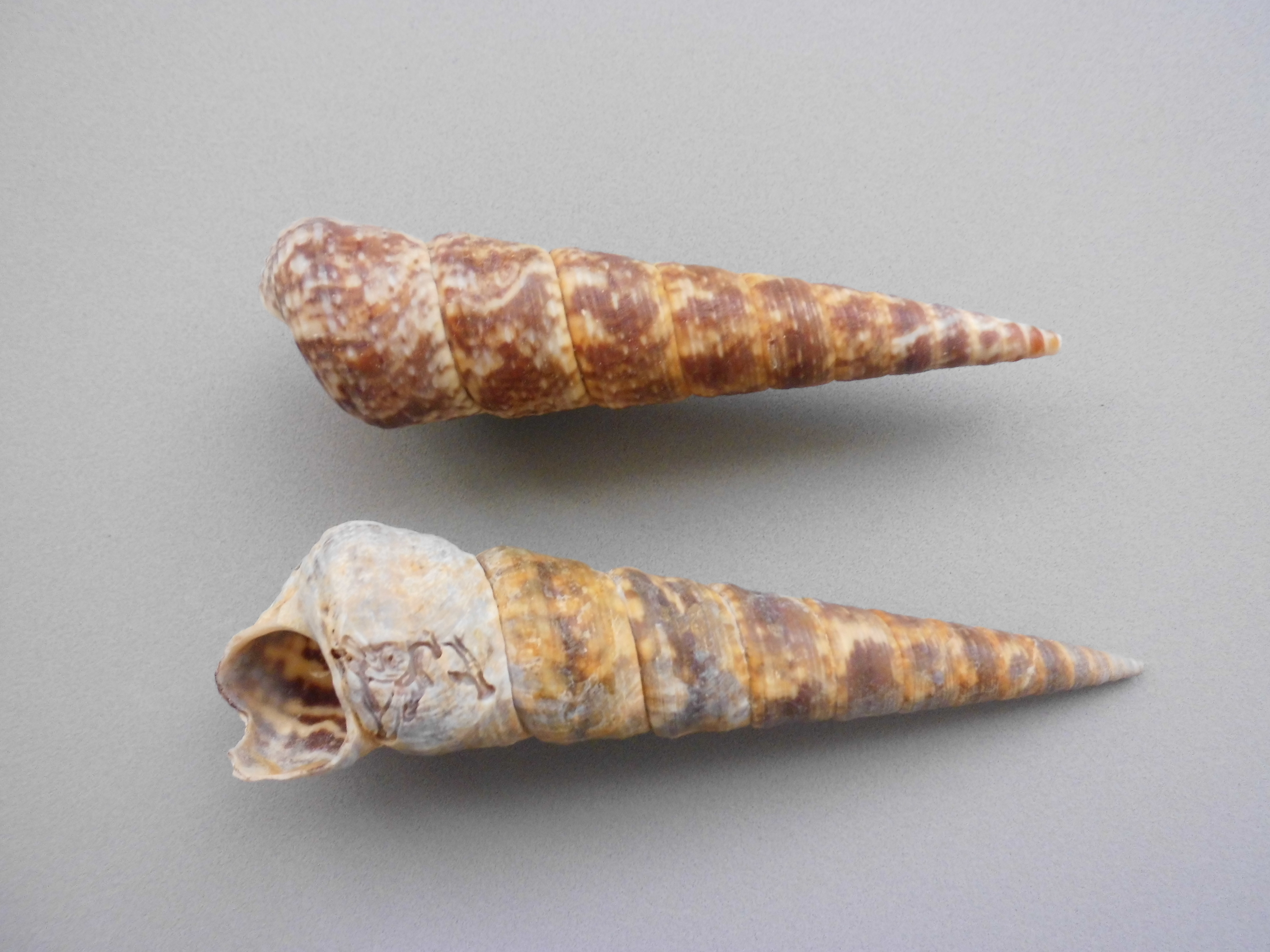

Scientific classification
- Kingdom: Animalia
- Phylum: Mollusca
- Class: Gastropoda
- Subclass: Caenogastropoda
- Order: incertae sedis
- Family: Turritellidae
- Genus: Turritella
- Species: T. variegata

Binomial name
- Turritella variegata (Linnaeus, 1758)

Synonyms
- Epitonium marmoreum Röding, 1798; Turbo variegatus Linnaeus, 1758; Turritella imbricata (Linnaeus, 1758); Turritella paraguanensis Hodson, 1926; Turritella variegata var. elongata Reeve, 1849

= Turritella variegata =

Species of gastropod

Turritella variegata is a species of sea snail, a marine gastropod mollusk in the family Turritellidae.

== Description ==
The maximum recorded shell length is 120 mm.

== Habitat ==
The minimum recorded depth for this species is 0 m; maximum recorded depth is 53 m.
