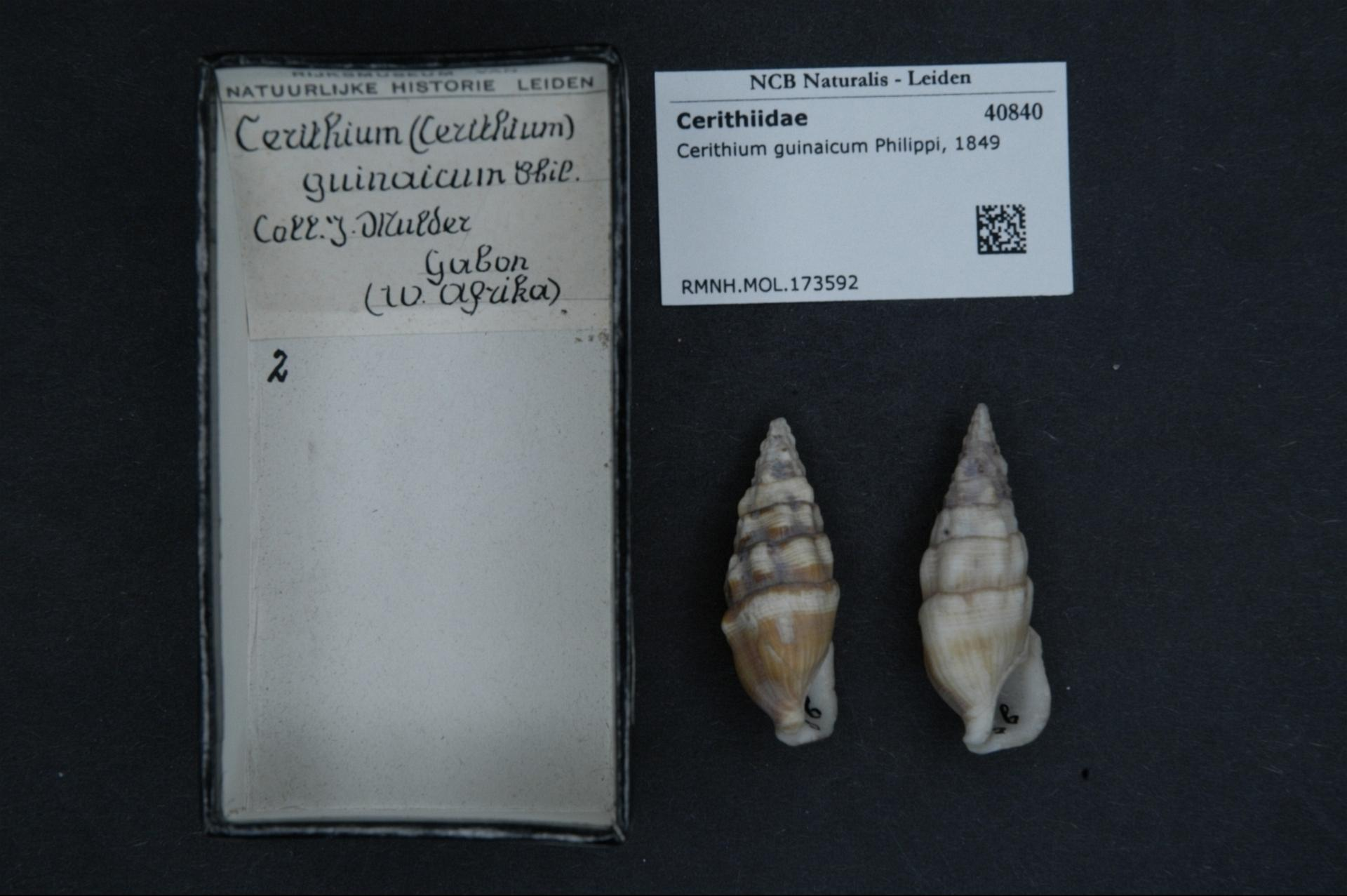
- Cerithium guinaicum

Scientific classification
- Kingdom: Animalia
- Phylum: Mollusca
- Class: Gastropoda
- Subclass: Caenogastropoda
- Order: incertae sedis
- Family: Cerithiidae
- Genus: Cerithium
- Species: C. guinaicum

Binomial name
- Cerithium guinaicum Philippi, 1849

Synonyms
- Cerithium auricoma Schwengel, 1940; Cerithium caribbaeum M. Smith, 1946; Cerithium mitriforme Cerithium moenense Gabb, 1881; Cerithium stantoni Dall, 1907; Murex pictus W. Wood, 1828; Thericium auricoma (Schwengel, 1940); Thericium moenense (Gabb, 1881); Thericium stantoni (Dall, 1907)

= Cerithium guinaicum =

Species of gastropod

Cerithium guinaicum is a species of sea snail, a marine gastropod mollusk in the family Cerithiidae.

== Distribution ==
The distribution of Cerithium guinaicum includes the North America.

== Description ==
The maximum recorded shell length is 45 millimetres (1.8 in).

== Habitat ==
Minimum recorded depth is 0 m. Maximum recorded depth is 20 metres (66 ft; 11 fathoms).
