= Calliostoma sarcodum =

Scientific classification
- Kingdom: Animalia
- Phylum: Mollusca
- Class: Gastropoda
- Subclass: Vetigastropoda
- Order: Trochida
- Family: Calliostomatidae
- Genus: Calliostoma
- Species: C. sarcodum

Binomial name
- Calliostoma sarcodum Dall, 1927

Synonyms
- Calliostoma jaumei Clench & Aguayo, 1946

Species of gastropod

Calliostoma sarcodum is a species of sea snail, a marine gastropod mollusk in the family Calliostomatidae.

== Description ==
The size of the shell varies between 8 mm and 16 mm.

== Distribution ==
This species occurs in the Caribbean Sea, the Gulf of Mexico and off the Lesser Antilles at depths between 6 m and 12 m.
