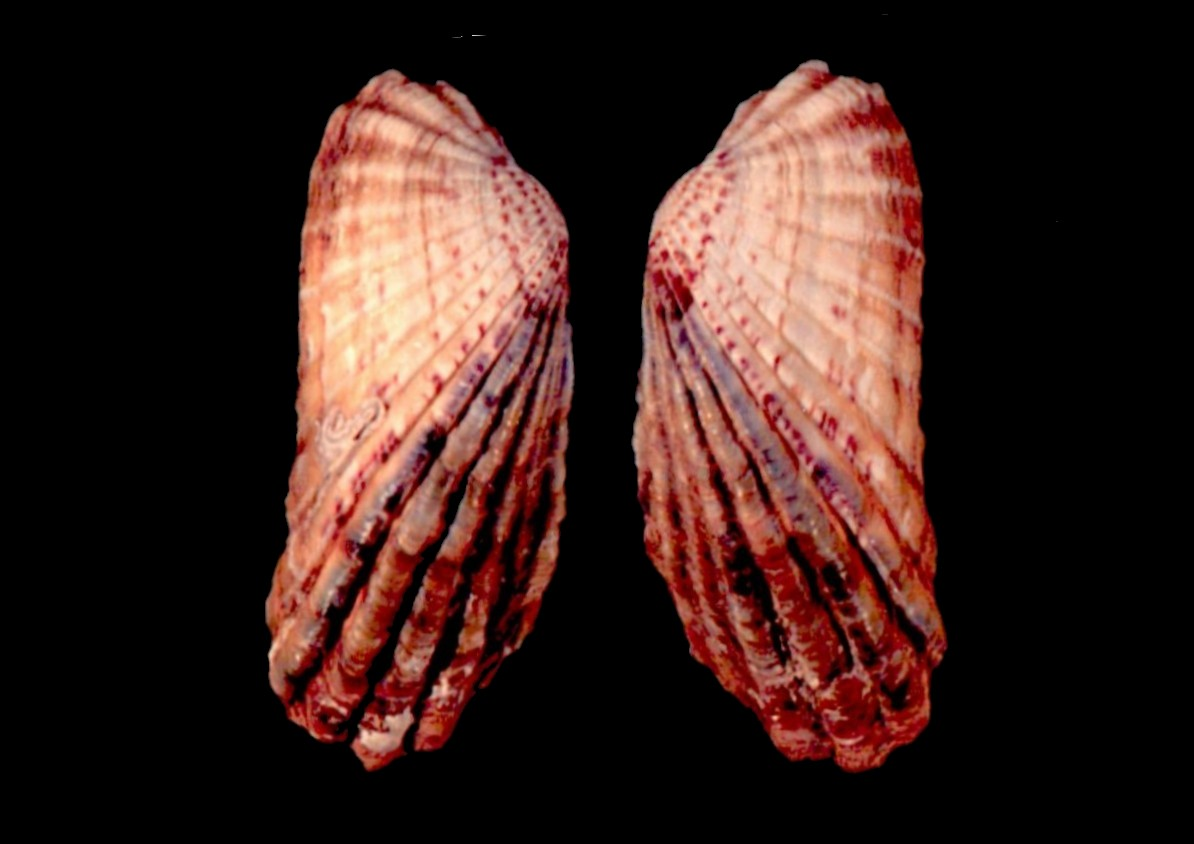

Scientific classification
- Kingdom: Animalia
- Phylum: Mollusca
- Class: Bivalvia
- Order: Carditida
- Superfamily: Carditoidea
- Family: Carditidae
- Genus: Carditamera
- Species: C. gracilis

Binomial name
- Carditamera gracilis (Shuttleworth, 1856)

= Carditamera gracilis =

Species of bivalve

Carditamera gracilis, or the West Indian cardita, is a species of bivalve mollusc in the family Carditidae. It can be found off the coast of the West Indies.

== Description ==
Carditamera gracilis has an elongated shell, strong medium size about 40 mm. It has more pronounced radial rib and high in the back. Its color is white with brown spots; inside is pearly.

== Distribution ==
Carditamera gracilis is distributed through the Gulf of Mexico and the Caribbean Sea.

== Habitat ==
It usually inhabits shallow water, attached to rocky substrates.
