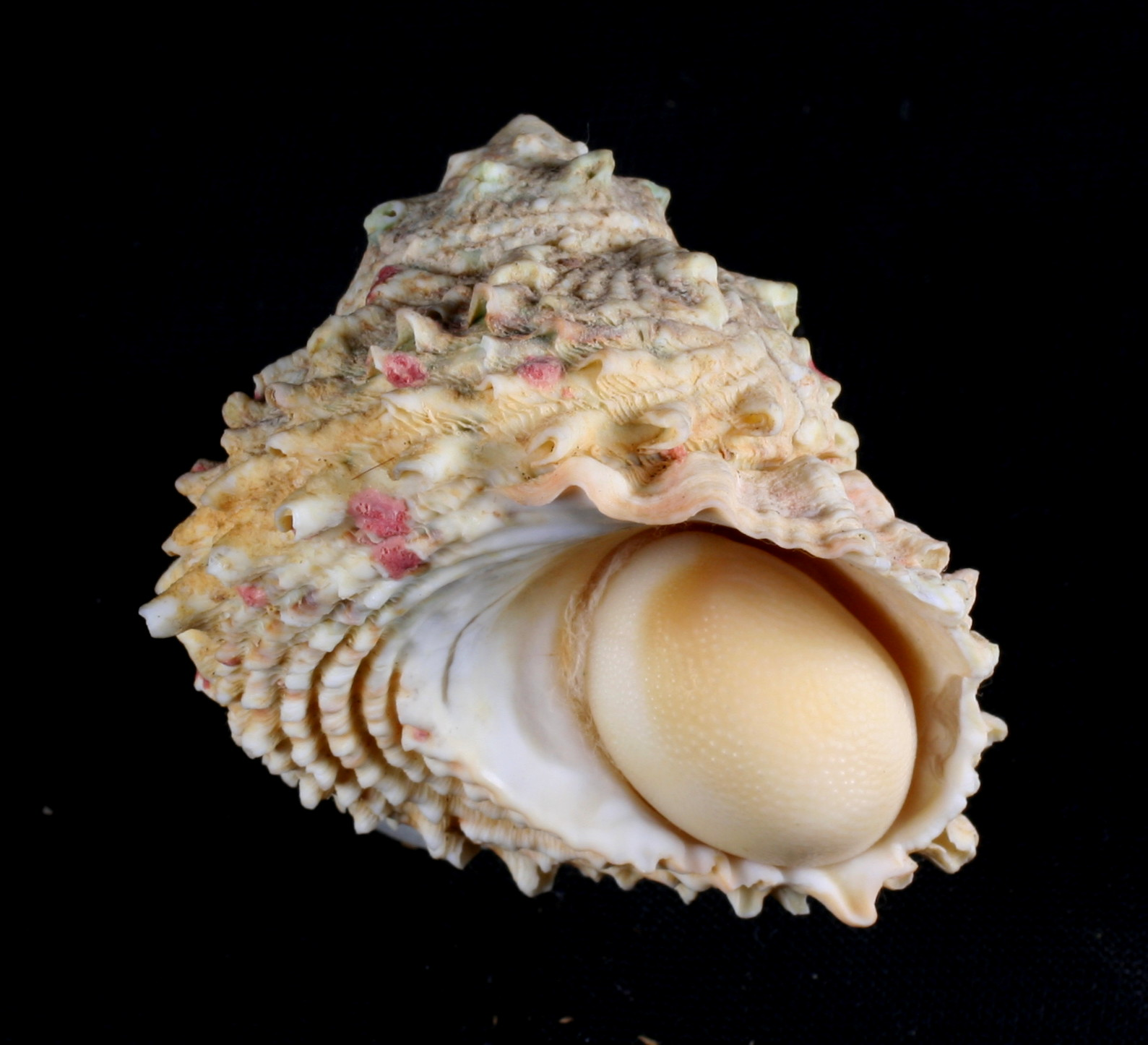
- Shell of Lithopoma caelatum (Gmelin, 1791), with operculum, measuring 51.9 mm in height by 51.2 mm diameter, found on reefs off Fajardo, in Puerto Rico.

Scientific classification
- Kingdom: Animalia
- Phylum: Mollusca
- Class: Gastropoda
- Subclass: Vetigastropoda
- Order: Trochida
- Family: Turbinidae
- Genus: Lithopoma
- Species: L. caelatum

Binomial name
- Lithopoma caelatum (Gmelin, 1791)

Synonyms
- Astraea caelatum (Gmelin, 1791); Astralium caelatum (Gmelin, 1791); Imperator caelatum (Gmelin, 1791); Pachypoma caelatum (Gmelin, 1791); Trochus caelatus Gmelin, 1791 (basionym)

= Lithopoma caelatum =

Species of gastropod

Lithopoma caelatum, common name the carved star shell, is a species of sea snail, a marine gastropod mollusk in the family Turbinidae, the turban snails.

== Distribution ==
This species occurs in the Gulf of Mexico, the Caribbean Sea and the Lesser Antilles; in the Atlantic Ocean off the Bahamas.

== Description ==
The maximum recorded shell length is 100 mm.

The solid, imperforate shell has a conic shape. Its color pattern is soiled white, more or less tinged with green and brown. The elevated spire has an acute apex. The 6-7 whorls are convex, with fine incremental striae and oblique radiating folds above. The periphery shows several prominent squamose or spinose lirae. The base of the shell is somewhat flattened, with close squamose lirae separated by deep interstices. The aperture is silvery within, transversely ovate, very oblique, its margins fluted. The columella is extended, oblique, and arcuate.

The operculum is oval, with a submarginal nucleus. The outside is convex, white or brown tinted, and coarsely granulose.

== Habitat ==
The minimum recorded depth for this species is 0 m; maximum recorded depth is 44 m.
