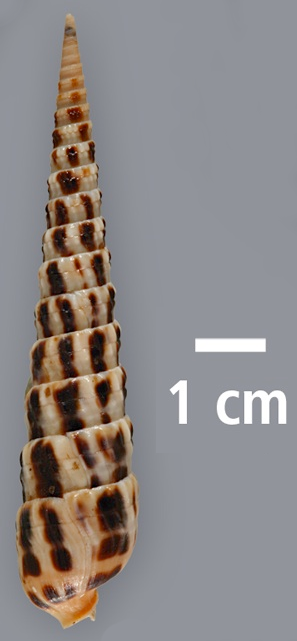
- Shell of Terebra taurina

Scientific classification
- Kingdom: Animalia
- Phylum: Mollusca
- Class: Gastropoda
- Subclass: Caenogastropoda
- Order: Neogastropoda
- Family: Terebridae
- Genus: Terebra
- Species: T. taurina

Binomial name
- Terebra taurina (Lightfoot, 1786)

Synonyms
- Buccinum taurinum Lightfoot, 1786; Epitonium feldmanni Röding, 1798; Terebra taurinum (Lightfoot, 1786); Terebra taurinus (Lightfoot, 1786); Terebra flammea Lamarck, 1822; Terebra texana Dall, 1898; Terebra undata Fischer von Waldheim, 1807

= Terebra taurina =

Species of gastropod

Terebra taurina is a species of sea snail, a marine gastropod mollusc in the family Terebridae, the auger snails.

== Description ==
The length of the shell attains 152.5 mm.

== Distribution ==
This species occurs in the Gulf of Mexico and in the Caribbean Sea.
