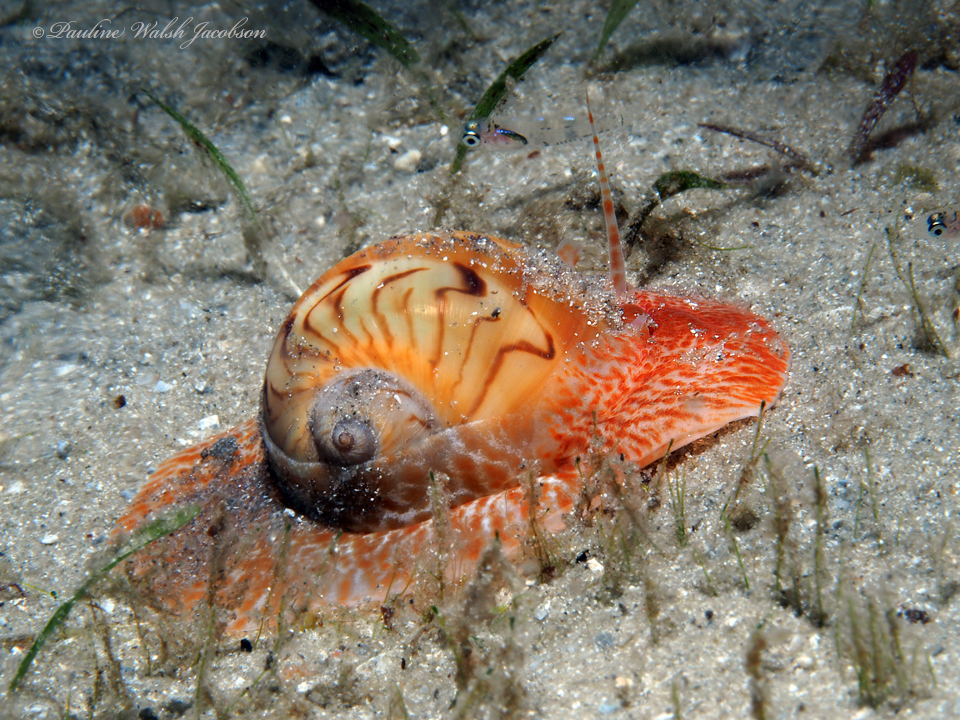

Scientific classification
- Kingdom: Animalia
- Phylum: Mollusca
- Class: Gastropoda
- Subclass: Caenogastropoda
- Order: Littorinimorpha
- Family: Naticidae
- Genus: Naticarius
- Species: N. canrena

Binomial name
- Naticarius canrena (Linnaeus, 1758)

= Naticarius canrena =

Species of gastropod

Naticarius canrena is a species of predatory sea snail, a marine gastropod mollusk in the family Naticidae, the moon snails.

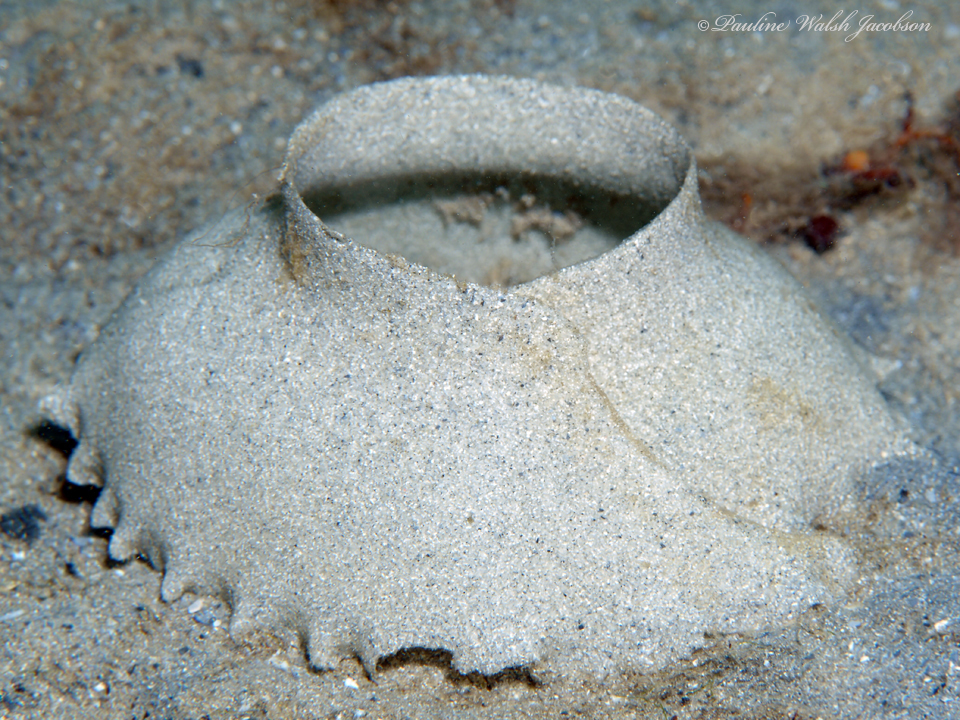
N. canrena sand collar.

== Description ==
The maximum recorded shell length is 65 mm.

== Habitat ==
Minimum recorded depth is 0 m. Maximum recorded depth is 101 m.
A living adult specimen was trapped off West coast BARBADOS at around 400 ft. depth.

Shell
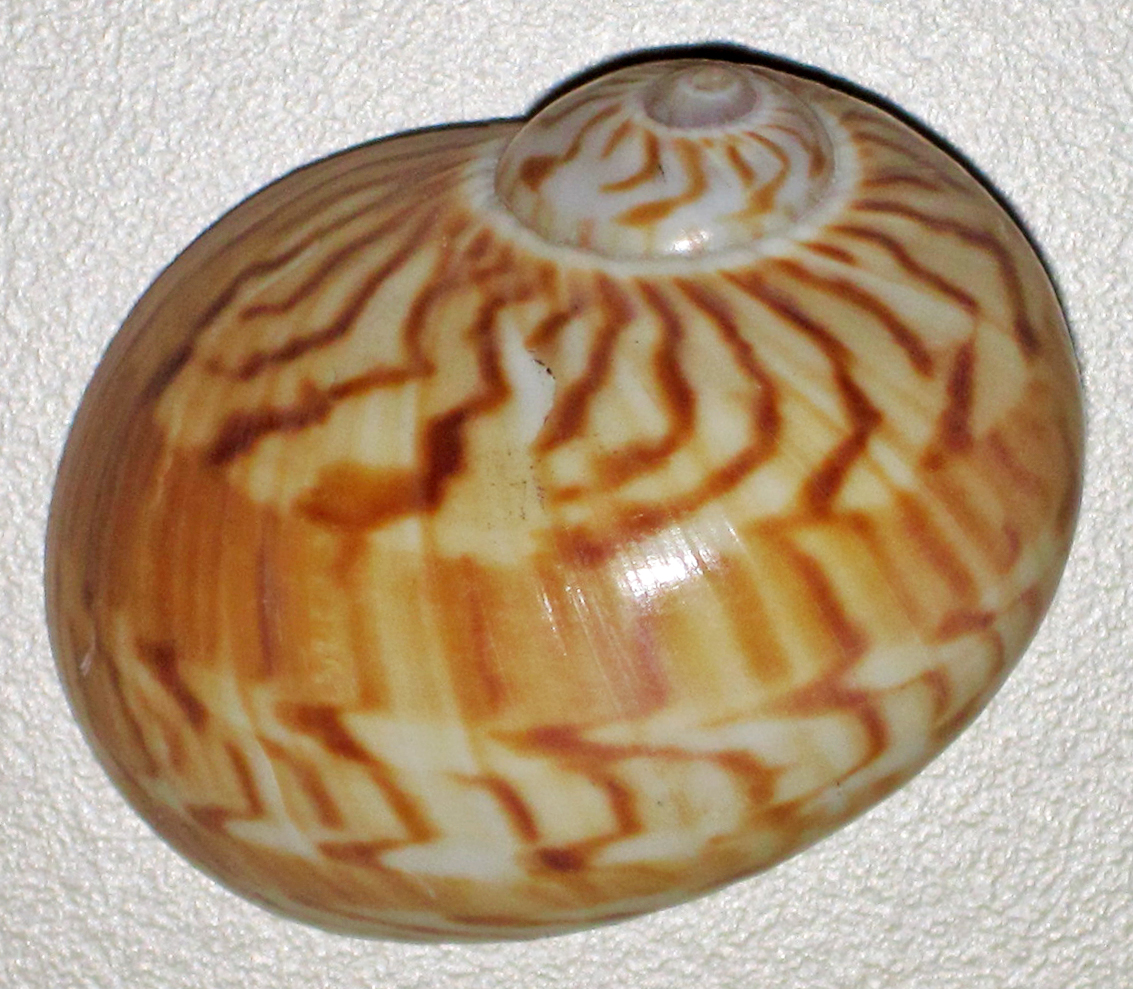
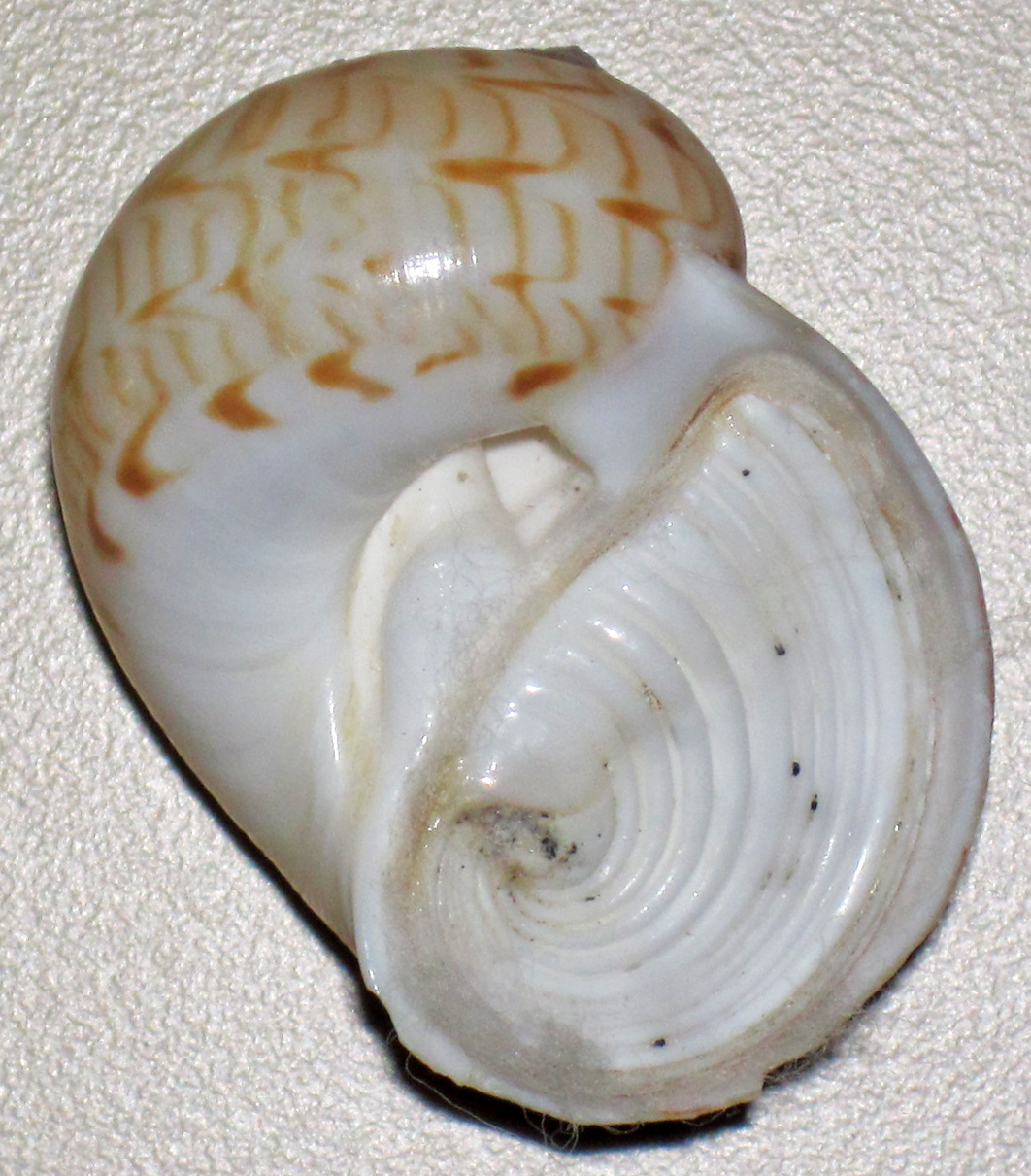
