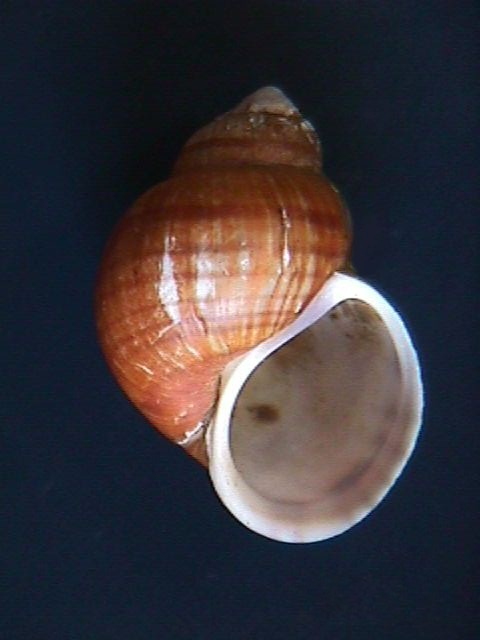
- Apertural view of a shell of Pomacea superba

Scientific classification
- Kingdom: Animalia
- Phylum: Mollusca
- Class: Gastropoda
- Subclass: Caenogastropoda
- Order: Architaenioglossa
- Family: Ampullariidae
- Genus: Pomacea
- Species: P. superba

Binomial name
- Pomacea superba (Marshall, 1926)

Synonyms
- Ampullaria superba Marshall, 1926; Ampullarius (Ampullarius) superbus (Marshall, 1926)

= Pomacea superba =

Species of gastropod

Pomacea superba is a species of freshwater snail in the family Ampullariidae. It is known from Colombia and Venezuela.
