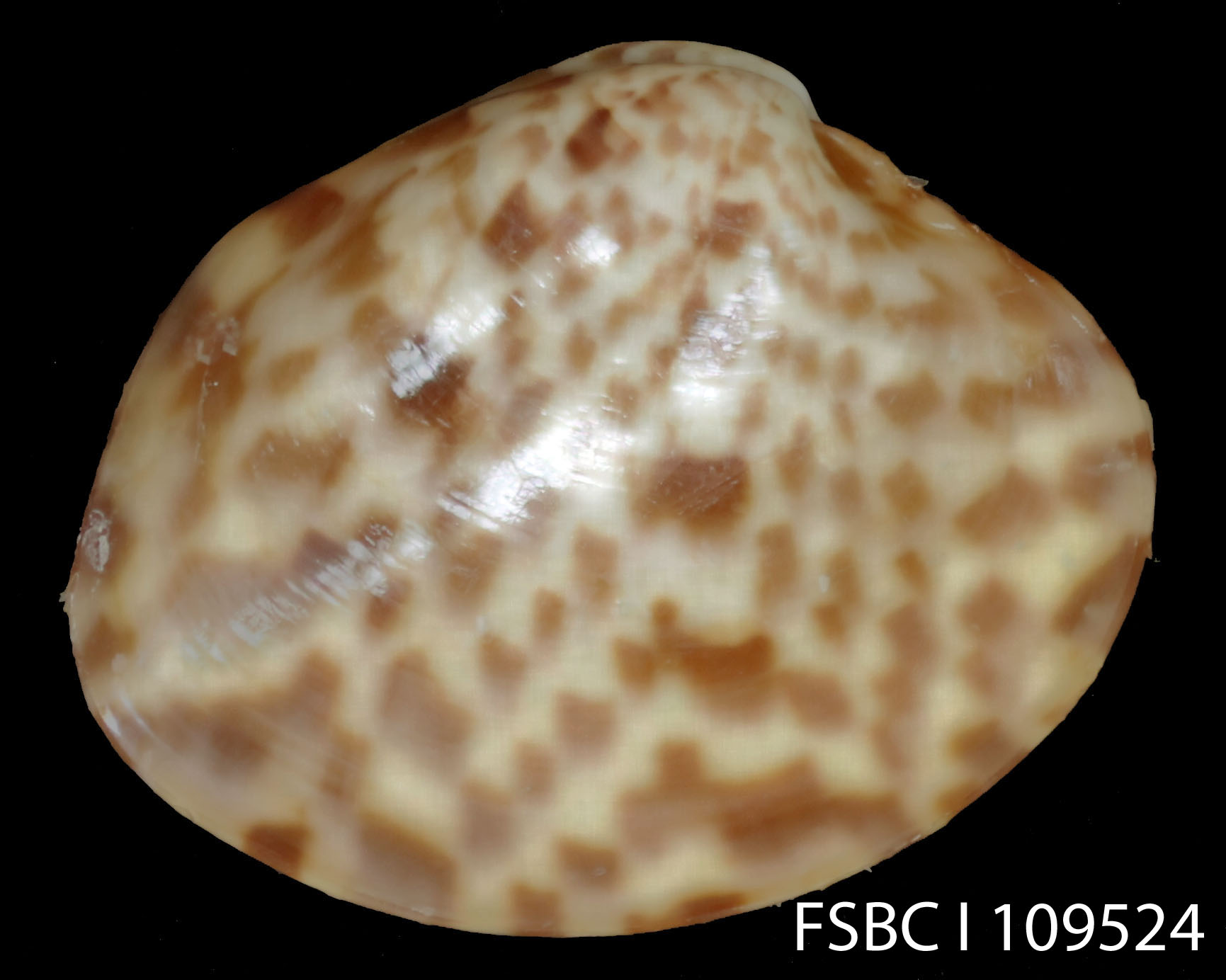

Scientific classification
- Kingdom: Animalia
- Phylum: Mollusca
- Class: Bivalvia
- Order: Venerida
- Superfamily: Veneroidea
- Family: Veneridae
- Genus: Macrocallista
- Species: M. maculata

Binomial name
- Macrocallista maculata (Linnaeus, 1758)

= Macrocallista maculata =

Species of bivalve

Macrocallista maculata, or the calico clam, is a species of bivalve mollusc in the family Veneridae. It can be found along the Atlantic coast of North America, ranging from North Carolina to Bermuda and Brazil.

Right and left valve of the same specimen:

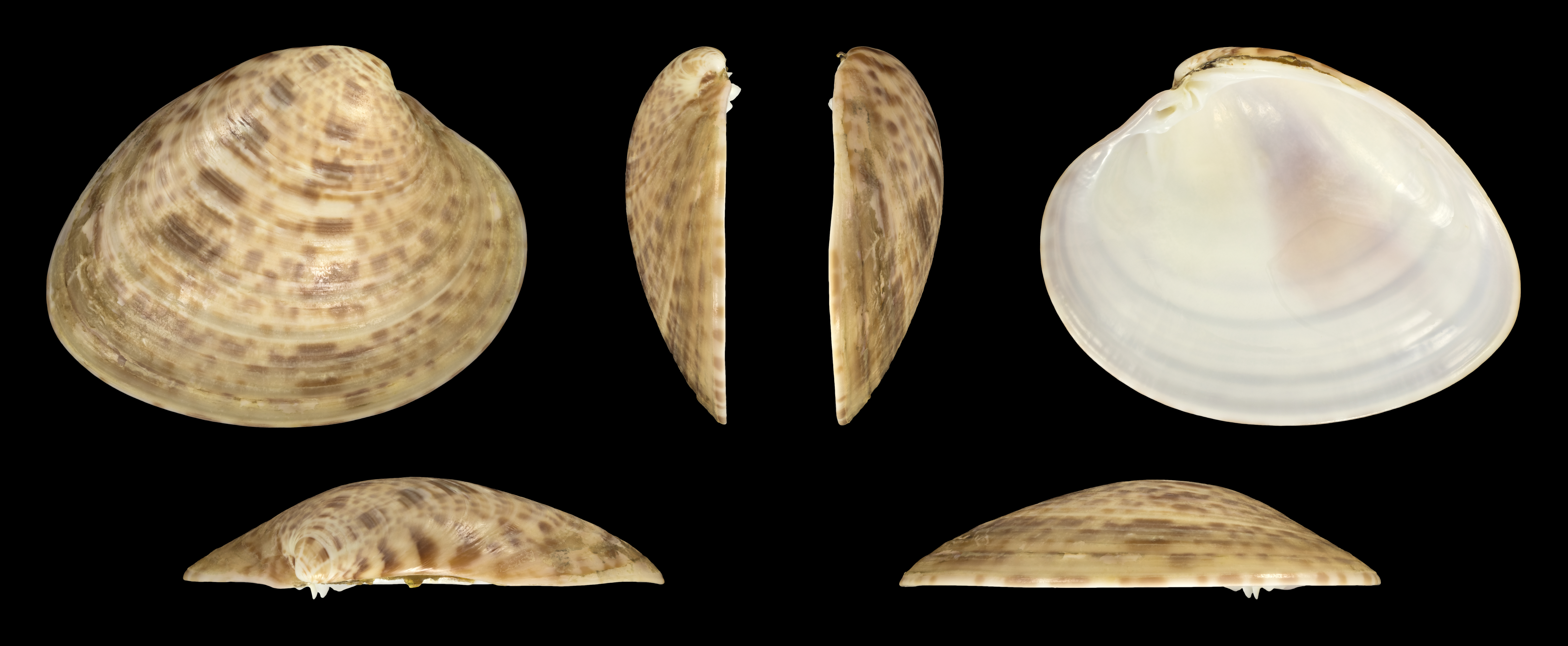
Right valve

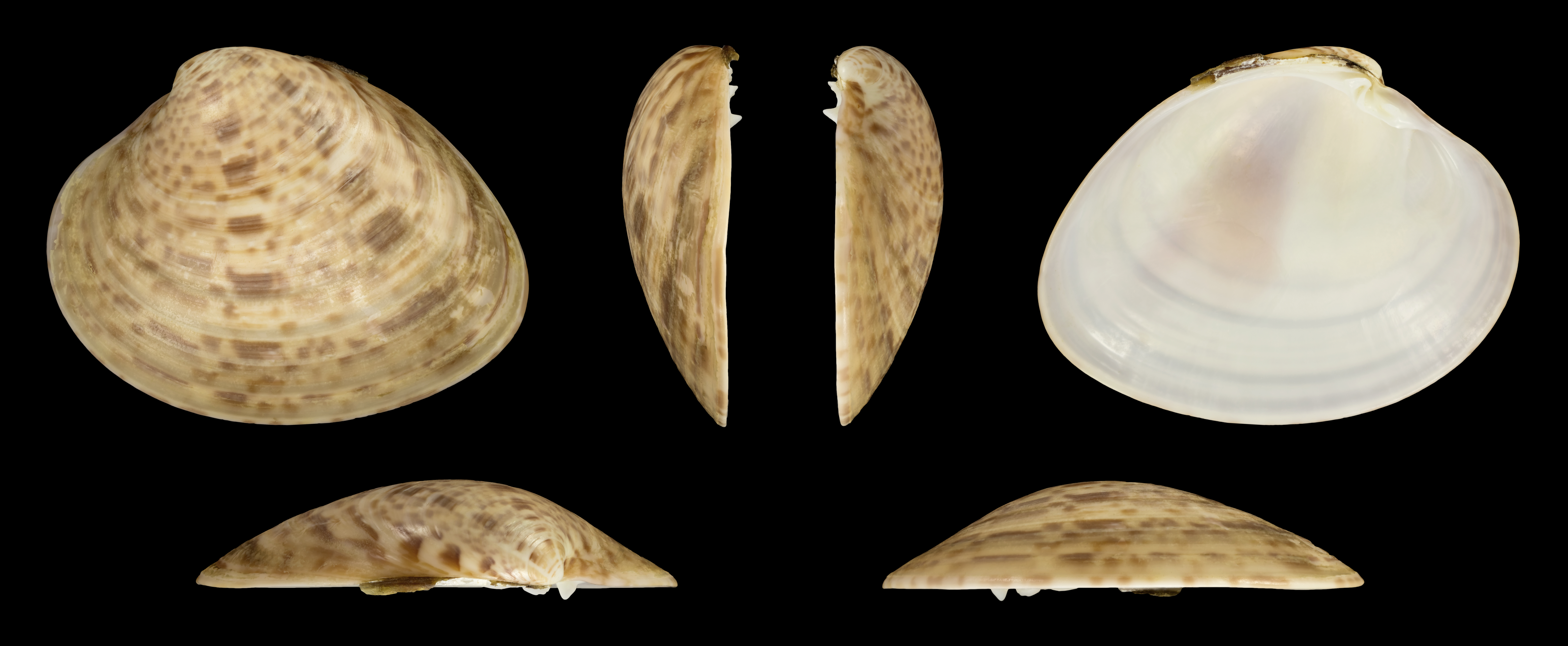
Left valve

Fossil, juvenile

Right valve

Left valve

The calico clam has been protected from harvesting in Bermuda since the 1970s (see Fisheries Protected Species Order 1978).
