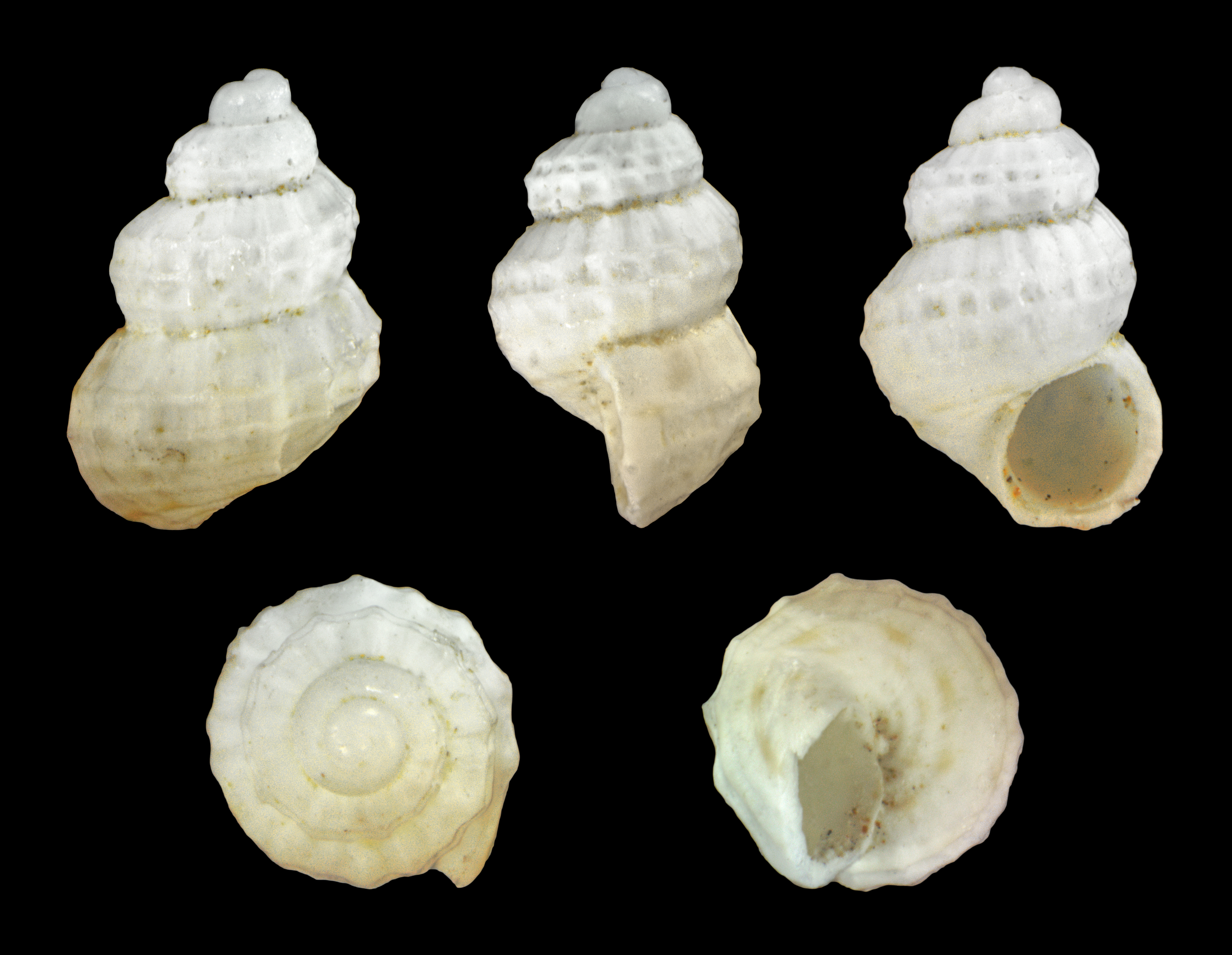

Scientific classification
- Kingdom: Animalia
- Phylum: Mollusca
- Class: Gastropoda
- Subclass: Caenogastropoda
- Order: Littorinimorpha
- Superfamily: Rissooidea
- Family: Rissoidae
- Genus: Alvania
- Species: A. auberiana

Binomial name
- Alvania auberiana (d'Orbigny, 1842)

Synonyms
- Rissoa auberiana d'Orbigny, 1842

= Alvania auberiana =

Species of gastropod

Alvania auberiana, common name the West Indian alvania, is a species of small sea snail, a marine gastropod mollusk or micromollusk in the family Rissoidae.

== Distribution ==
This marine species occurs off North Carolina, USA, Bermuda, Curaçao and Colombia to Eastern Brazil.

== Description ==
The maximum recorded shell length is 2.1 mm.

The imperforate shell is thin. It is white, with brownish maculations. It shows numerous, thin, longitudinal and spiral ribs. The shell contains six convex whorls with a sloping shoulder defined by an angle. The outer lip is thickened.

== Habitat ==
Minimum recorded depth is 0 m. Maximum recorded depth is 101 m.
