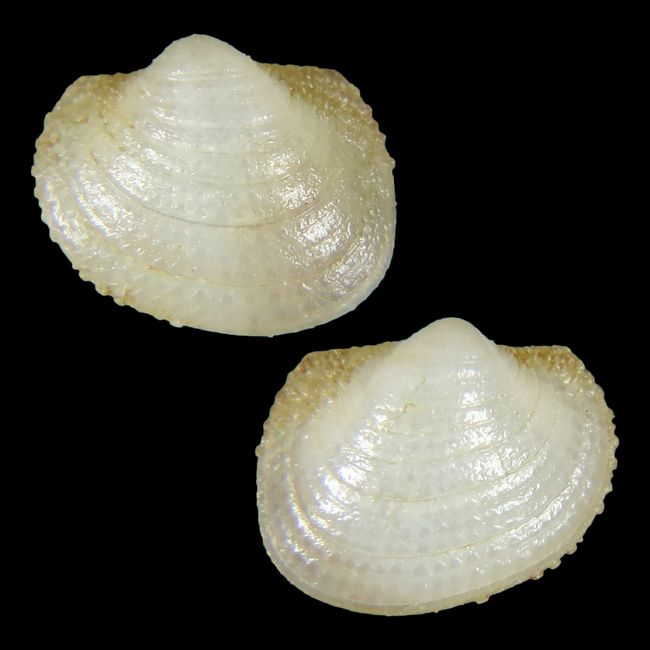

Scientific classification
- Kingdom: Animalia
- Phylum: Mollusca
- Class: Bivalvia
- Order: Arcida
- Family: Arcidae
- Genus: Bathyarca
- Species: B. lucida

Binomial name
- Bathyarca lucida Poppe, Tagaro & Goto, 2018

= Bathyarca lucida =

Species of bivalve

Bathyarca lucida is a species of marine mollusk in the family Arcidae.

== Original description ==
- Poppe G.T., Tagaro S.P. & Goto Y. (2018). New marine species from the Central Philippines. Visaya. 5(1): 91-135. page(s): 115, pl. 15 figs 1-3.
