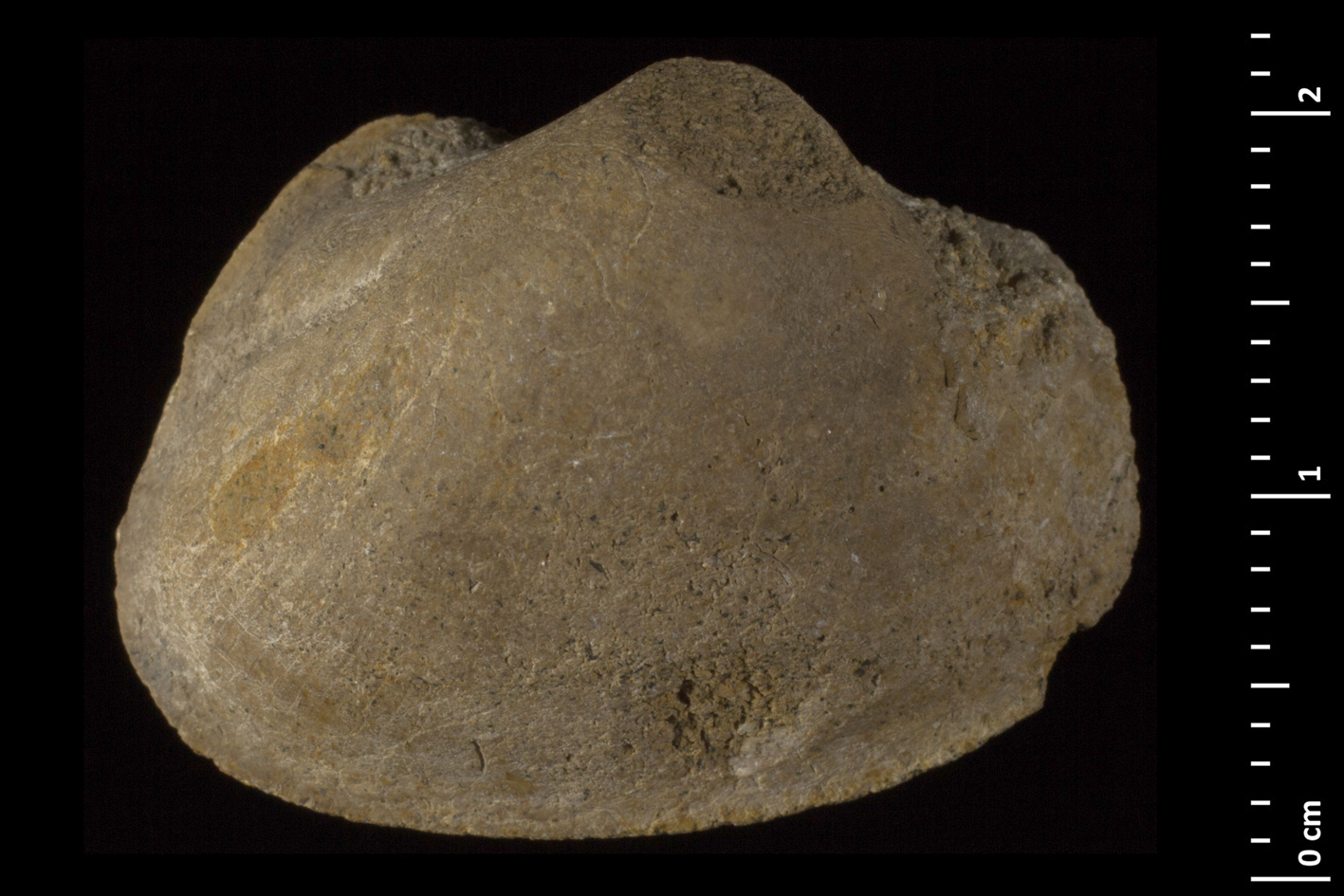

Conservation status
- Extinct

Scientific classification
- Domain: Eukaryota
- Kingdom: Animalia
- Phylum: Mollusca
- Class: Bivalvia
- Order: Arcida
- Family: Arcidae
- Genus: Arca
- Species: †A. mailleana

Binomial name
- †Arca mailleana d'Orbigny, 1844

= Arca mailleana =

Extinct species of bivalve

Arca mailleana is an extinct species of saltwater clam, a fossil marine bivalve mollusk in the family Arcidae, the ark shells. This species was described by Alcide d'Orbigny in 1843.

== Bibliography ==
- d'Orbigny, Alcide (1843). Paléontologie française. Description zoologique et géologique de tous les animaux mollusques & rayonnés fossiles de France. Vol. 3. Paris: Arthus Bertrand. p. 807.
