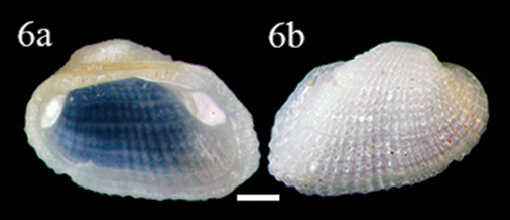

Scientific classification
- Kingdom: Animalia
- Phylum: Mollusca
- Class: Bivalvia
- Order: Arcida
- Family: Arcidae
- Genus: Barbatia
- Species: B. domingensis

Binomial name
- Barbatia domingensis (Lamarck, 1819)

= Barbatia domingensis =

Species of bivalve

Barbatia domingensis, or the White miniature ark clam, was for many years a name that was commonly used for a marine clam in the family Arcidae.

That species was found along the Atlantic coast of North America, ranging from Cape Hatteras to the West Indies and Bermuda.

However, Huber (2015, p.367-368) determined that the type material of Arca domingensis Lamarck, 1819 represents the species that had been usually treated as Barbatia cancellaria (Lamarck, 1819) in the literature. Huber argued that because Arca cancellaria Lamarck, 1819 does not have a type locality and bears doubtful type material, use of Arca domingensis is preferred, even though it upsets prevailing usage. Moreover, the correct name for the large, whitish, Caribbean species of Acar that had been previously identified as "Acar domingensis" (Lamarck, 1819) is currently unresolved. Source: Huber M. (2015). Compendium of Bivalves 2. Harxheim: ConchBooks. 907 pp.
