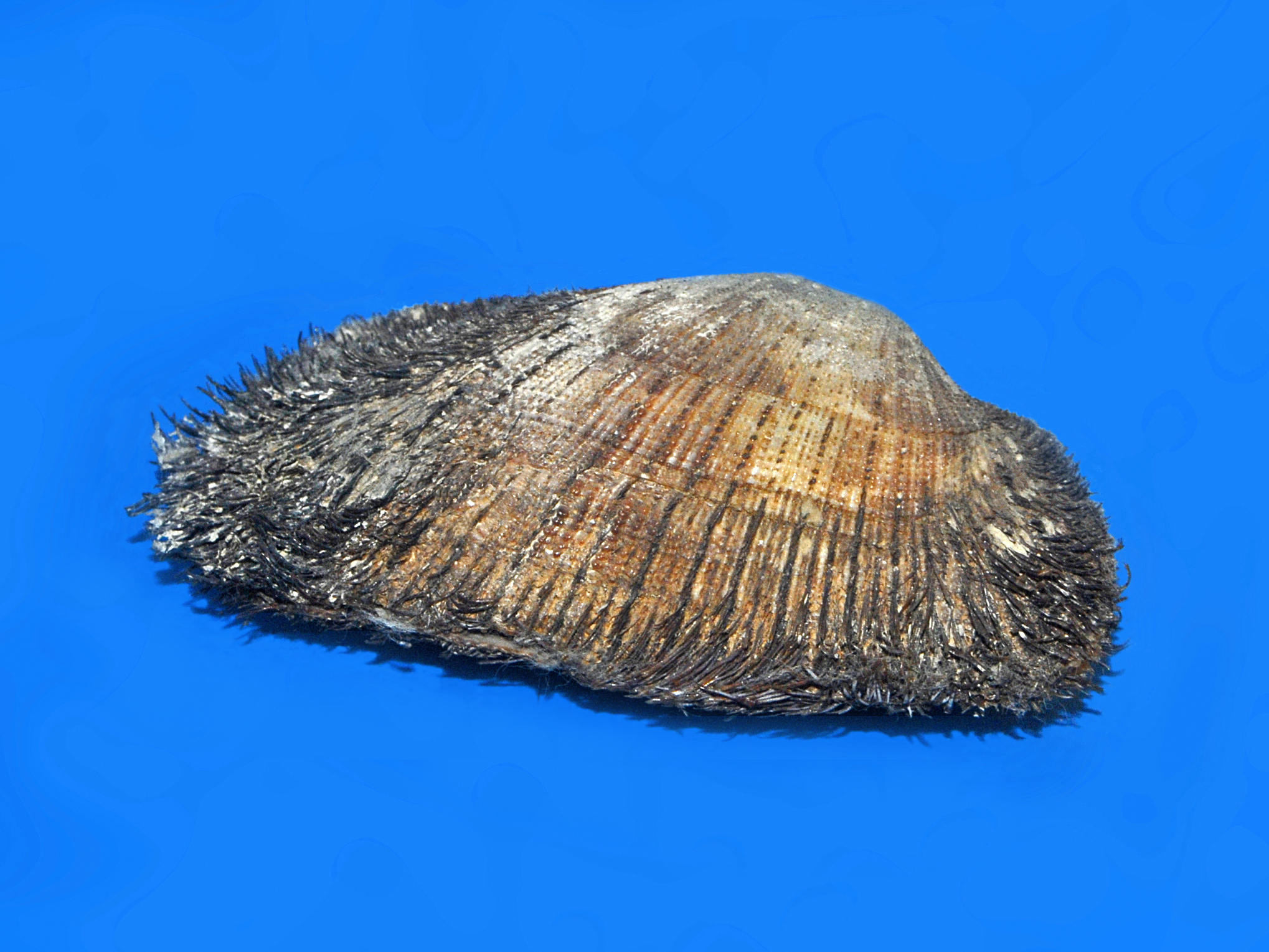
- Shell of Barbatia barbata from Sicily at the Museo Civico di Storia Naturale di Milano

Scientific classification
- Kingdom: Animalia
- Phylum: Mollusca
- Class: Bivalvia
- Order: Arcida
- Family: Arcidae
- Genus: Barbatia
- Species: B. barbata

Binomial name
- Barbatia barbata (Linnaeus, 1758)

Synonyms
- Arca bonnaniana Risso, 1826; Arca cylindrica Wood, 182; Arca magellanica Bruguière, 1789; Barbatia eximia Dunker, 1866

= Barbatia barbata =

Species of bivalve

Barbatia barbata is a species of ark clam, a marine bivalve mollusk in the family Arcidae, the ark clams.

== Description ==
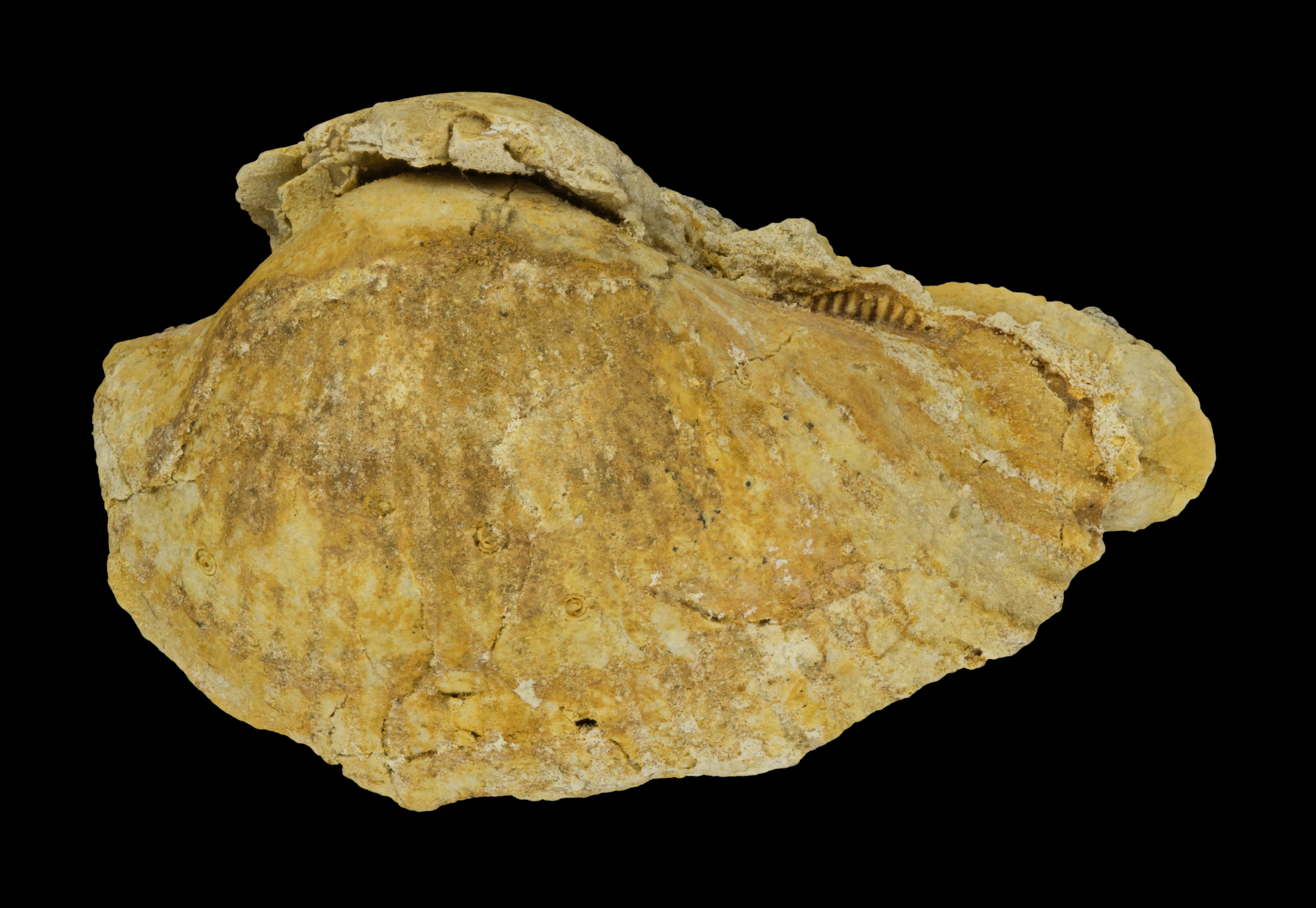
Fossil, Miocene

The shell of an adult Barbatia barbata can be as large as 35–100 millimetres (1.4–3.9 in). The shape of the shell of this common species is quite variable. Usually it is oblong and flattened, with many radial ribs cut by concentric lines. When alive or fresh dead, the shell has a characteristic hairy dark periostracum (hence the Latin name barbata, meaning "bearded"), covering the entire surface of the shell except for the apical part.

Right and left valve of the same specimen:

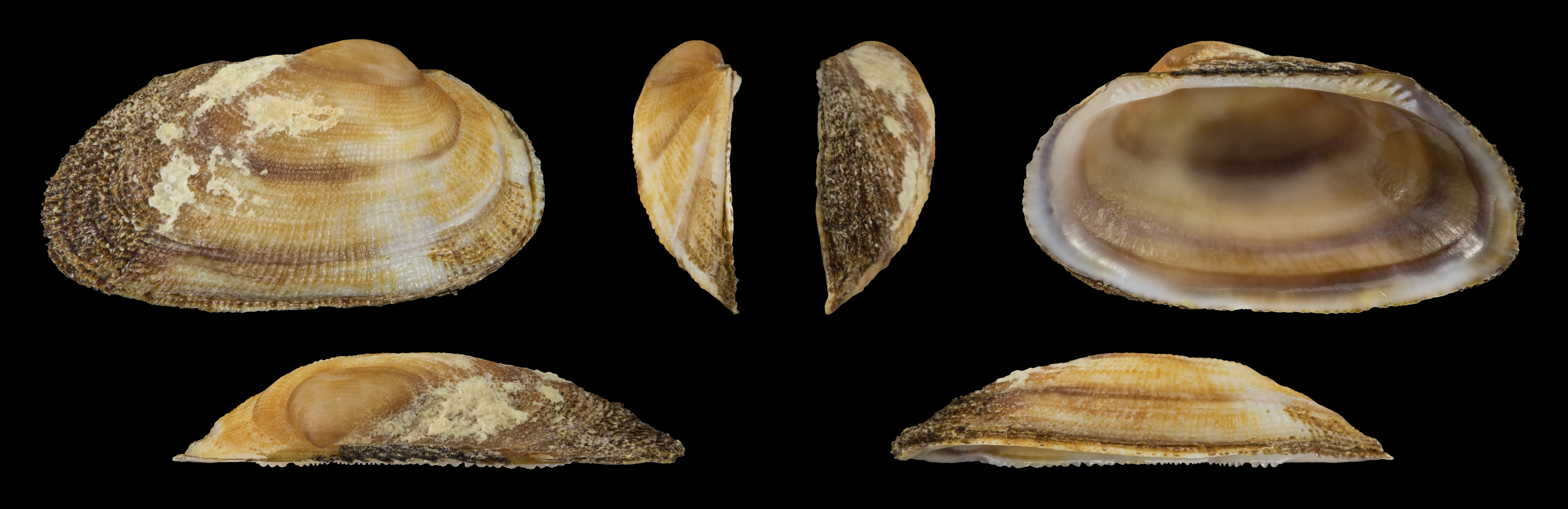
Right Valve

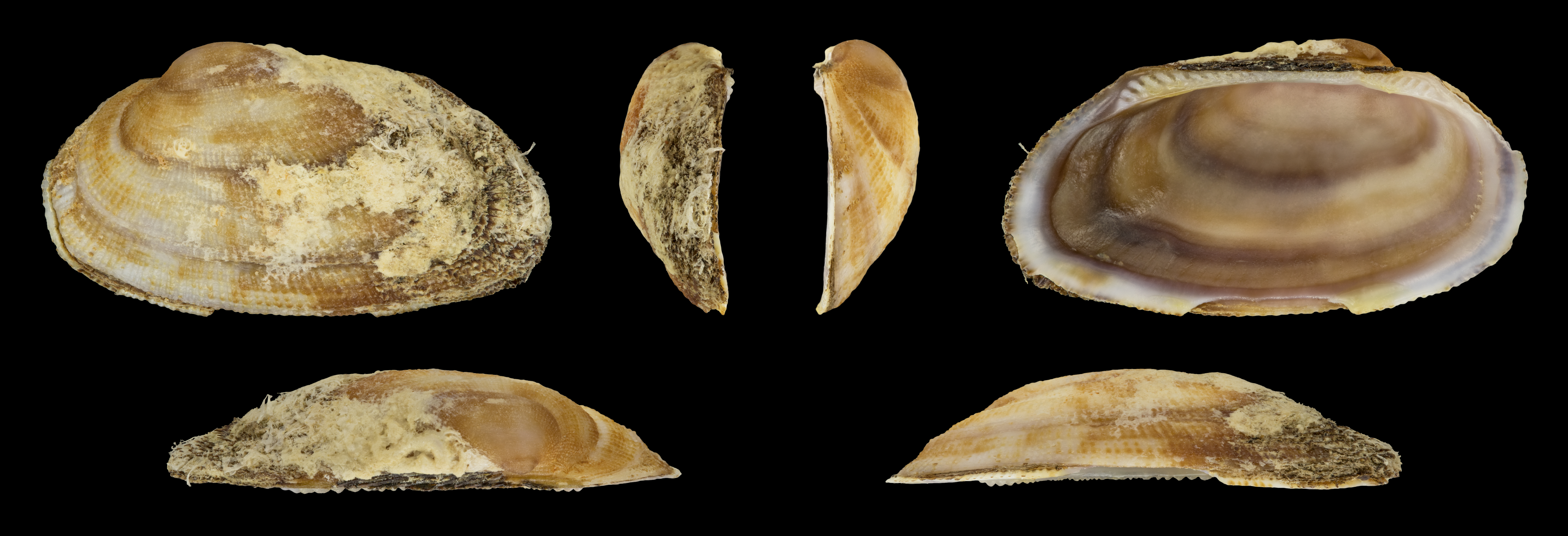
Left valve

Barbatia barbata var elongata
Right and left valve of the same specimen:

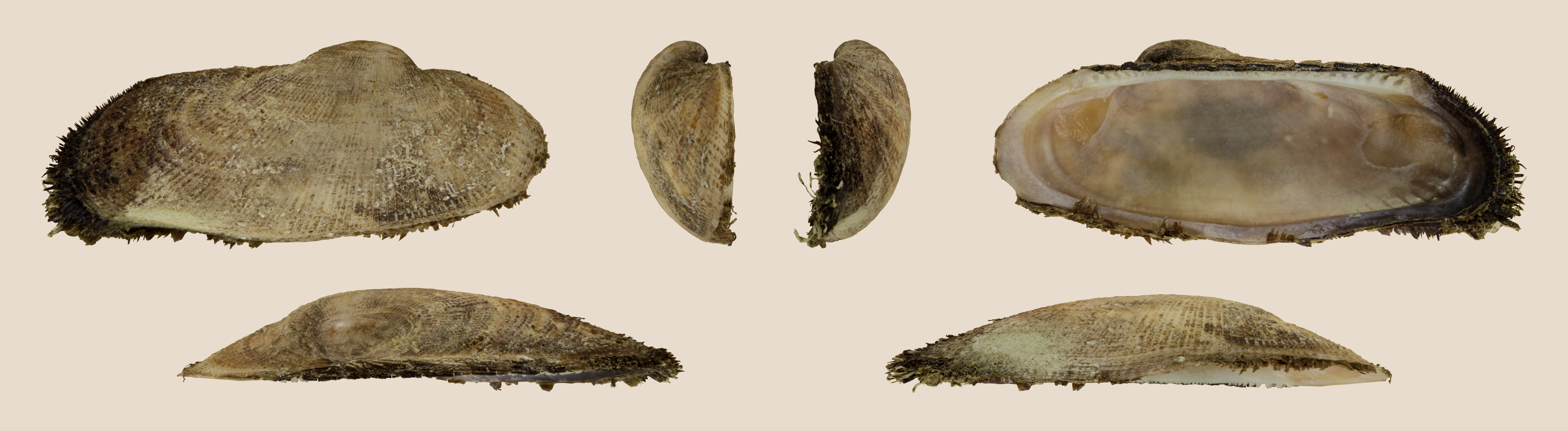
Right Valve

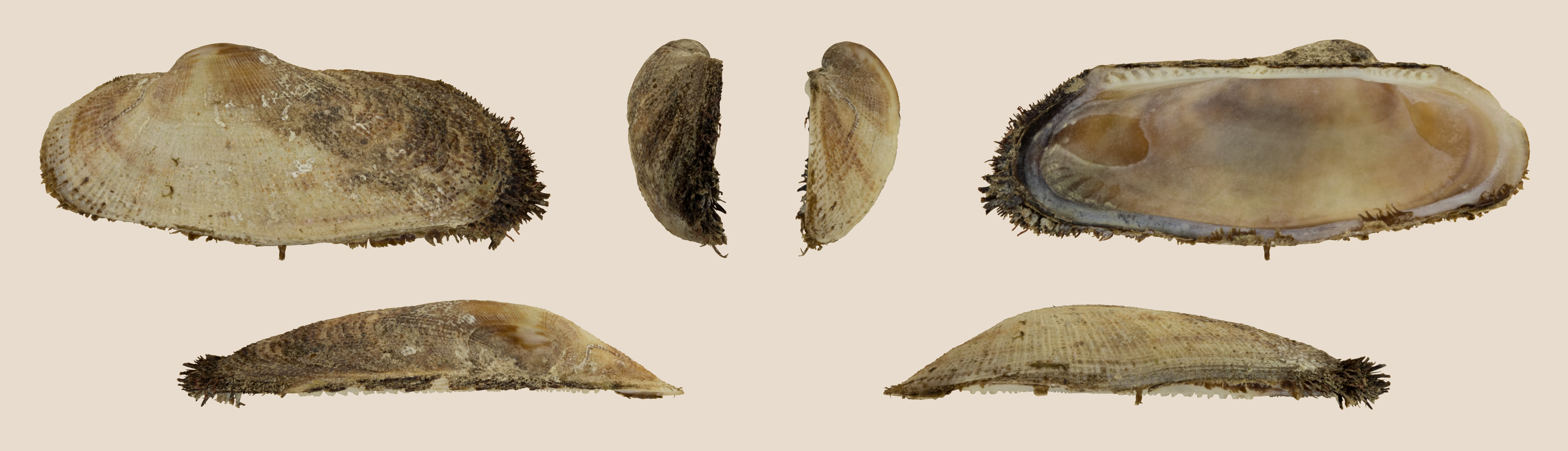
Left valve

== Distribution ==
This ark clam is found along the coasts of the Mediterranean Sea, especially in Greece, Italy and Tunisia.

== Habitat ==
This species lives on rocky or coralligenous (coral-bearing) seabed.
