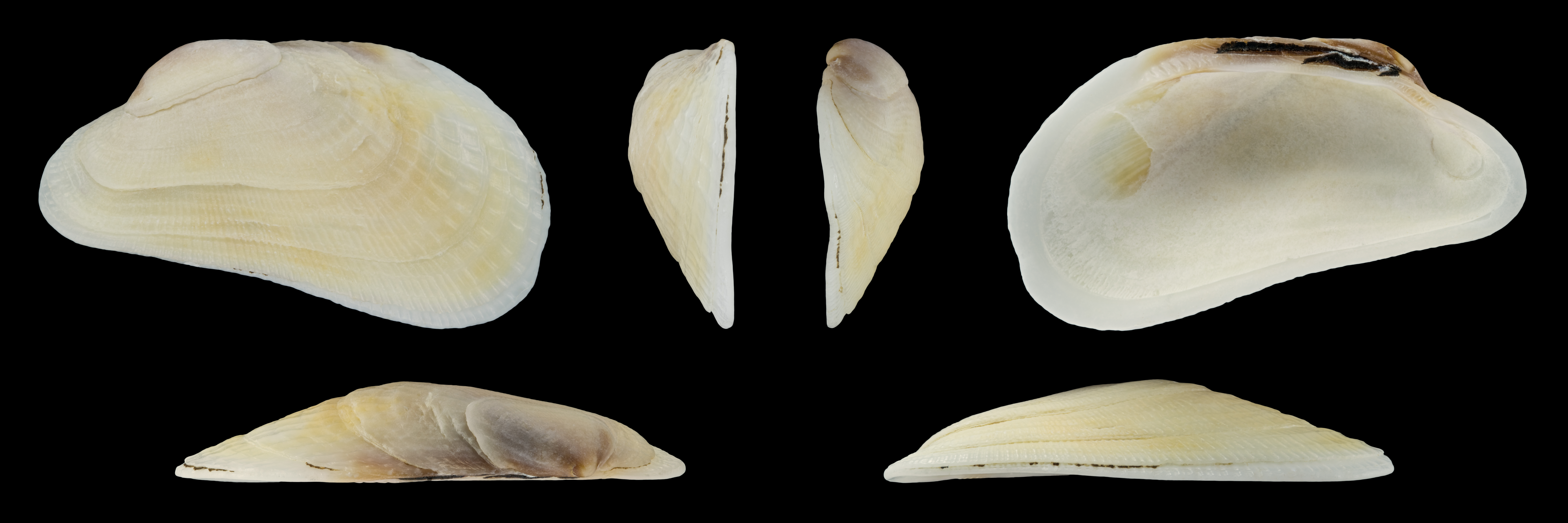

Scientific classification
- Domain: Eukaryota
- Kingdom: Animalia
- Phylum: Mollusca
- Class: Bivalvia
- Order: Arcida
- Family: Arcidae
- Genus: Barbatia
- Species: B. obliquata

Binomial name
- Barbatia obliquata (Wood, 1828)

= Barbatia obliquata =

Species of bivalve

Barbatia obliquata is a species of bivalve belonging to the family Arcidae.

The species is found from South Africa to Japan. It has the common name of oblique ark shell.
