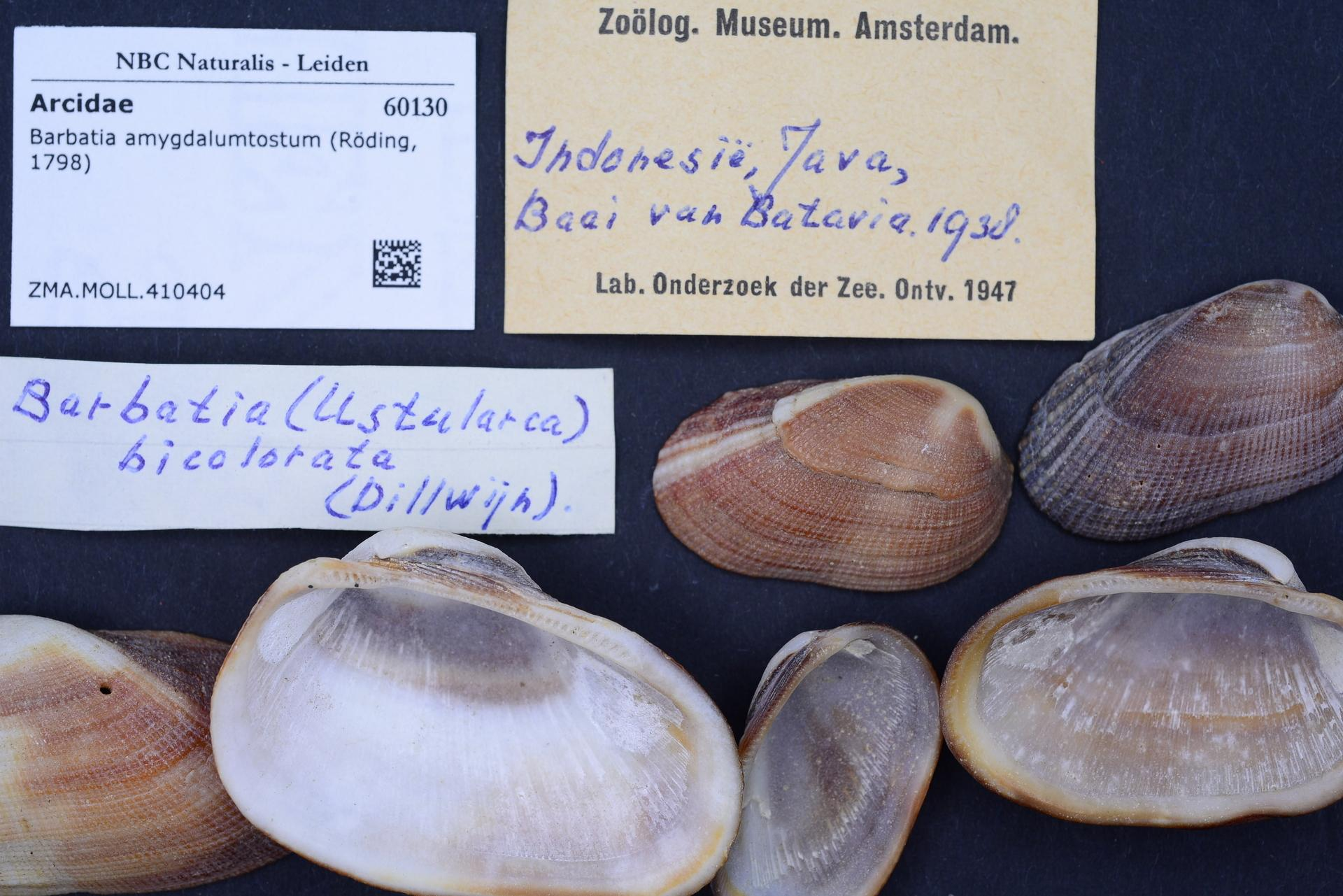

Scientific classification
- Domain: Eukaryota
- Kingdom: Animalia
- Phylum: Mollusca
- Class: Bivalvia
- Order: Arcida
- Family: Arcidae
- Genus: Barbatia
- Species: B. amygdalumtostum

Binomial name
- Barbatia amygdalumtostum (Röding, 1798)

Synonyms
- Amygdalum frixum Mörch, 1853; Arca amygdalum Link, 1807; Arca amygdalumtostum Röding, 1798; Arca bicolorata Dillwyn, 1817; Arca bicolorata Chemnitz, 1795; Arca cruciata Philippi, 1849; Arca fusca Bruguière, 1789; Barbatia fusca (Bruguière, 1789); Barbatia rodatzi Dunker, 1866; Ustularca cruciata (Philippi, 1849); Ustularca cruciata renuta Iredale, 1939; Ustularca renuta Iredale, 1939

= Barbatia amygdalumtostum =

Barbatia amygdalumtostum Temporal range: Miocene–recent

Species of clam

Barbatia amygdalumtostum, the almond ark or burnt-almond ark, is a species of bearded ark clams in the family Arcidae. It was described by Peter Friedrich Röding in 1798. Barbatia amygdalumtostum is found in the littoral and sublittoral of Indian and western Pacific Oceans. It is also known from the Miocene of Japan.

Barbatia amygdalumtostum can grow to 6 cm (2.4 in) shell length.

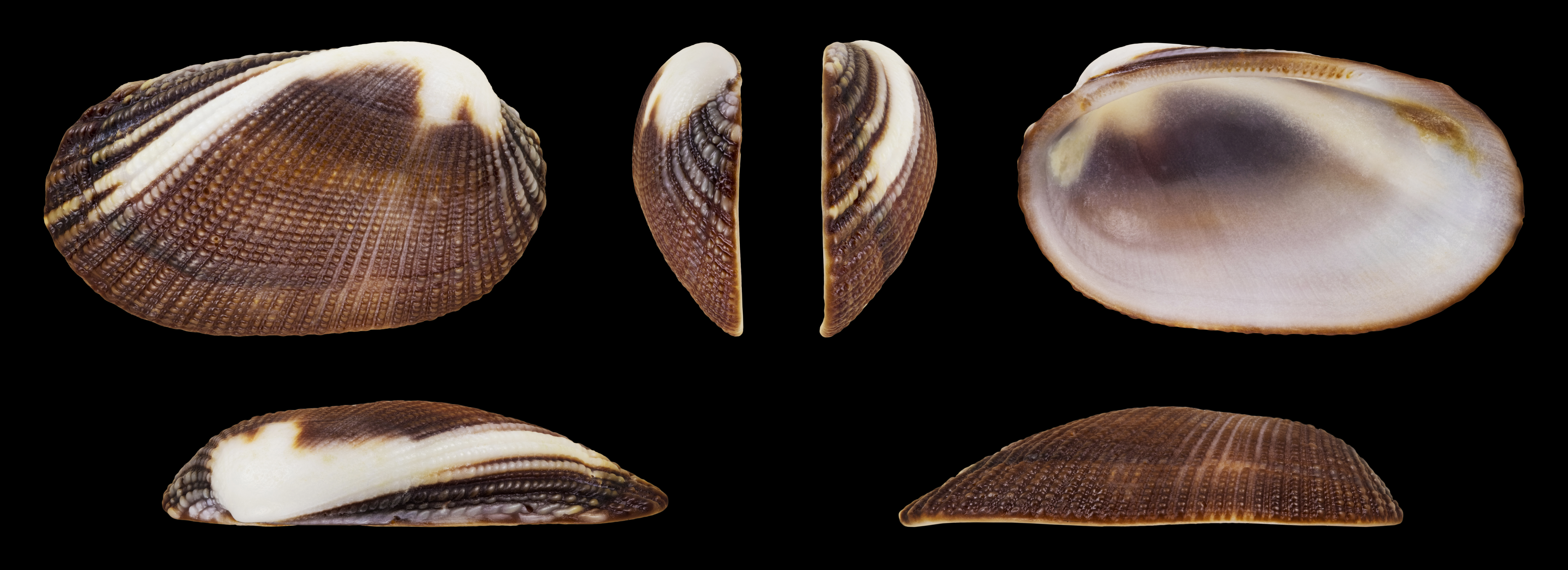
Right valve

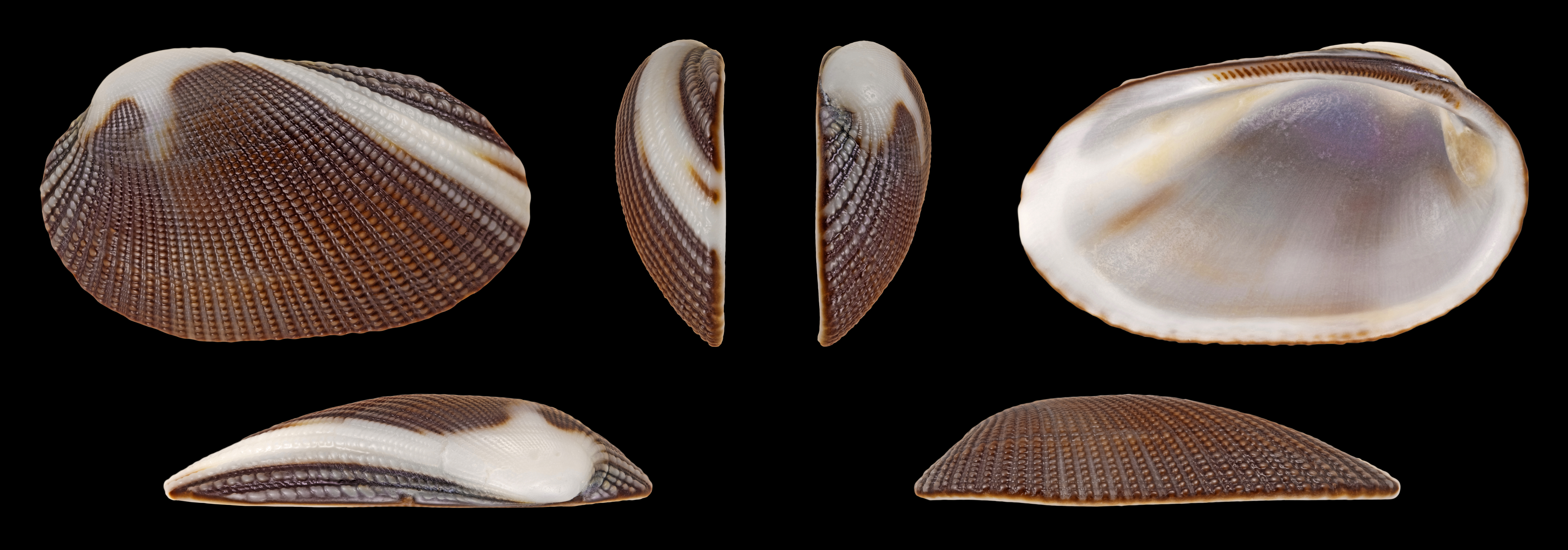
Left valve
