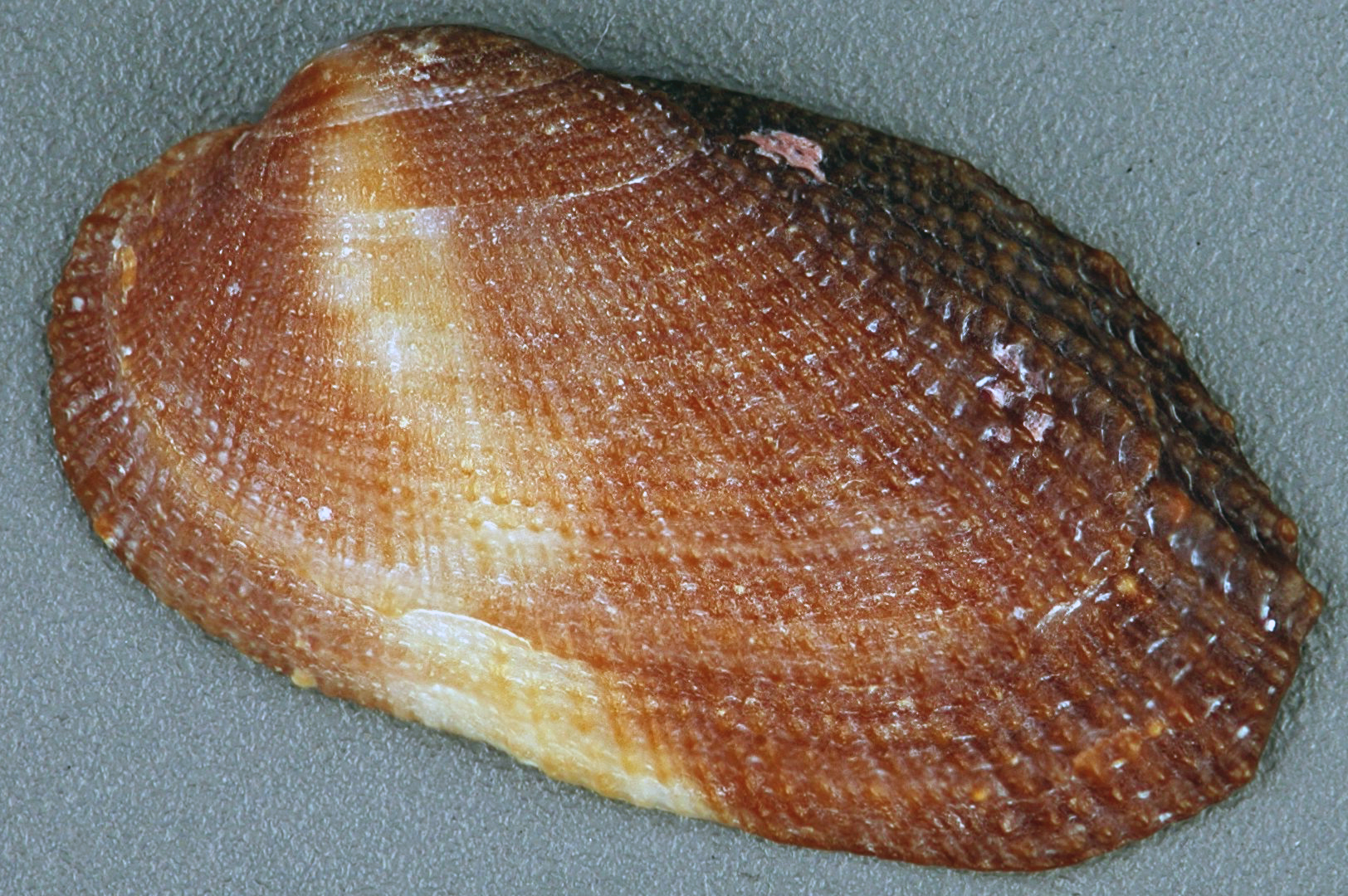

Scientific classification
- Kingdom: Animalia
- Phylum: Mollusca
- Class: Bivalvia
- Order: Arcida
- Family: Arcidae
- Genus: Barbatia
- Species: B. cancellaria

Binomial name
- Barbatia cancellaria (Lamarck, 1819)

= Barbatia cancellaria =

Species of bivalve

Barbatia cancellaria, or the Red-brown ark clam, is a clam in the family Arcidae. It can be found along the Atlantic coast of North America, ranging from Florida to the West Indies.

However, Huber (2015, p.367-368) determined that the type material of Arca domingensis Lamarck, 1819 represents the species that had been usually treated as Barbatia cancellaria (Lamarck, 1819) in the literature. Huber argued that because Arca cancellaria Lamarck, 1819 does not have a type locality and bears doubtful type material, use of Arca domingensis is preferred, even though it upsets prevailing usage. Moreover, the correct name for the large, whitish, Caribbean species of Acar that had been previously identified as Acar domingensis (Lamarck, 1819) is currently unresolved. Source: Huber M. (2015). Compendium of Bivalves 2. Harxheim: ConchBooks. 907 pp.
