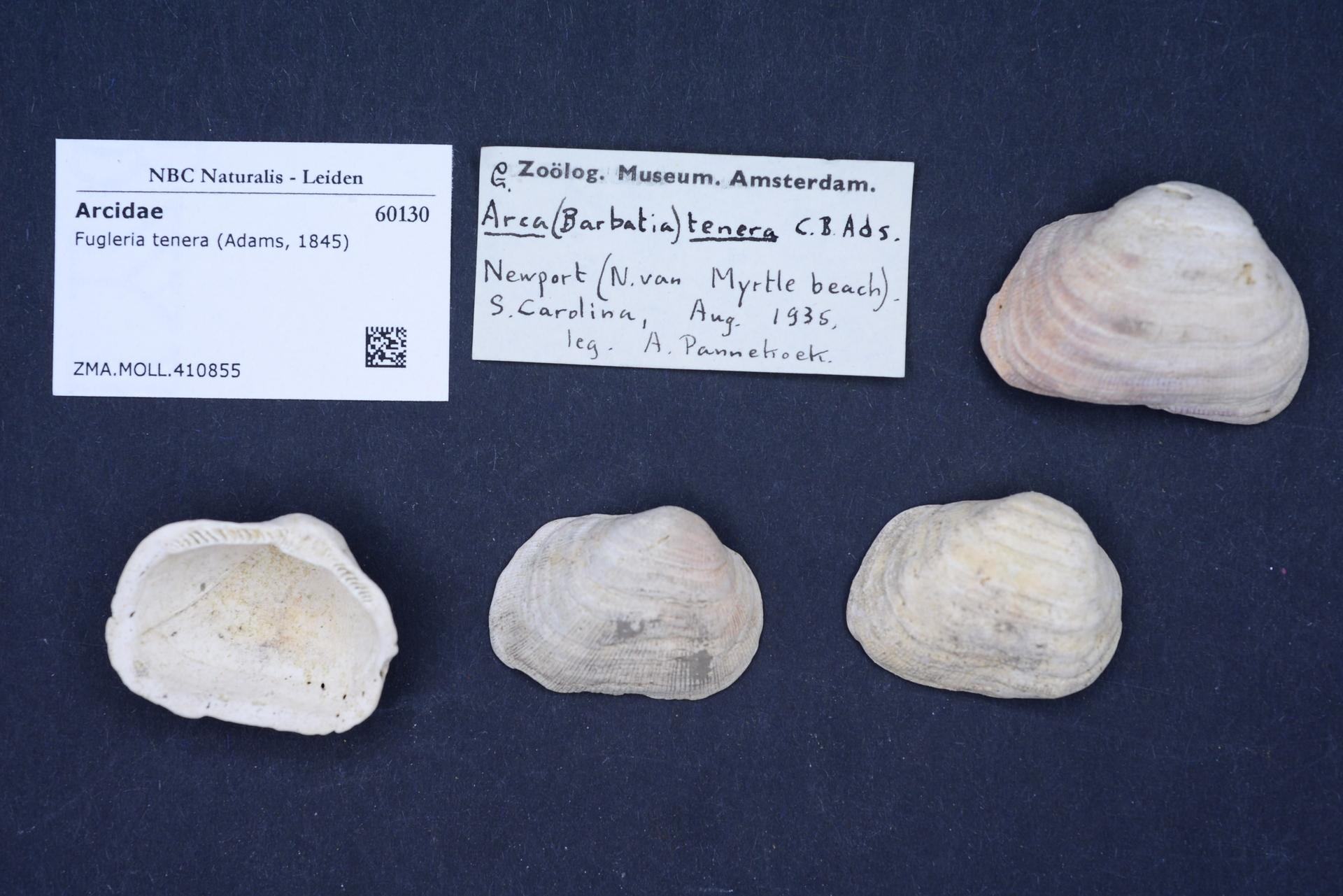

Scientific classification
- Kingdom: Animalia
- Phylum: Mollusca
- Class: Bivalvia
- Order: Arcida
- Family: Arcidae
- Genus: Barbatia
- Species: B. tenera

Binomial name
- Barbatia tenera (C.B. Adams, 1845)

= Barbatia tenera =

Species of bivalve

Barbatia tenera, or Doc Bales' ark clam, is a clam in the family Arcidae. It can be found along the Atlantic coast of North America, ranging from southern Florida to the West Indies.
