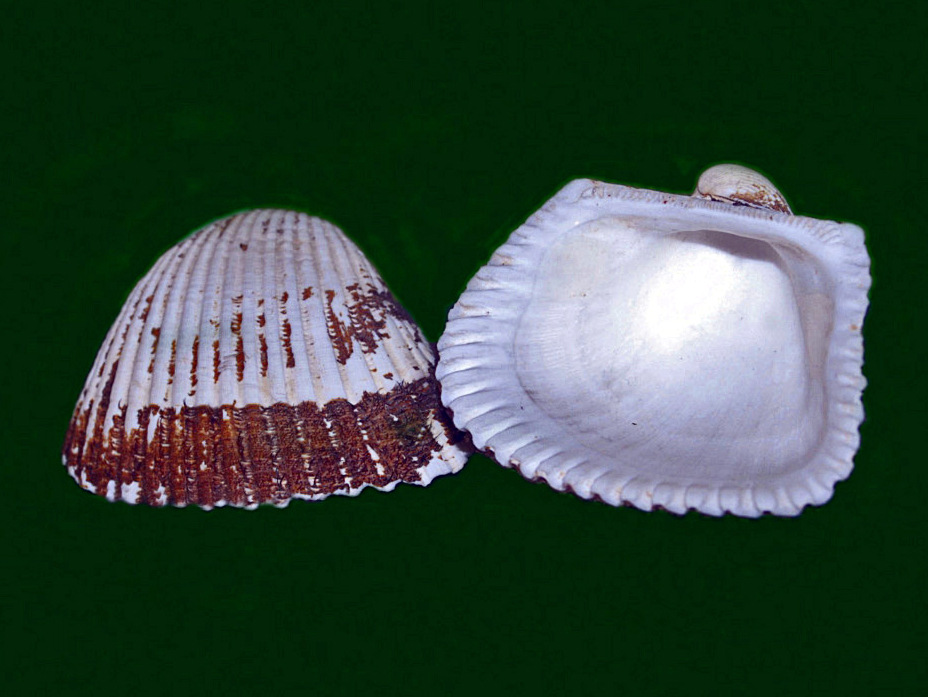
- A view of valves of Larkinia grandis

Scientific classification
- Domain: Eukaryota
- Kingdom: Animalia
- Phylum: Mollusca
- Class: Bivalvia
- Order: Arcida
- Family: Arcidae
- Genus: Larkinia
- Species: L. grandis

Binomial name
- Larkinia grandis (Broderip & G. B. Sowerby I, 1829)

Synonyms
- Anadara grandis (Broderip & G. B. Sowerby I, 1829); Anadara larkinii Nelson, 1870; Arca grandis Broderip & G. B. Sowerby I, 1829; Arca quadrilatera G. B. Sowerby I, 1833

= Larkinia grandis =

Species of bivalve

Larkinia grandis is a genus of saltwater clams in the family Arcidae, the ark clams.

== Description ==
Shell of Larkinia grandis can reach a diameter of about 7.5 centimetres (3.0 in) and a height of about 9.6 centimetres (3.8 in). These shells are white, with 26 ribs and a dark, smooth periostracum.

== Distribution ==
This species is present in the North Pacific Ocean (Mexico, El Salvador, Peru, Gulf of California).
