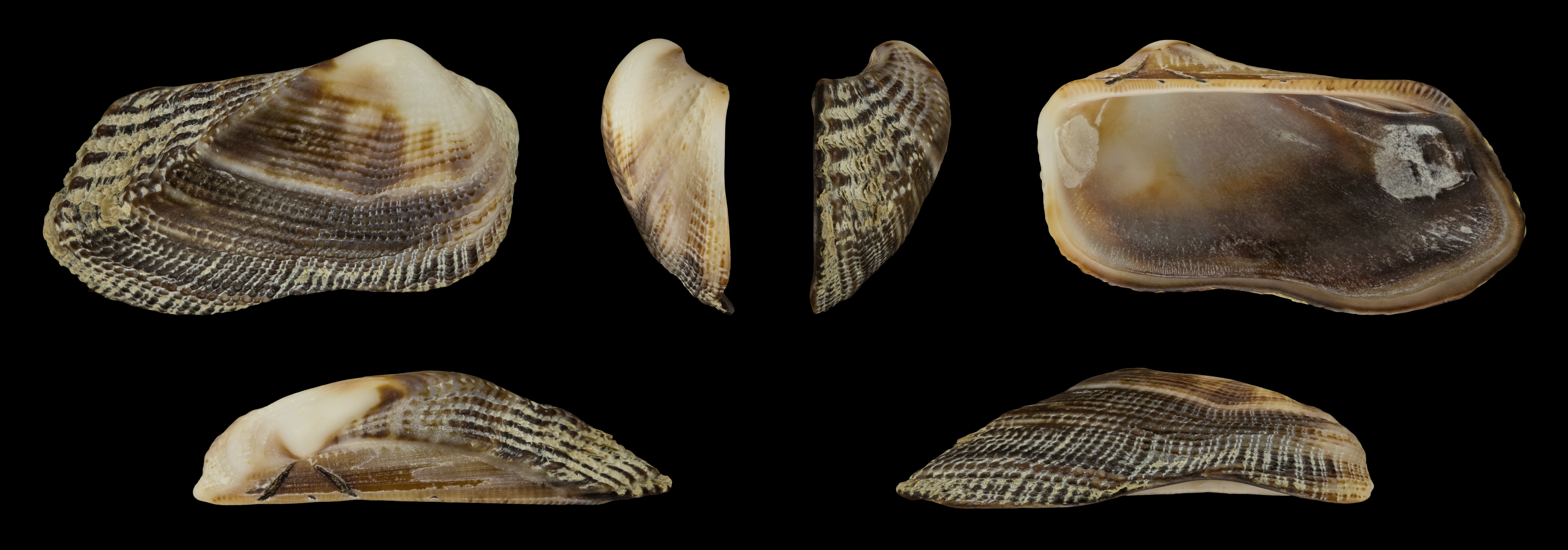

Scientific classification
- Kingdom: Animalia
- Phylum: Mollusca
- Class: Bivalvia
- Order: Arcida
- Family: Arcidae
- Genus: Arca
- Species: A. imbricata

Binomial name
- Arca imbricata Bruguière, 1789

= Arca imbricata =

Species of bivalve

Arca imbricata, or the Mossy ark clam, is a clam in the family Arcidae. It can be found along the Atlantic coast of North America, ranging from North Carolina to the West Indies, Brazil, and Bermuda.

== Description ==
Arca imbricata grows to about 2 ins (5 cm) in length. The valves have a roughly rectangular shape with a rounded anterior end and a slightly pointed posterior end. They are usually purplish-white in colour, but live specimens are covered in a thin brown protective periostracum. There are some distinct ribs on the posterior end and the margin is smooth. The hinge is long and straight with a number of fine teeth.
