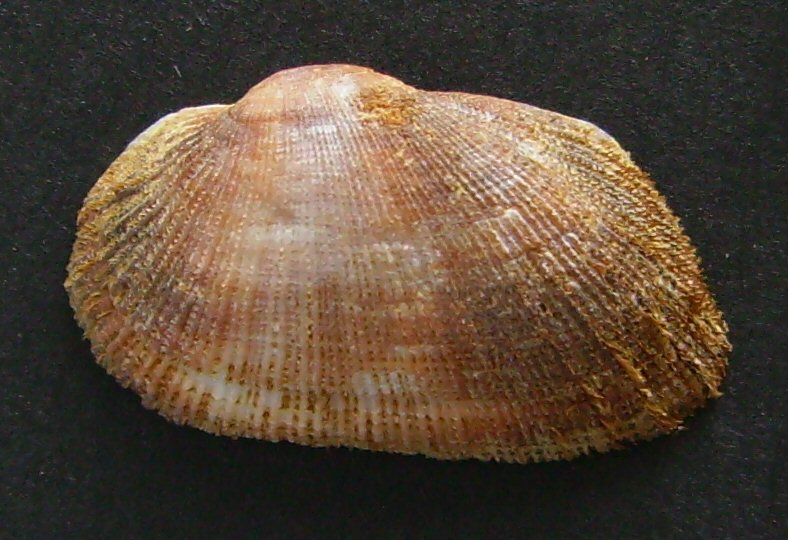

Scientific classification
- Kingdom: Animalia
- Phylum: Mollusca
- Class: Bivalvia
- Order: Arcida
- Family: Arcidae
- Genus: Barbatia
- Species: B. novaezelandiae

Binomial name
- Barbatia novaezelandiae (E.A. Smith, 1915)

= Barbatia novaezelandiae =

Species of bivalve

Barbatia novaezelandiae, or the New Zealand ark, is a bivalve mollusc of the family Arcidae.

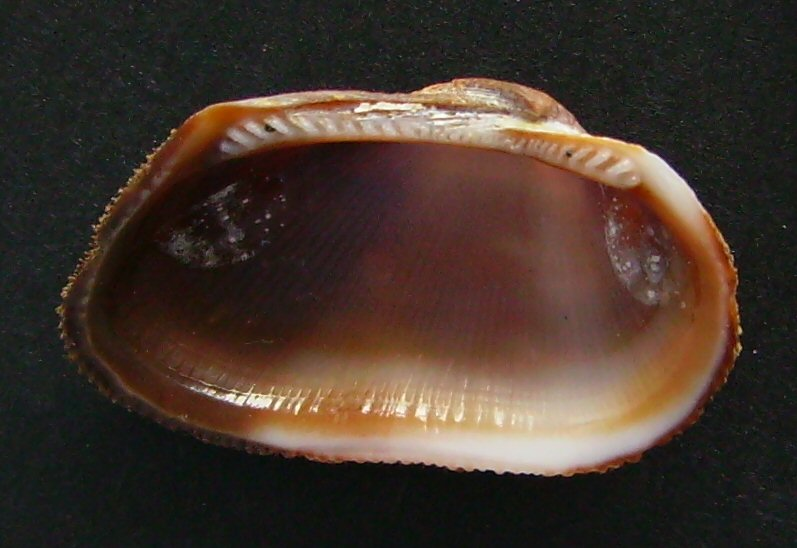
Barbatia novaezelandiae inside view
