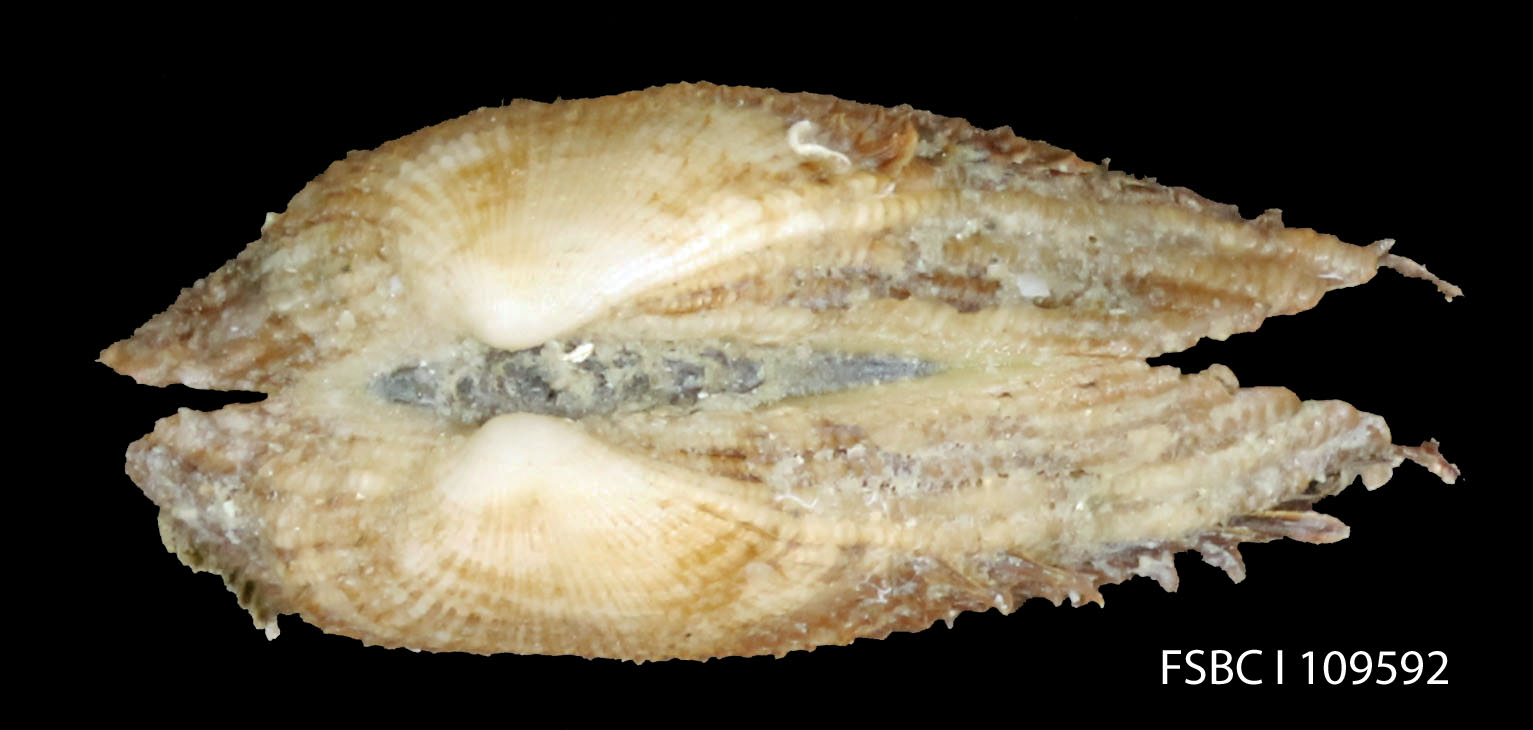

Scientific classification
- Kingdom: Animalia
- Phylum: Mollusca
- Class: Bivalvia
- Order: Arcida
- Family: Arcidae
- Genus: Barbatia
- Species: B. candida

Binomial name
- Barbatia candida (Helbling, 1771)

= Barbatia candida =

Species of bivalve

Barbatia candida, or the White-bearded ark clam, is a clam in the family Arcidae. It can be found along the Atlantic coast of North America, ranging from North Carolina to Texas, including the West Indies.

Note: WORMS does not accept this classification. The new classification is Cucullaerca candida (Hebling, 1779)
