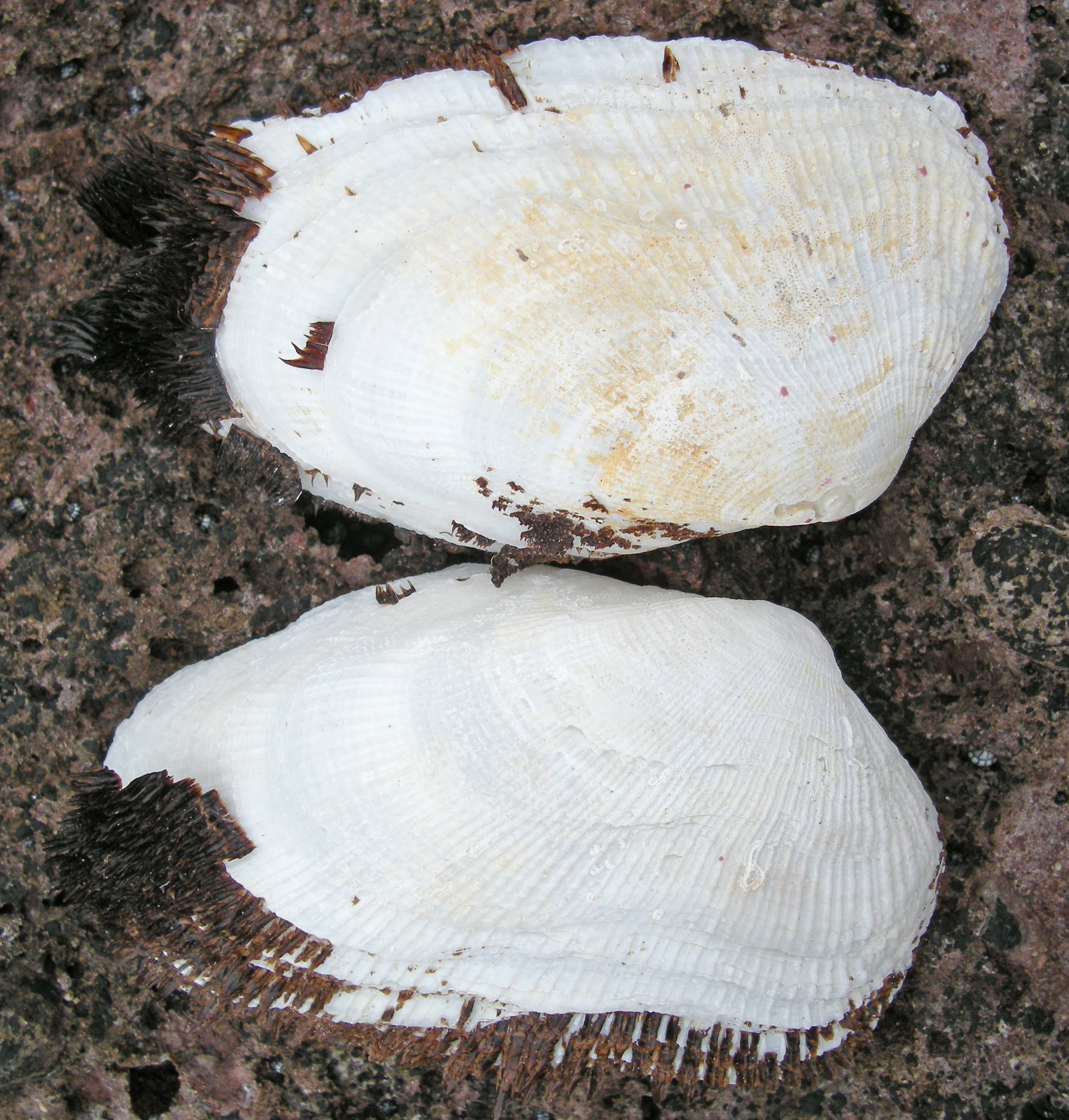
- Shell of Barbatia reeveana showing remnant periostracum

Scientific classification
- Domain: Eukaryota
- Kingdom: Animalia
- Phylum: Mollusca
- Class: Bivalvia
- Order: Arcida
- Family: Arcidae
- Genus: Barbatia
- Species: B. reeveana

Binomial name
- Barbatia reeveana (d'Orbigny, 1846)

Synonyms
- Arca reeveana d'Orbigny, 1846; Barbatia nova Mabille, 1895

= Barbatia reeveana =

Species of bivalve

Barbatia reeveana, the low-rib ark or common Reeve's ark, is a species of bivalve mollusc. It was first described to science by Alcide d'Orbigny in 1846. It seems likely that the species is named for Lovell Augustus Reeve, an eminent conchologist of the day who was mentioned in d'Orbigny's original description of the species.

== Description ==
The shell is white, and in life is covered by a green-brown "skin" or periostracum. The periostracum is not smooth, but frayed or hairy, thus the genus name Barbatia, or bearded. The shell is generally boat-shaped, as are all the clams in the Ark family, but this species often attaches itself between rocks so that as it grows the shell can be deformed by its surroundings. Cross-hatched ridges resembling a net, or reticulation, cover the surface of the shell. Sometimes this reticulation is worn away by friction with nearby rocks, and the shell can be smooth. There is a large gape between the valves along the bottom, ventral, side of the shell through which the byssus anchors the animal to a rocky substrate.

Barbatia reeveana may be 82mm long, 45mm high, and 29mm deep.

== Distribution ==
Barbatia reeveana is found on rocky bottoms from the intertidal zone to 100 meters (330 feet) deep. It may be found in the eastern Pacific Ocean from Baja California Sur, Mexico to Peru and west to the Galapagos islands, as well as in the Gulf of California.

== Life history ==
Individuals in this species are typically either male or female, with some small portion protandrous hermaphrodites, maturing as males and later in life reproducing as females. They reproduce by broadcast spawning, with individuals releasing eggs and sperm into the water to achieve fertilization. Fertilized eggs develop into free-swimming larvae, These develop into planktonic veligers, which feed on tiny phytoplankton. In the presence of appropriate chemical cues, a veliger will settle to the bottom, attach itself to a rocky substrate and become a juvenile.
