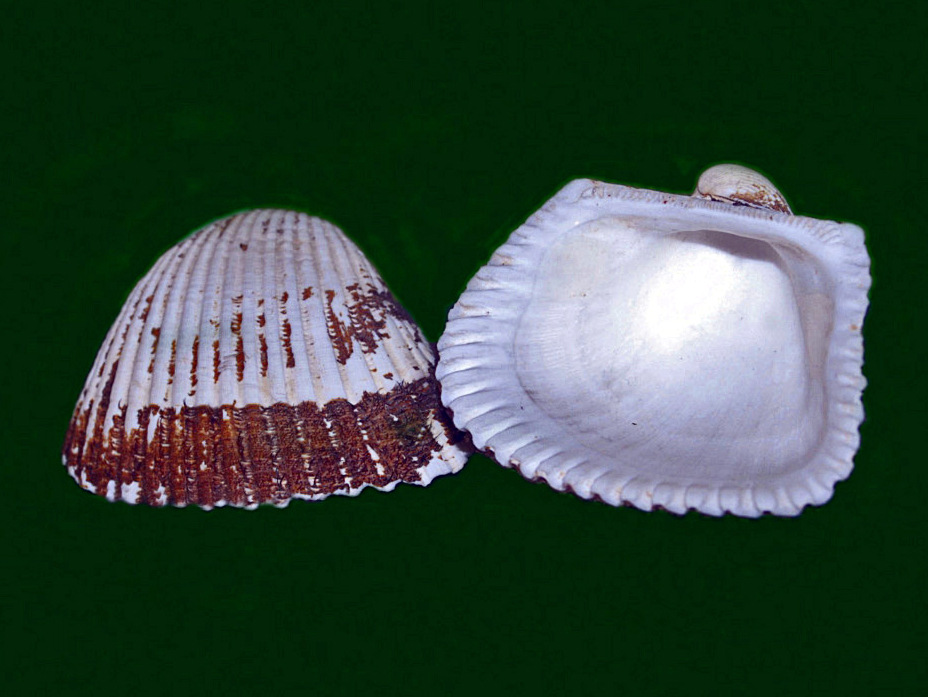
- A view of valves of Larkinia grandis

Scientific classification
- Domain: Eukaryota
- Kingdom: Animalia
- Phylum: Mollusca
- Class: Bivalvia
- Order: Arcida
- Family: Arcidae
- Genus: Larkinia; Reinhart, 1935

= Larkinia =

Genus of bivalves

Larkinia is a genus of saltwater clams in the family Arcidae, the ark clams.

== Species ==
Species within the genus Larkinia include:

- Larkinia grandis (Broderip & G. B. Sowerby I, 1829)
- Larkinia multicostata (G. B. Sowerby I, 1833)
