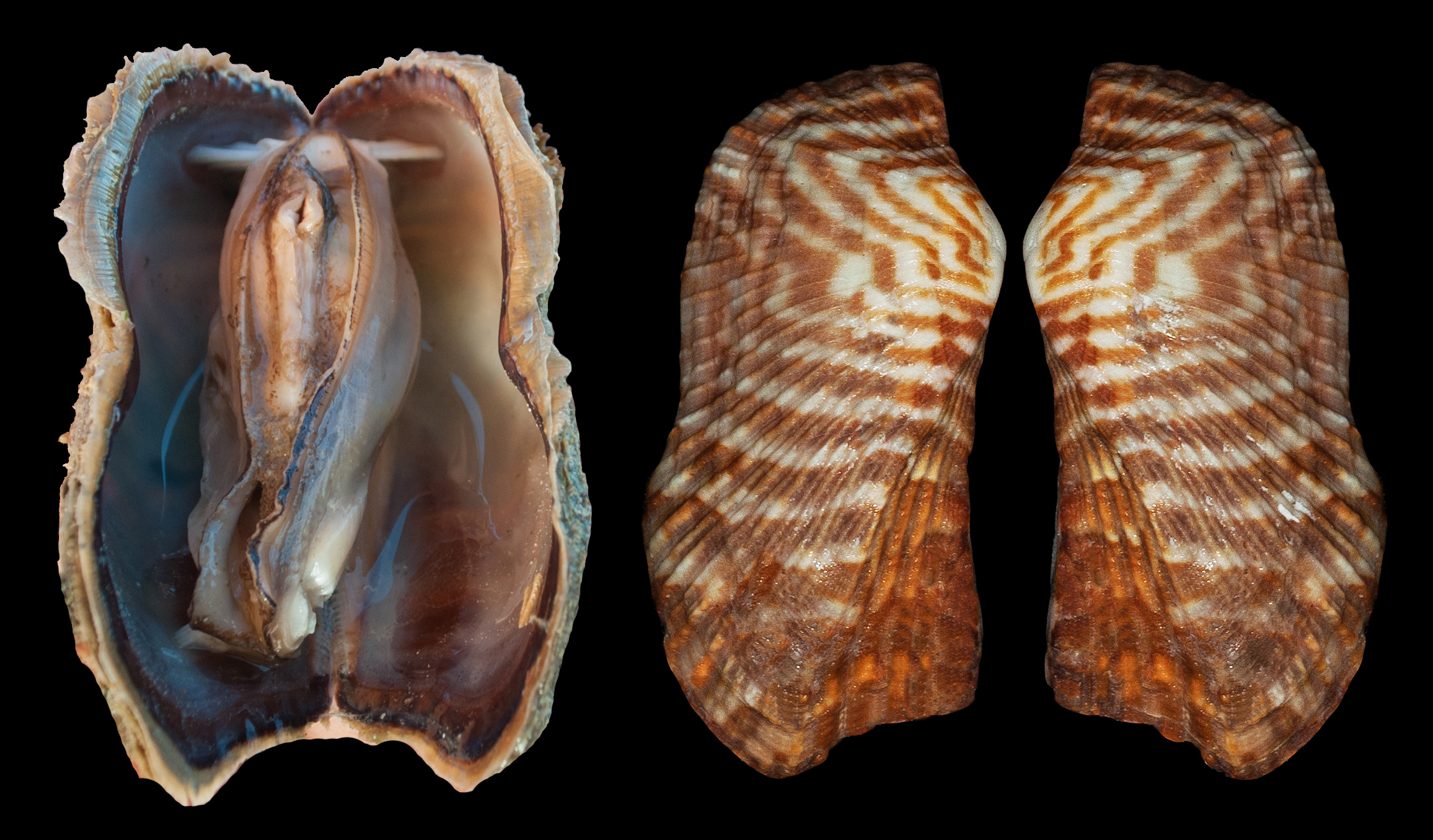
- Interior and exterior of a shell of Arca zebra

Scientific classification
- Kingdom: Animalia
- Phylum: Mollusca
- Class: Bivalvia
- Order: Arcida
- Family: Arcidae
- Genus: Arca
- Species: A. zebra

Binomial name
- Arca zebra (Swainson, 1833)

= Arca zebra =

Species of bivalve

Arca zebra, or the turkey wing ark clam (or simply turkey wing), is a bivalve mollusc in the family Arcidae, the ark clams.

== Description ==
=== Distribution ===
This species is found along the Atlantic coast of North America, ranging from North Carolina to the West Indies and Bermuda. It attaches itself to rocks or other hard substrates in shallow water with byssus threads.

=== Morphology ===
The shell of Arca zebra is boldly striped in brown and white which gives it a resemblance to the wing of a wild turkey. The whole shell (when both valves are together) has also been likened to Noah's Ark. It is a sturdy shell growing up to 4 in (10 cm) long and 2 in wide. The umbones are separated by a shallow depression, and the hinge is long and straight with about 50 small teeth. There is coarse sculpturing fanning out from the umbones. The inside of the shell is whitish or pale mauve.

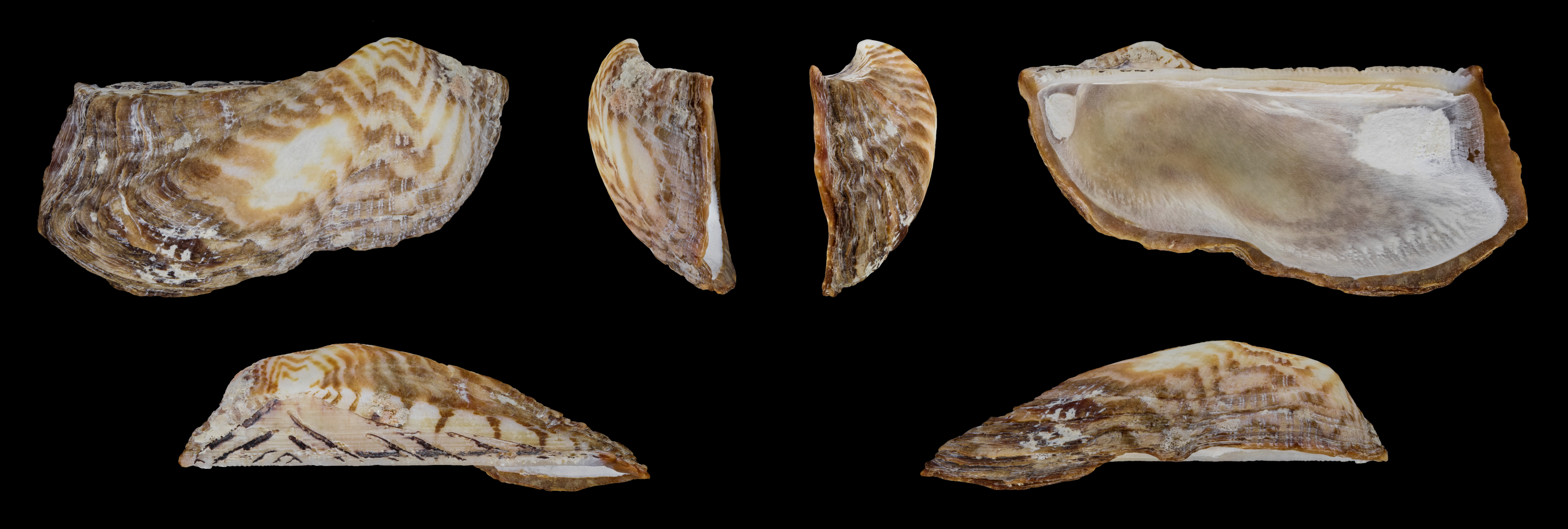
Right valve

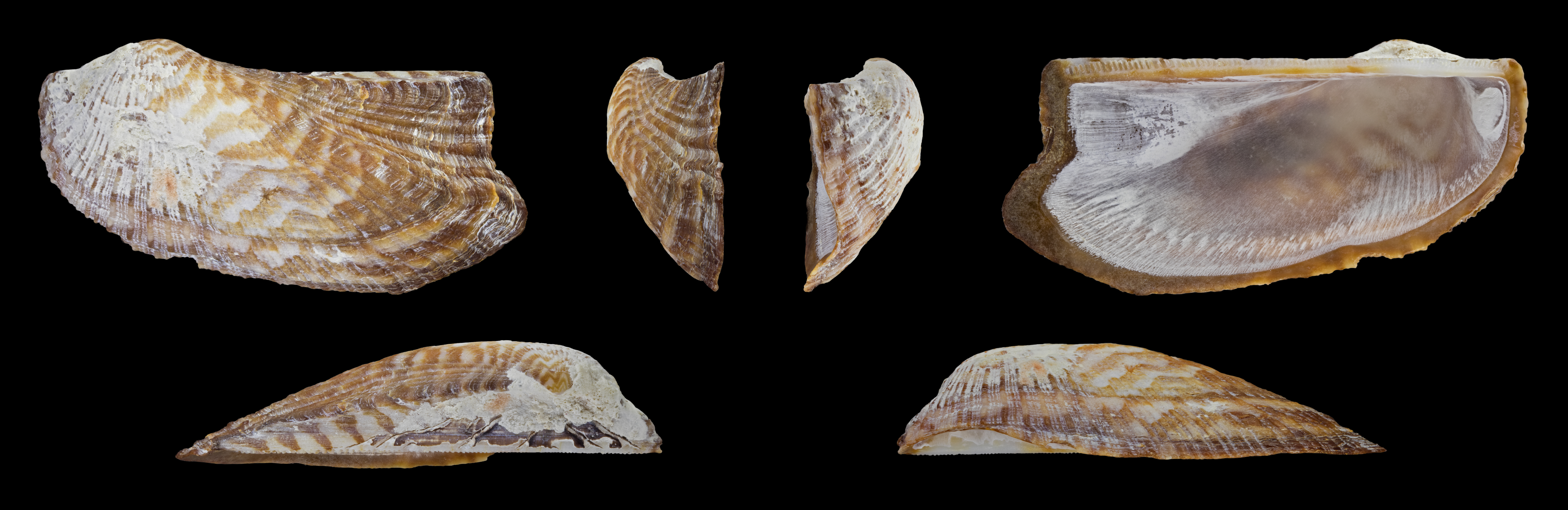
Left valve

== Ecology ==
=== Feeding ===
Arca zebra is a filter feeder, taking in surrounding water and particulates through its reduced siphons and expelling water while consuming microscopic algae, diatoms, and phytoplankton.

=== Reproduction ===
Arca zebra is a protandric hermaphrodite, a type of sequential hermaphrodite with individuals starting out as males and developing female reproductive capacity later in the life cycle. Reproduction is dependent on food availability and seasonal changes. The gonad tissues of Arca zebra change in mass throughout the year. The percentage of somatic tissue mass composed of gonad tissue mass sees a large increase from roughly 4% to 40% from May through late September and a large decrease from roughly 40% to 3% from October through January. The percentage then increases slightly from about 3% to 12% in February before decreasing to around 4% between March and April. Highest reproductive activity occurs around July through late September, when the gonad mass is at its greatest.

Gonad development begins when the shells of Arca zebra are at 18-20mm, and full sexual maturity is reached when the shells are 50-55mm. Larger individuals have greater reproductive output.

Arca zebra has two reproductive periods, one from June to July and the other in September. During each spawn, females can spawn up to four million eggs. Trochophore larvae, a type of planktonic larvae, begin to develop twelve hours after the eggs are fertilized. Six days after fertilization, the larvae begin to take on their adult shape. Eyespots develop seven days after fertilization, with the foot developing soon after. Around the same time the foot develops, food-seeking behavior in the substratum, the sediment at the bottom of the ocean floor, can be observed. Twelve days after fertilization, the larvae begin to settle; about 45% of the larvae reach this stage. Once the larvae reach adulthood, growth mainly happens in the summer, with growth in the summer happening about three times as quickly as in the winter.

=== Biochemistry ===
Like other marine bivalves, the biochemical composition in the tissues of Arca zebra fluctuate in response to environmental conditions including water temperature, nutrient availability, and contaminant concentration. The soft tissues see changes in protein, carbohydrate, and lipid concentrations. Anthropogenic inputs into habitats of A. zebra can cause further fluctuations in the biochemical composition in the tissues. Lipophilic organic contaminants can accumulate in the tissues, and too high a concentration of these contaminants can interfere with normal lipid metabolism, impacting cell membrane synthesis and integrity as well as lysosomal activity. Contaminant inputs can also influence the levels of lead, polychlorinated biphenyl, petroleum hydrocarbons, and tributyltin (TBT) in the tissues. TBT is utilized in some boat paints, contributing to its input into the marine habitats of A. zebra. Overexposure to TBT has deleterious impacts on A. zebra, including reduced feeding and increased energy expenditure.

=== Ecological Effects ===
Arca zebra is the dominant species in its most well-observed habitats of Chacopata, Venezuela. It lives among a number of other species, most notably the Akoya pearl oyster, the leafy jewel box clam, the eared ark clam, and Modiolus squamosus. It is preyed upon by the apple murex, the West Indian murex, and the bent-beak murex, all species of predatory murex snails.

Arca zebra also lives in association with a variety of microgastropod species, gastropods that measure less than 5mm in length. The most common ones found among A. zebra are some species of the top-snails, true whelks, and margin shells. However, their ecological relationship to A. zebra is not well understood as their small size makes these species difficult to study.

Arca zebra has a large impact in the ecology of its habitat as beds of A. zebra serve as both food and shelter for a variety of other shallow water marine organisms. Regions with greater Arca zebra bed density also see greater abundance, richness, and taxonomic distinctness in decapod crustaceans. The crevices that Arca zebra beds provide also support the development of richer faunal communities.

=== Aquaria ===
Arca zebra are sometimes hitchhikers on live rock, ending up in saltwater fish tanks. They blow out debris in little plumes that may be noticed by the tank owner, leading to their discovery.

== Human relevance ==
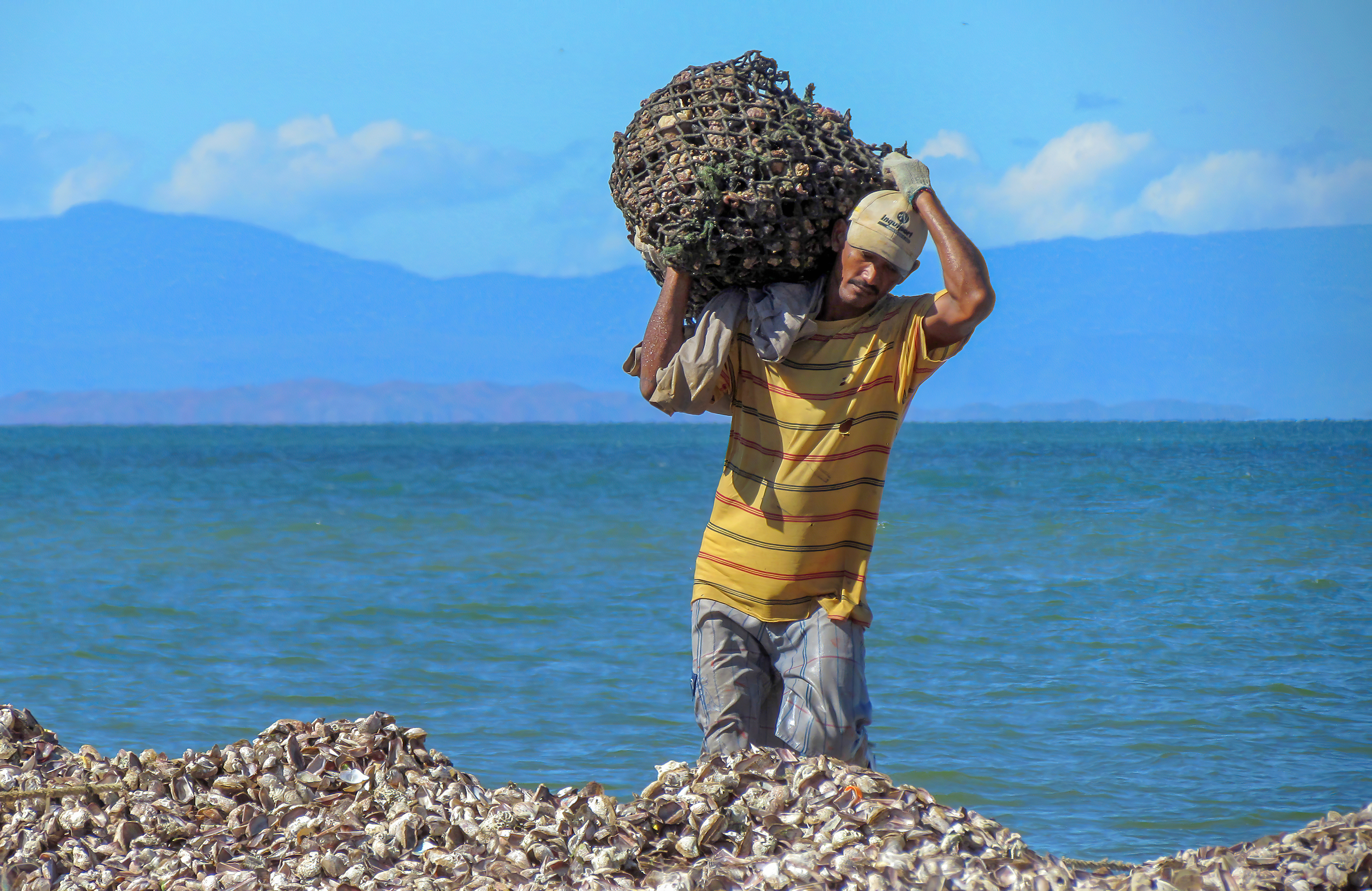
Arca zebra fisherman at the end of the workday, Margarita Island, Venezuela

=== Fishing ===
Arca zebra are caught for human consumption and canning. As efficient filter feeders, they convert large amounts of planktonic mass into biomass usable by humans. A large bed spanning 70–80 km^{2} in the Cacopata region of the Araya Peninsula, Venezuela has been a site of fishing since 1940. The annual catch generally ranges from 15,792 to 33,986 tons per year but has reached 40,000 tons in the past. It is a significant income source for Venezuelan artisanal fisheries. These fisheries employ non-selective fishing methods, resulting in significant bycatch of other molluscs, including the endangered music volute. Bycatch also frequently includes the aforementioned Akoya pearl oyster, leafy jewel box clam, and apple murex as well as non-mollusc species.
