= Samacar =

Scientific classification
- Kingdom: Animalia
- Phylum: Mollusca
- Class: Bivalvia
- Order: Arcida
- Family: Arcidae
- Genus: Samacar; Iredale, 1936

Species
- Samacar aleutica Kamenev, 2007; Samacar kurilensis Kamenev, 2007; Samacar strabo (Hedley, 1915)

Genus of bivalves

Samacar is a genus of bivalves in the family Arcidae which has three species. It was first described by malacologist Tom Iredale in 1936 with the type taxon S. strabo found in Dundas, New South Wales, Australia. Shells are about 11 millimeters long. This genus spans throughout the Tasman Sea and Pacific Ocean reaching as far north as Japan
