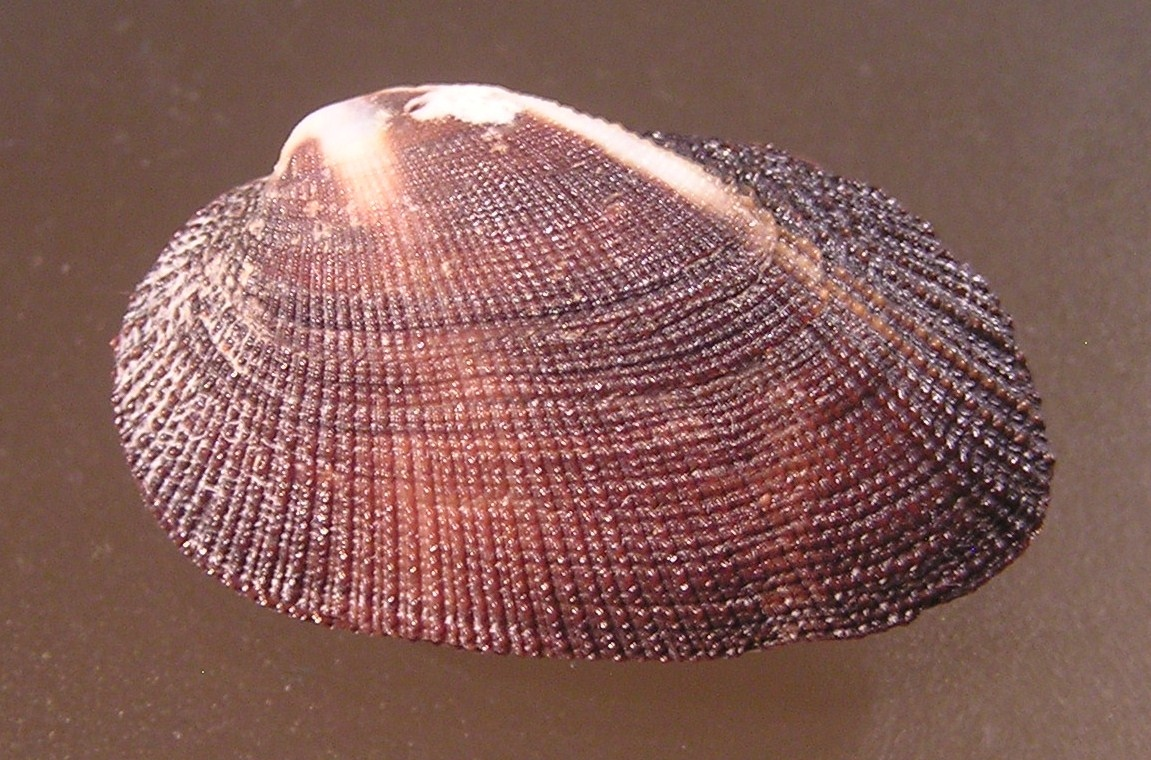
- Barbatia amygdalumtostum
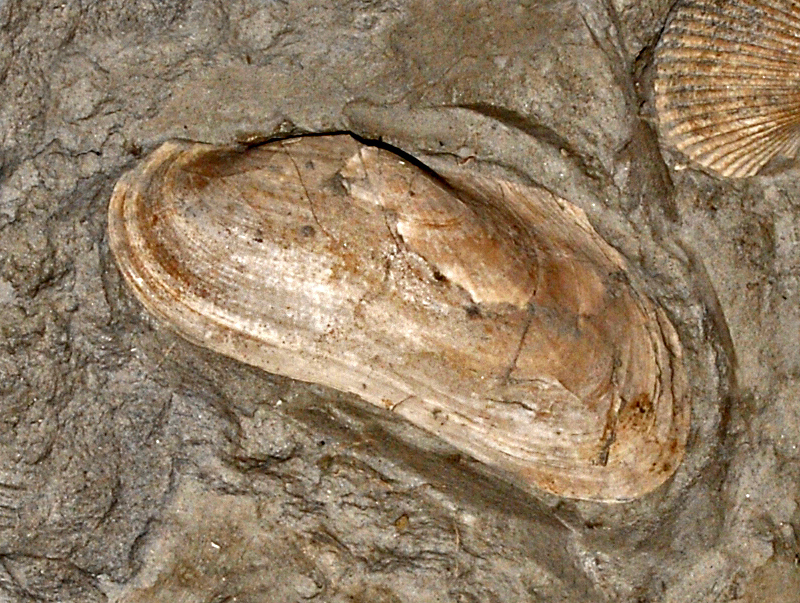
- Fossil of †Barbatia mytiloides

Scientific classification
- Kingdom: Animalia
- Phylum: Mollusca
- Class: Bivalvia
- Order: Arcida
- Family: Arcidae
- Genus: Barbatia; Gray, 1847

Species
- See text.

= Barbatia =

Barbatia Temporal range: Jurassic - Recent

Genus of bivalves

Barbatia is a genus of "bearded" ark clams, marine bivalve mollusks in the family Arcidae, the ark clams.

This genus is known in the fossil record from the Jurassic period to the Quaternary period (age range: 167.7 to 0.0 million years ago). These fossils have been found all over the world.

== Species ==
Species within the genus Barbatia include:

- Barbatia amygdalumtostum (Röding, 1798)
- Barbatia barbata (Linnaeus, 1758)
- Barbatia bullata (Reeve, 1844)
- Barbatia cancellaria (Lamarck, 1819) - red-brown ark
- Barbatia candida (Helbling, 1779) - white-beard ark
- Barbatia clathrata
- Barbatia cometa (Reeve, 1844)
- Barbatia complanata (Bruguière, 1789)
- Barbatia divaricata (Sowerby, 1833)
- Barbatia decussata (G. B. Sowerby I, 1833)
- Barbatia domingensis (Lamarck, 1819) - white miniature ark
- Barbatia foliata (Forsskål in Niebuhr, 1775)
- Barbatia fusca Bruguière
- Barbatia gabonensis Oliver & Cosel, 1993
- Barbatia gibba (Martin, 1879) †
- Barbatia gradata
- Barbatia grayana Dunker, 1867
- Barbatia hachijoensis Hatai, Niino & Kotaka in Niino, 1952
- Barbatia hawaia Dall, Bartsch & Rehder, 1938
- Barbatia illota (G. B. Sowerby I, 1833)
- Barbatia lacerata (Bruguière, 1789)
- Barbatia legumen (Lamy, 1907)
- Barbatia lurida (G. B. Sowerby I, 1833)
- Barbatia molokaia Dall, Bartsch & Rehder, 1938
- Barbatia novaezelandiae (E.A. Smith, 1915) - New Zealand ark
- Barbatia oahua Dall, Bartsch & Rehder, 1938
- Barbatia obliquata (Wood, 1828)
- Barbatia parva (G. B. Sowerby I, 1833)
- Barbatia parvivillosa (Iredale, 1939)
- Barbatia perinesa Oliver & Chesney, 1994
- Barbatia pistachia (Lamarck, 1819)
- Barbatia platei (Stempell, 1899)
- Barbatia plicata (Dillwyn, 1817)
- Barbatia pyrrhotus Oliver & Holmes, 2004
- Barbatia reeveana (d'Orbigny, 1846) - low-rib ark
- Barbatia revelata (Deshayes in Maillard, 1863)
- Barbatia scazon (Iredale, 1939, 1939)
- Barbatia sculpturata Turton, 1932
- Barbatia setigera (Reeve, 1844)
- Barbatia solidula Dunker, 1868
- Barbatia stearnsi (Pilsbry, 1895)
- Barbatia tenera (C. B. Adams, 1845) - delicate ark, doc bales ark
- Barbatia terebrans (Iredale, 1939, 1939)
- Barbatia trapezina (Lamarck, 1819)
- Barbatia virescens (Reeve, 1844)

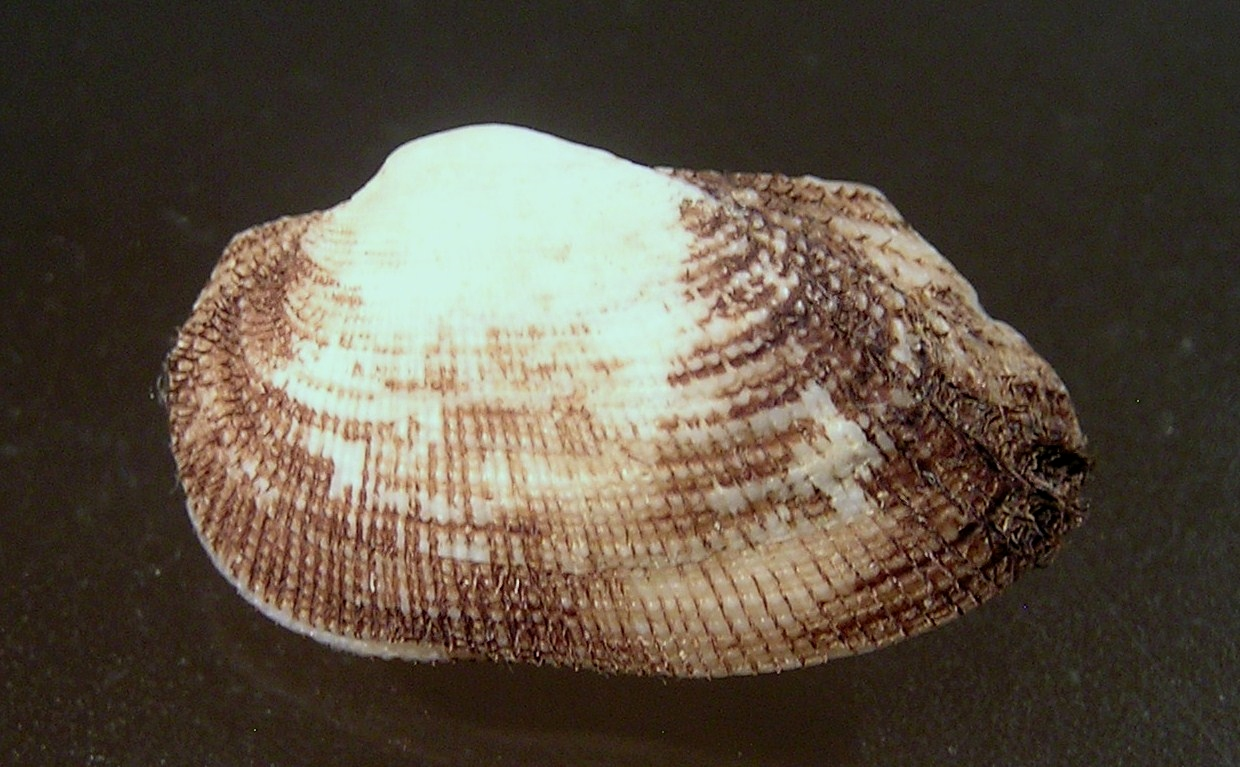
Barbatia trapezina

== Extinct species ==
Extinct species within the genus Barbatia include:

- †Barbatia aegyptiaca Fourtau 1917
- †Barbatia aspera Conrad 1854
- †Barbatia axinaea Boettger 1883
- †Barbatia carolinensis Conrad 1849
- †Barbatia consutilis Tate 1886
- †Barbatia corvamnis Harris 1946
- †Barbatia crustata Tate 1886
- †Barbatia culleni Dey 1961
- †Barbatia deusseni Gardner 1927
- †Barbatia dissimilis Tate 1886
- †Barbatia gibba Martin 1879
- †Barbatia helblingi Bruguière 1789
- †Barbatia inglisia Richards and Palmer 1953
- †Barbatia irregularis Cossmann and Pissaro 1906
- †Barbatia kayalensis Dey 1961
- †Barbatia legayi Rigaux and Sauvage 1868
- †Barbatia lignitifera Aldrich 1908
- †Barbatia limatella Tate 1886
- †Barbatia ludoviciana
- †Barbatia malaiana Martin 1917
- †Barbatia mauryae Olsson 1922
- †Barbatia merriami Van Winkle
- †Barbatia mytiloides (Brocchi, 1814)
- †Barbatia paradiagona Dockery 1982
- †Barbatia pistachia Lamarck 1819
- †Barbatia pumila Tate 1886
- †Barbatia quilonensis Dey 1961
- †Barbatia rembangensis Martin 1910
- †Barbatia seraperta Harris 1946
- †Barbatia simulans Tate 1886
- †Barbatia subtrigonalis Martin 1883
- †Barbatia sundaiana Martin 1916
- †Barbatia uxorispalmeri Stenzel and E. K. 1957
- †Barbatia wendti Lamy 1950
