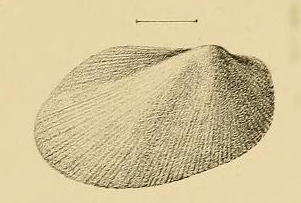
- Gulf of Oman, 24° 58' N, 56° 54' E, 156 fathoms, on shell sand

Scientific classification
- Domain: Eukaryota
- Kingdom: Animalia
- Phylum: Mollusca
- Class: Bivalvia
- Order: Arcida
- Family: Arcidae
- Genus: Bentharca; Verrill & Bush, 1898

Type species
- Bentharca asperula Dall, 1881

= Bentharca =

Bentharca Temporal range: 23.03–Recent Ma

Genus of ark clam

Bentharca is a genus of ark clams. Fossil species placed in the genus have been identified from the lower Miocene (23.03 mya).

== Species ==
It contains 2 extant species, and 2 extinct species.

- Bentharca asperula (Dall, 1881)
- Bentharca avellanaria (Melvill & Standen, 1907)
- †Bentharca inexpectata (P. A. Maxwell, 1966)
- †Bentharca waitakarensis Eagle, 2000
