= Palestinarca =

Palestinarca Temporal range: Aptian

Scientific classification
- Domain: Eukaryota
- Kingdom: Animalia
- Phylum: Mollusca
- Class: Bivalvia
- Order: Arcida
- Family: Arcidae
- Genus: †Palestinarca; Vokes, 1946

Type species
- Palestinarca palestina

Extinct genus of ark clams

Palestinarca is an extinct genus of ark clams that inhabited the Tethys Ocean in what is now Lebanon during the Aptian stage of the Early Cretaceous epoch. It is known from the species P. palestina.
