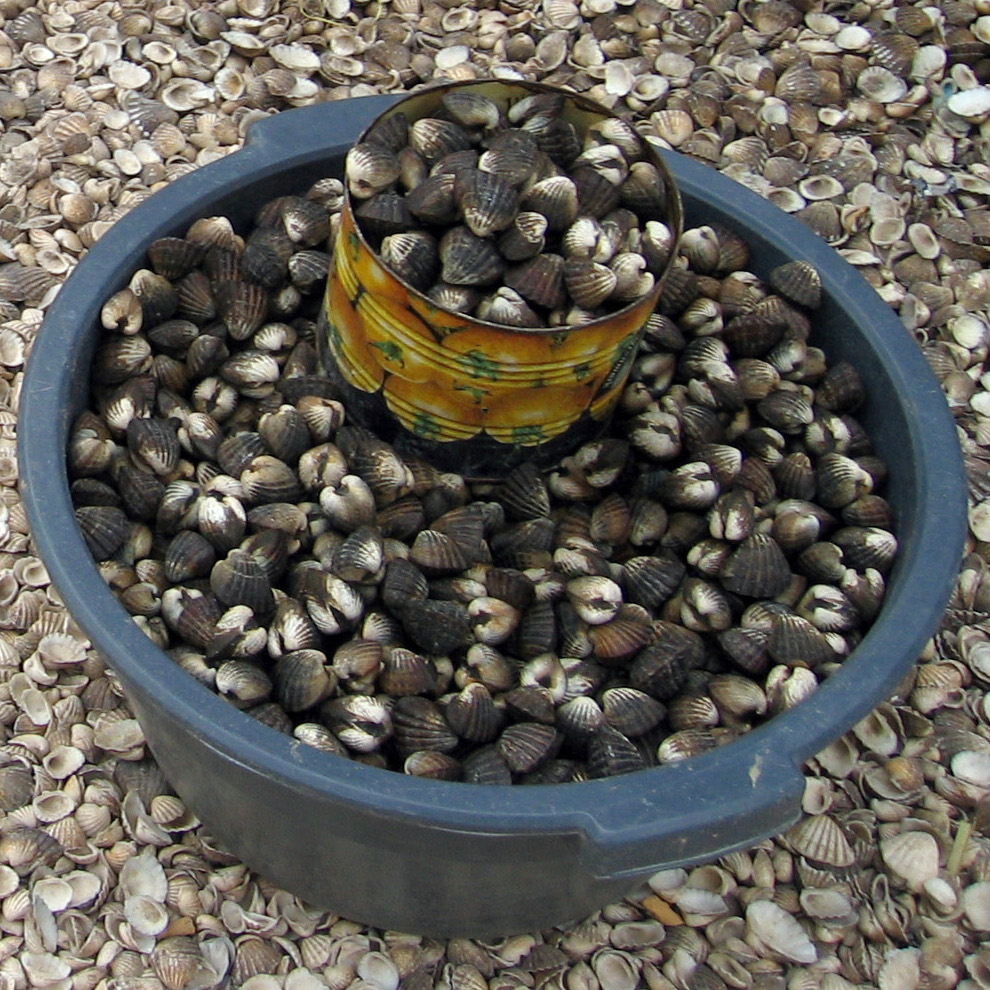
- Live Senilia senilis for sale in Fadiouth, Senegal
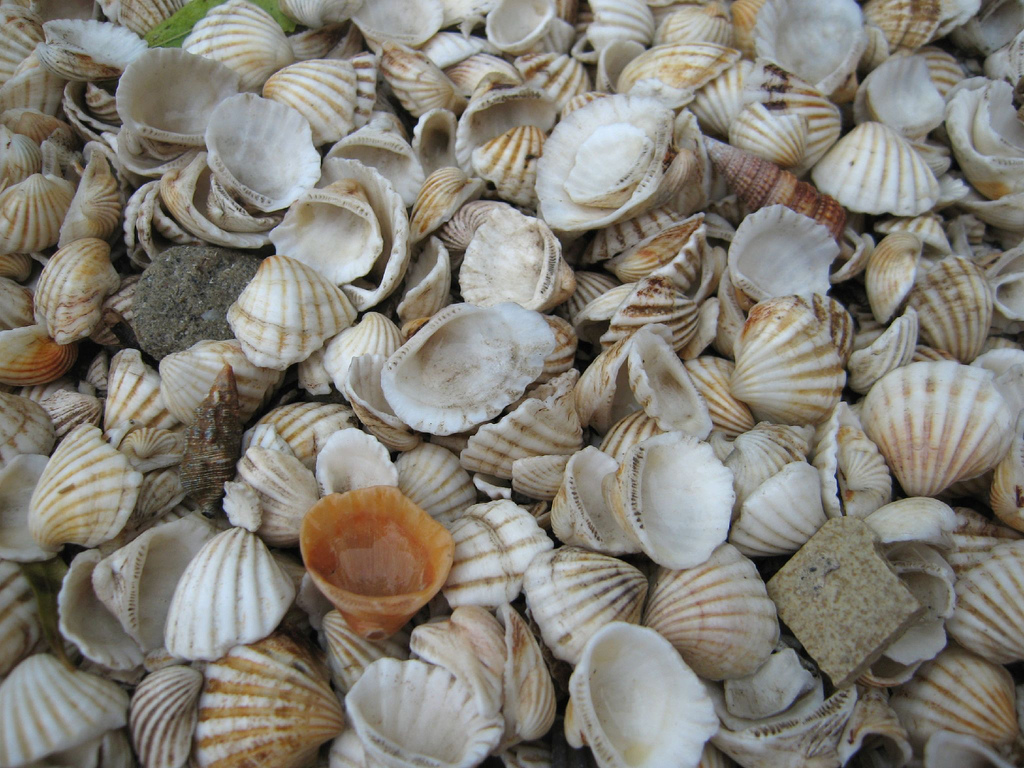
- Single valves of Senilia senilis (plus two gastropods) washed up on the beach at Fadiouth, Senegal

Scientific classification
- Kingdom: Animalia
- Phylum: Mollusca
- Class: Bivalvia
- Order: Arcida
- Family: Arcidae
- Genus: Senilia; Gray, 1842
- Species: S. senilis

Binomial name
- Senilia senilis Linnaeus, 1758

Synonyms
- Anadara senilis (Linnaeus, 1758)

= Senilia =

Genus of bivalves

Senilia is a genus of edible saltwater clams, marine bivalve molluscs in the family Arcidae, the ark shells. It contains a single species, Senilia senilis.

Right and left valve of the same specimen:

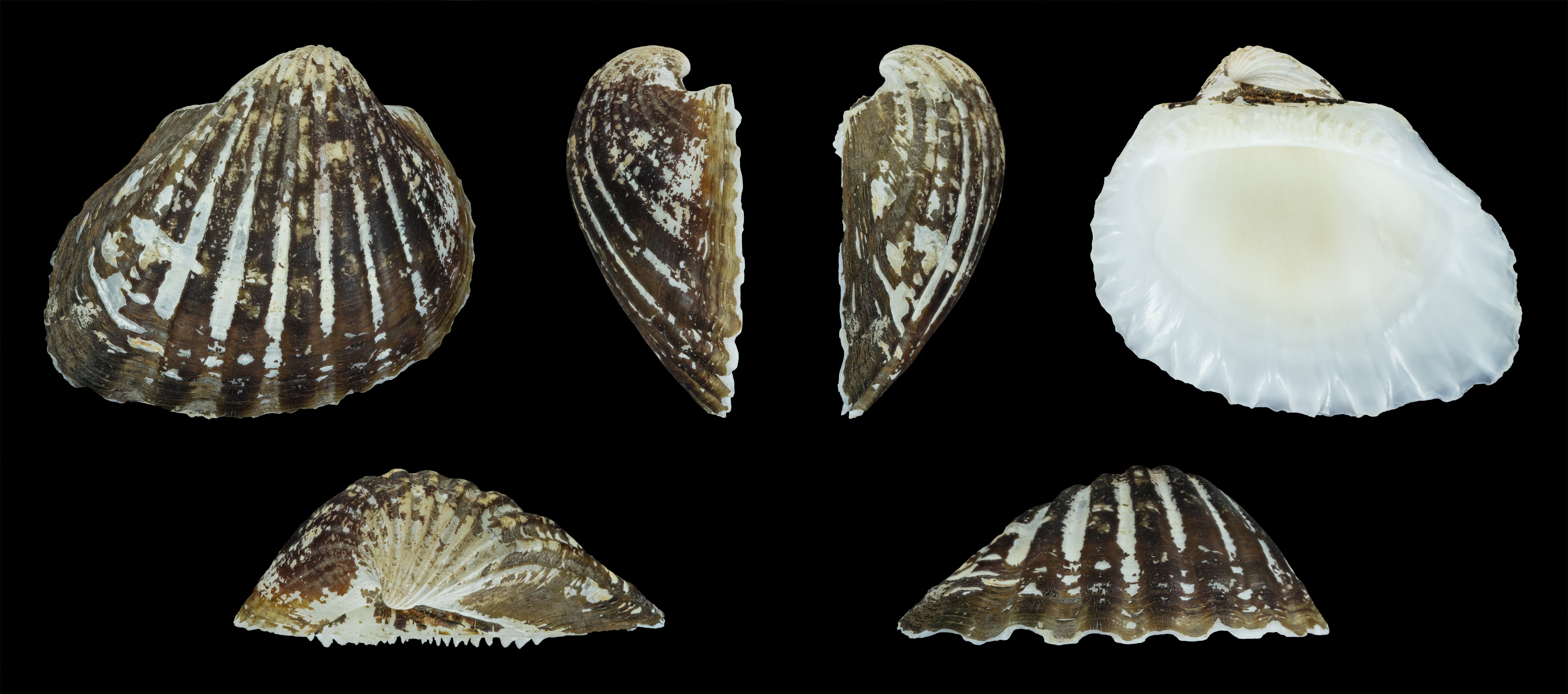
Right valve

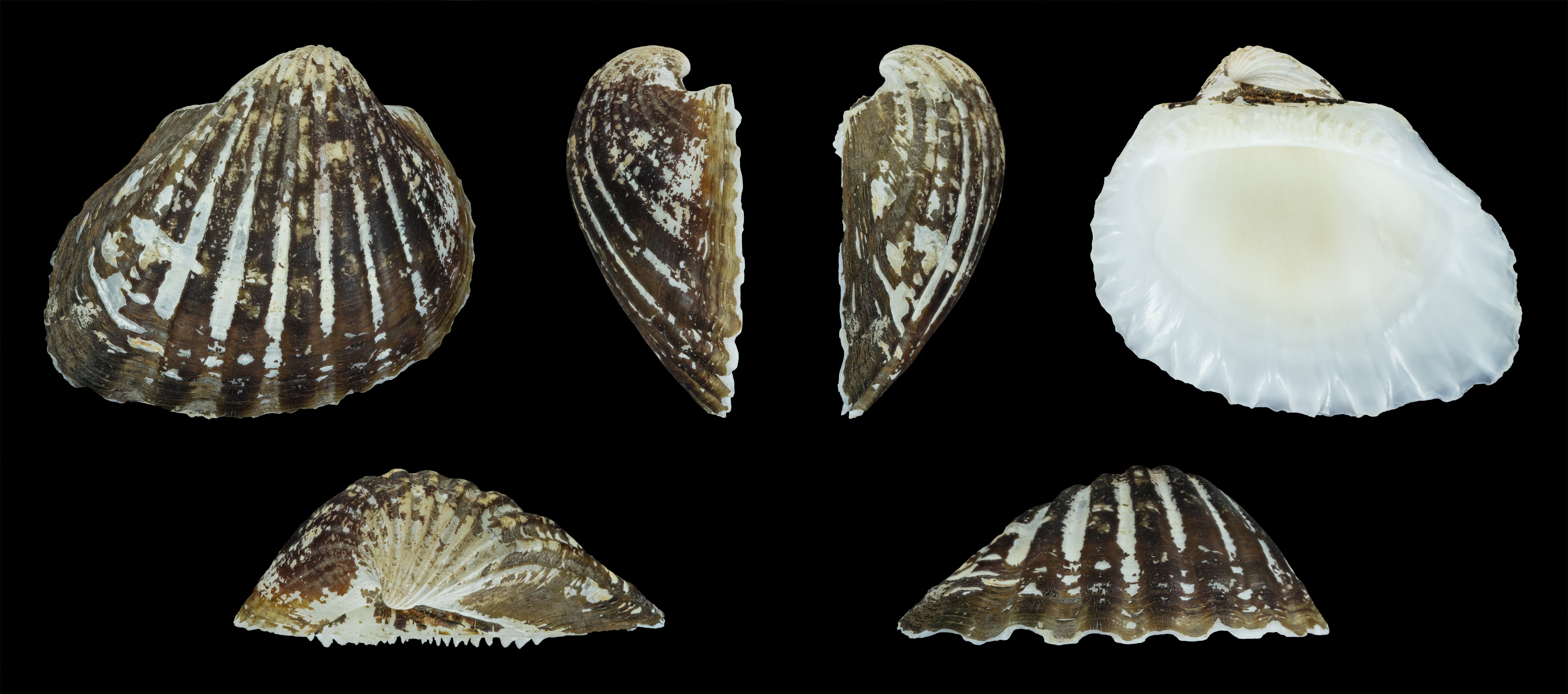
Left valve
