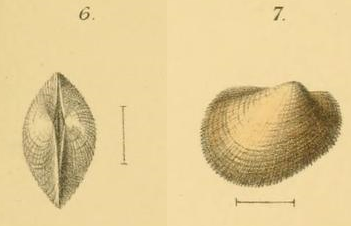
- Bathyarca pectunculoides

Scientific classification
- Kingdom: Animalia
- Phylum: Mollusca
- Class: Bivalvia
- Order: Arcida
- Family: Arcidae
- Genus: Bathyarca; Kobelt, 1891

= Bathyarca =

Genus of bivalves

Bathyarca is a genus of bivalves belonging to the family Arcidae.

The genus has cosmopolitan distribution.

== Species ==
Species:

- Bathyarca adelaideana (Iredale, 1929)
- Bathyarca anaclima (Melvill & Standen, 1907)
- Bathyarca bellatula Marwick, 1942
- Bathyarca pectunculoides (Scacchi, 1835)
