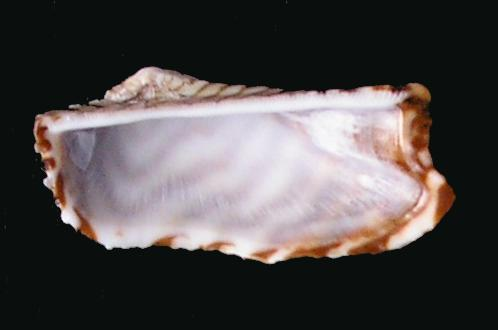
- Internal view of a valve of Arca zebra

Scientific classification
- Kingdom: Animalia
- Phylum: Mollusca
- Class: Bivalvia
- Order: Arcida
- Family: Arcidae
- Genus: Arca; Linnaeus, 1758

Species
- 23 described species

= Arca (bivalve) =

Arca Temporal range: Jurassic–Recent

Genus of bivalves

Arca is a genus of edible saltwater clams in the family Arcidae, the Ark Clams.

== Description ==
As is typical for ark clams, species in this genus have a long, straight hinge line. Some species in this genus, such as Arca zebra and Arca noae, have a brown-and-white striped pattern. Arca attach themselves to rock with byssal threads which protrude through a gap on the ventral (open) side.

== Species ==
Species within the genus Arca include:

- Arca acuminata Krauss, 1848
- Arca angulata King & Broderip, 1832
- Arca avellana Lamarck, 1819 - hazelnut ark
- Arca boucardi Jousseaume, 1894 - Kobelt's ark
- Arca bouvieri Fischer, 1874
- Arca despecta Fischer, 1876
- Arca imbricata Bruguière, 1789 - mossy ark
- Arca kauaia (Dall, Bartsch & Rehder, 1938)
- Arca koumaci Lutaenko & Maestrati, 2007
- Arca maculata Sowerby
- Arca mauia
- Arca mutabilis (Sowerby I, 1833) - changeable ark
- Arca navicularis Bruguière, 1789 - Indo-pacific ark
- Arca noae Linnaeus, 1758 - Noah's ark
- Arca ocellata Reeve, 1844
- Arca pacifica (Sowerby I, 1833) - Panamic turkey wing
- Arca patriarchalis Röding, 1798
- Arca reticulata Gmelin, 1791
- Arca tetragona Poli, 1795 - four-sided ark
- Arca truncata Sowerby
- Arca turbatrix Oliver & Cosel, 1993
- Arca ventricosa Lamarck, 1819 - ventricose ark
- Arca volucris Reeve, 1844
- Arca zebra (Swainson, 1833) - Atlantic turkey wing
