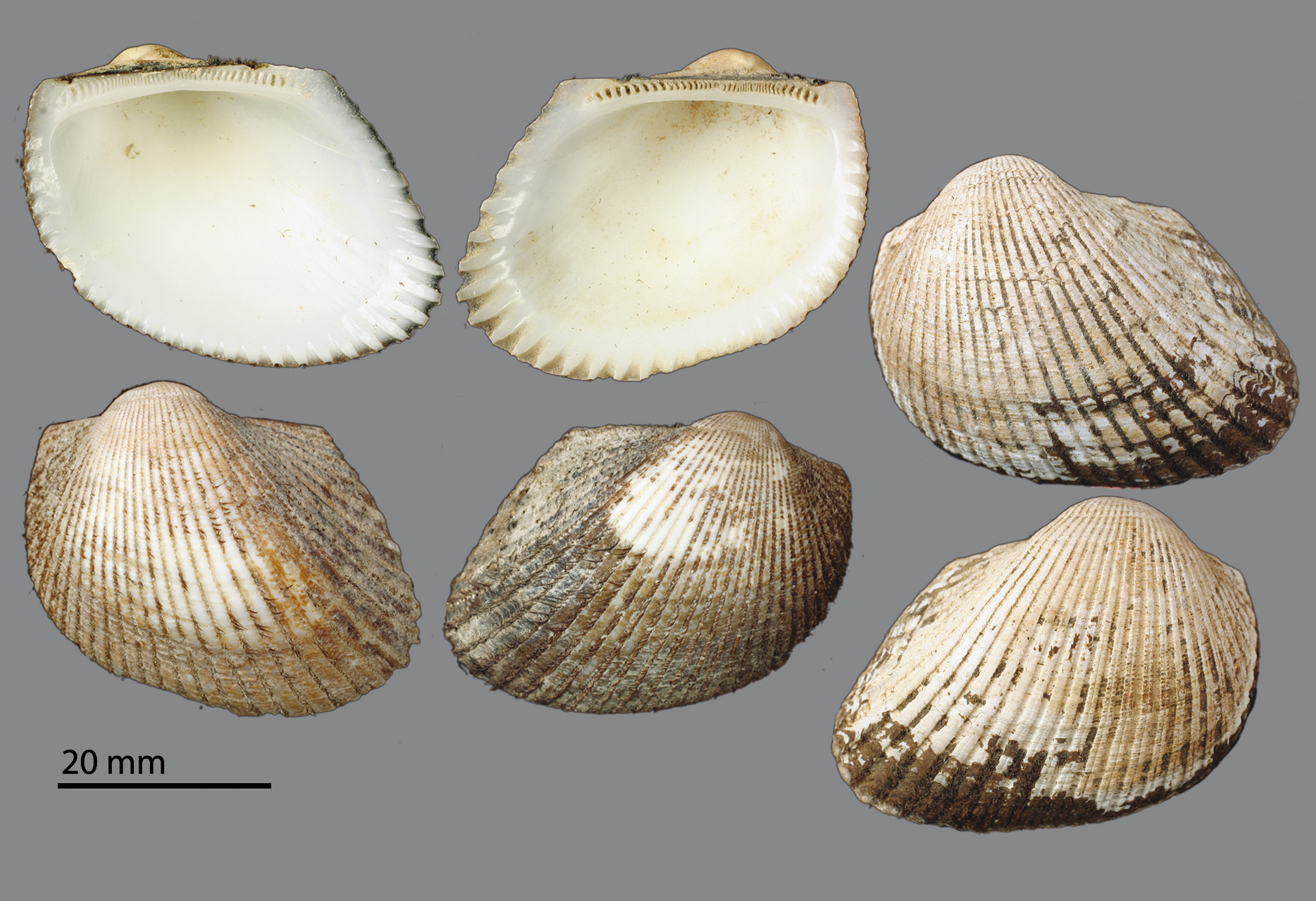
- Shell specimens of Anadara antiquata

Scientific classification
- Kingdom: Animalia
- Phylum: Mollusca
- Class: Bivalvia
- Order: Arcida
- Superfamily: Arcoidea
- Family: Arcidae; Lamarck, 1809

Genera
- See text

= Ark clam =

Family of molluscs

Ark clam is the common name for a family of small to large-sized saltwater clams or marine bivalve molluscs in the family Arcidae. Generally less than 80 mm long, ark clams vary both in shape and size. They number about 200 species worldwide.

The group is known as "ark shells" because species such as Arca have a large flat area between the umbones which, in an undamaged shell, somewhat resembles a deck, with the rest of the shell perhaps illustrating an ancient wooden boat such as Noah's Ark is thought to have been.

The thick, ridged shells of ark clams are often white, cream or tan, but in some species, the shell is striped with, tinted with, or completely colored, a rich brown. In life the shell of most species has a top shell layer that is thick brown periostracum affixed to the harder calcareous part of the shell. In some species such as Barbatia, this outer horny covering is tufted at the end of the shell into something that resembles a beard, hence the name Barbatia or bearded one. The thick outer skin or periostracum of an ark clam can act as camouflage, such that the shells can sometimes look like stones when lying on the bottom.

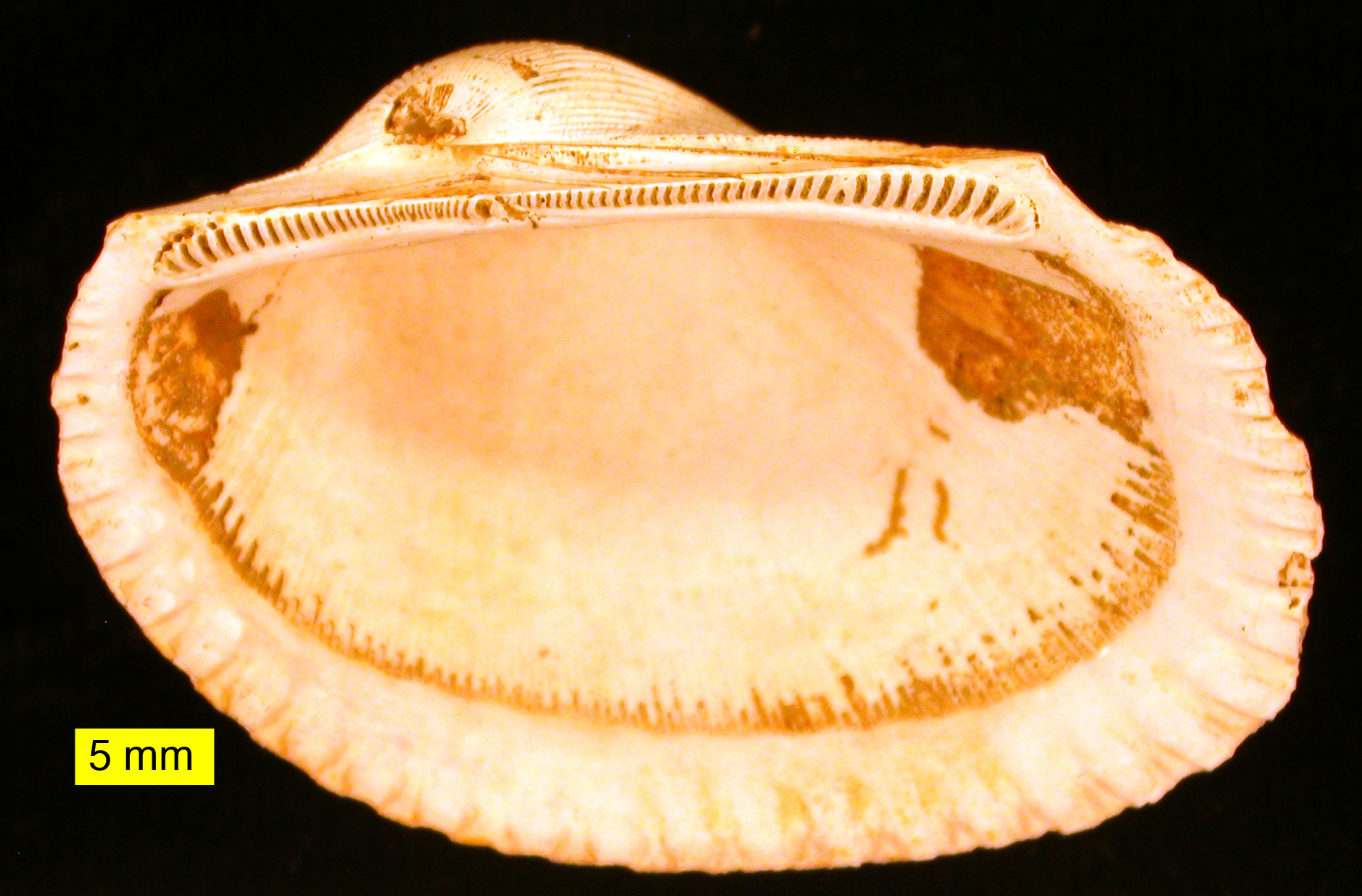
One fossil valve of Anadara from Cyprus, dating to the Pliocene Epoch of the geologic timescale, approx. 5.3-2.5 million years BP

All ark shells have a long straight hinge line with a single row of numerous small and unspecialized "teeth". This is known as a "taxodont dentition" and represents an ancient ancestor. This kind of hinge line is also found in the bivalve families Glycymerididae, Nuculidae and Nuculanidae.

Ark clams are distinct from other clams in having red blood pigments (hemoglobin) that facilitate the transport of oxygen to their tissues and enable them to inhabit more hypoxic environments.

Ark clams reach reproductive maturity when they are about twelve months old and about 20 mm long. The spawning cycle typically begins in the rainy season. Ark Clams are broadcast spawners, that is, eggs and sperm are released into open water where fertilization occurs. The fertilized eggs develop rapidly into planktonic larvae that drift with ocean currents for eight to ten days during which 99.9% of the larvae are consumed or perish. Eventually the survivors settle to suitable sites of the sea floor where they develop into juvenile clams. Only one percent of these juveniles will survive to become a mature adult. Ark Clams have a maximum life span of about six years.

== Human use ==
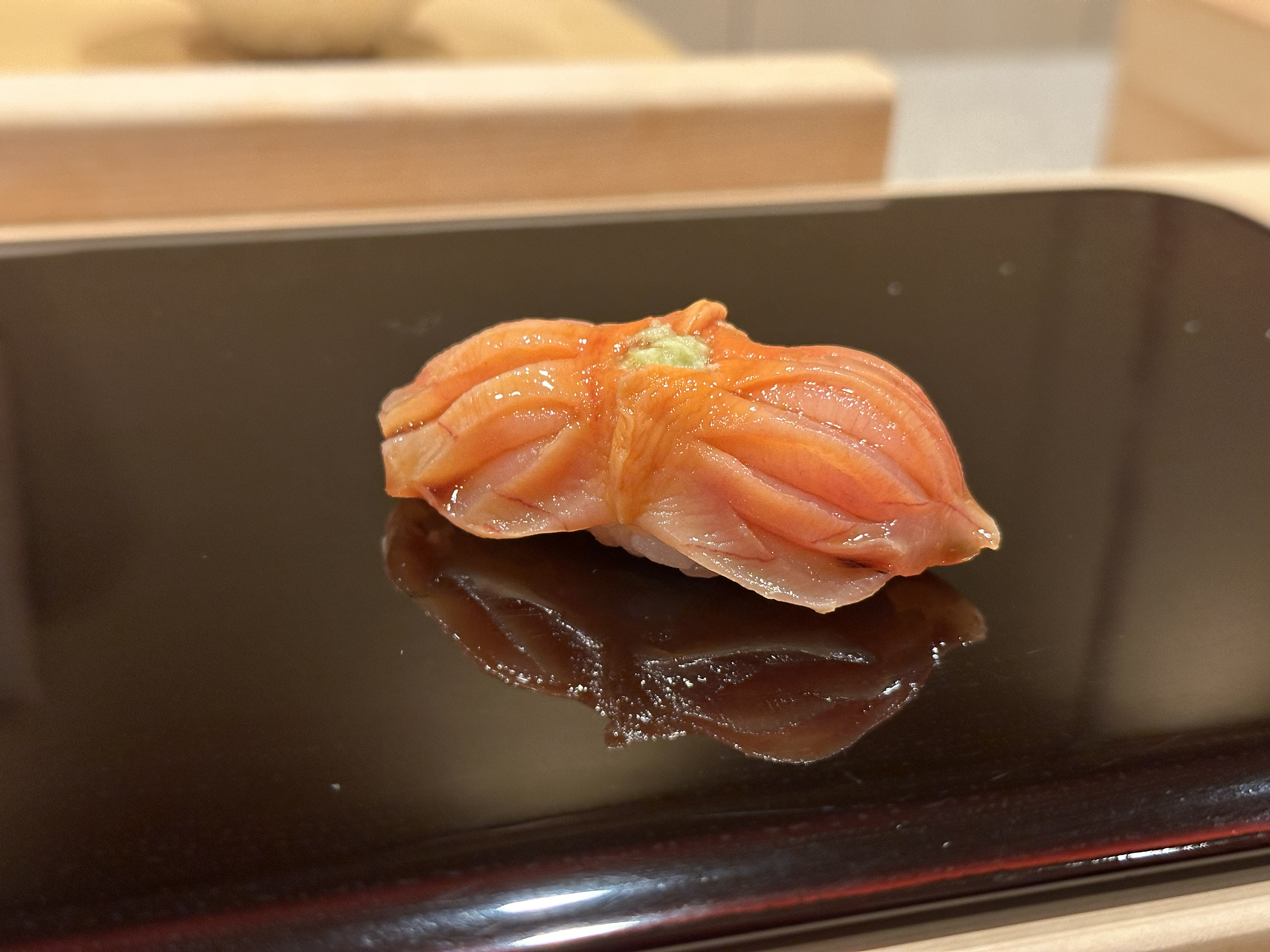
Japanese akagai (Anadara broughtonii) served as sushi

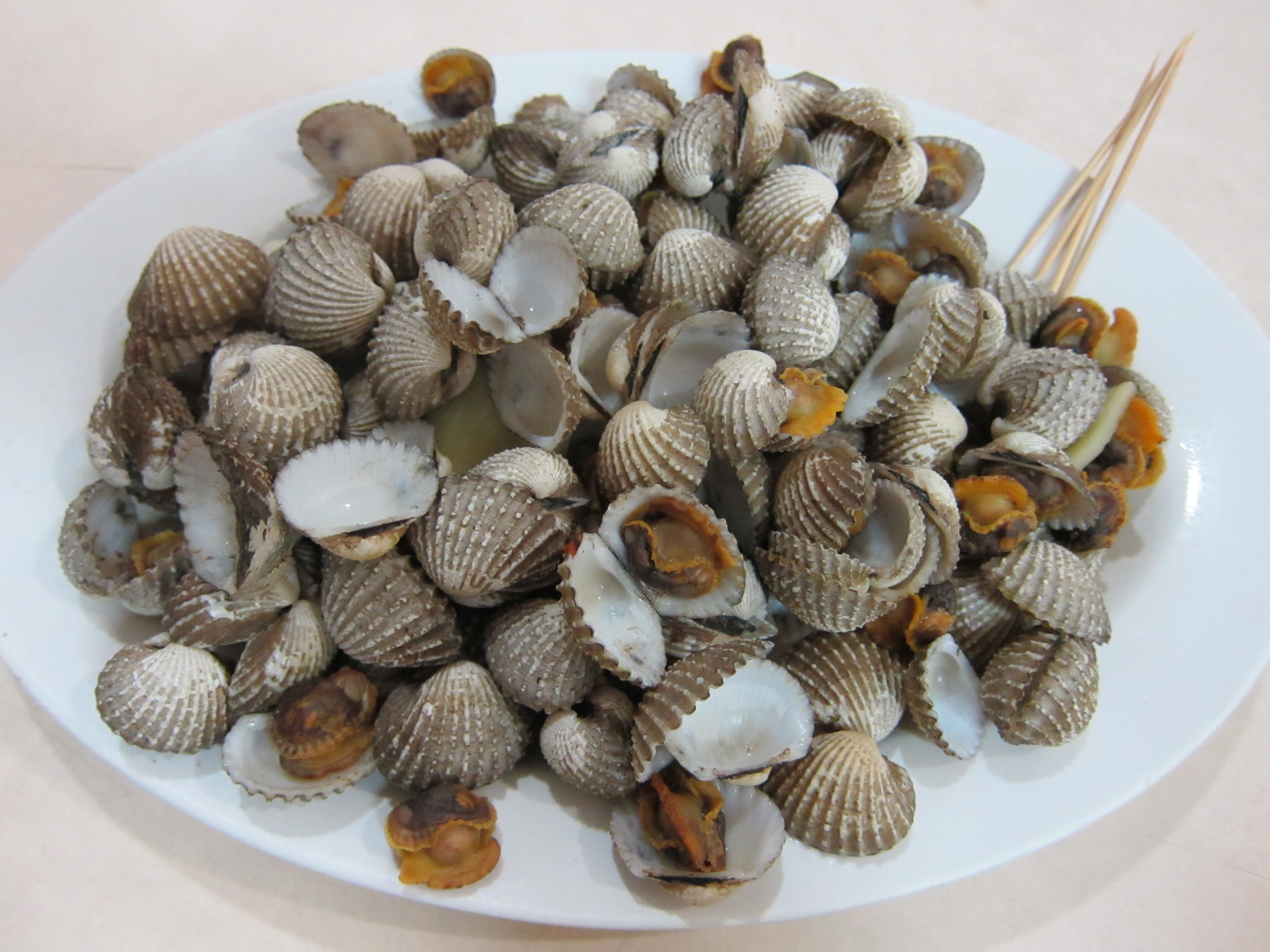
Boiled ark clams served in Tanjong Pagar, Singapore

Ark clams are edible mollusks that have been consumed since pre-historic times and are still consumed today. Numerous recipes for ark clams have been published. Recreational foragers should follow seafood safety guidelines and shellfish harvesting restrictions, and should be aware of any harmful algal blooms that may contaminate shellfish with biotoxins. Shellfish collected in urban areas should not be eaten raw.

Tegillarca granosa was used as a food by Indigenous peoples living on the northern Australian coastline through at least the past ~4500 years, with extensive evidence preserved in the form of shell mound sites. Large ark clams, such as Arca zebra, are commonly used as bait, as well as food, throughout the Caribbean. In Japan, red Ark clams, called Akagai, are used in sushi or sashimi. Some ark clams species, such as the blood cockle (Anadara granosa, a.k.a. Tegillarca granosa) are raised in aquaculture, e.g. in the estuaries of China's Fujian coast. In the U.S. limited quantities of wild ark clams have been harvested in North Carolina and Virginia for ethnic markets and aquaculture has been explored.

In the south Pacific region, Ark clams are still gathered by indigenous people as an important subsistence food. Ark clams are harvested, mostly by women, by gleaning intertidal zones. To maintain the Ark Clam fishery, several communities in Fiji are imposing a minimum size limit of 3 cm, closures during spawning periods, and establishing "no-take" areas.

== Genera ==
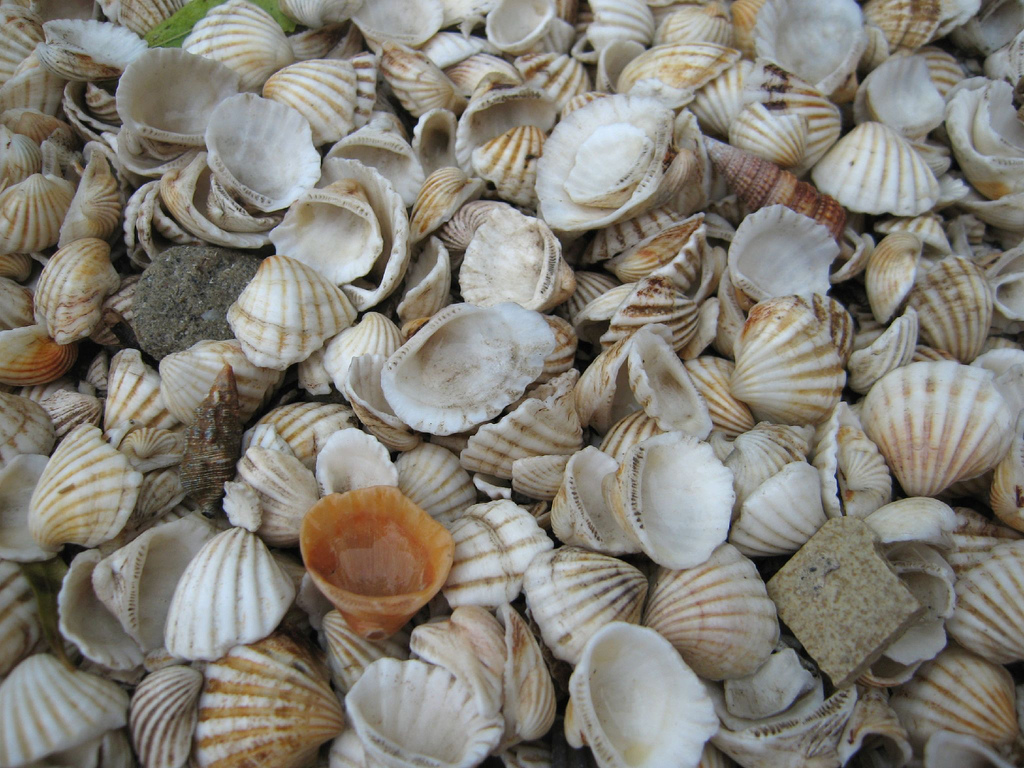
Numerous valves of arcids, genus Senilia, washed up on the beach in Senegal

Genera within the family Arcidae include:

- Acar Gray, 1857
- Anadara Gray, 1847
- Arca Linnaeus, 1758
- Barbatia Gray, 1847
- Bathyarca Kobelt, 1891
- Bentharca Verrill and Bush, 1898
- Larkinia Reinhart, 1935
- Samacar Iredale, 1936
- Senilia Linnaeus, 1758
- Tegillarca Iredale, 1939
- Palestinarca†
