= Spiny jewel box =

Spiny jewel box is a name for several small clams in the genus Arcinella, especially:

- Arcinella arcinella, the Caribbean spiny jewel box
- Arcinella cornuta, the spiny jewel box, or Florida spiny jewel box
