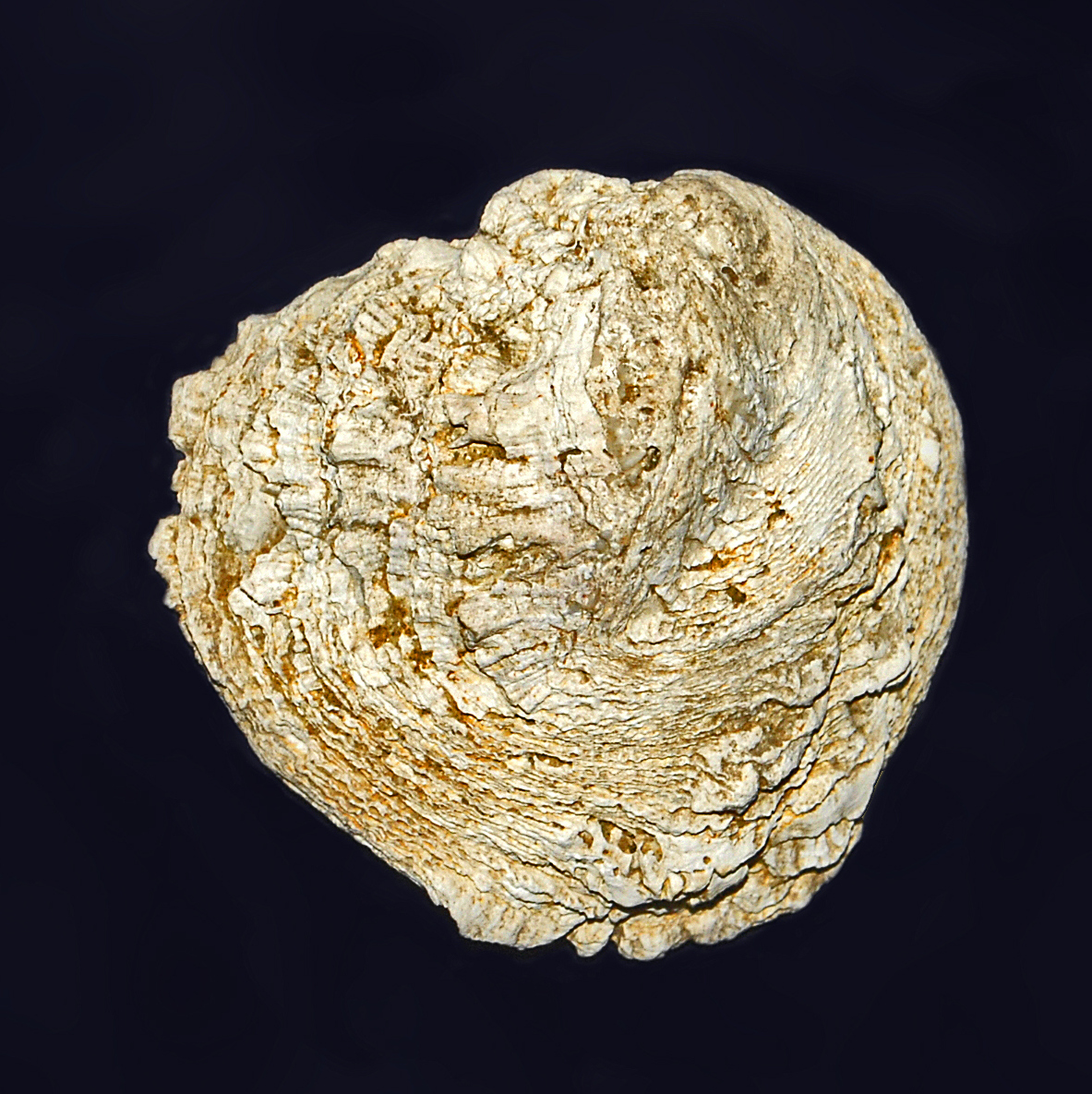
- Fossil valve of Pseudochama gryphina from Pliocene of Italy

Scientific classification
- Kingdom: Animalia
- Phylum: Mollusca
- Class: Bivalvia
- Order: Venerida
- Superfamily: Chamoidea
- Family: Chamidae
- Genus: Pseudochama
- Species: P. gryphina

Binomial name
- Pseudochama gryphina (Lamarck, 1819)

= Pseudochama gryphina =

Pseudochama gryphina Temporal range: Eocene – Present

Species of bivalve

Pseudochama gryphina is a species of bivalve mollusc in the family Chamidae. This species can be found in the Mediterranean Sea and on coasts of Angola and surroundings.

Right and left valve of the same specimen:

Right valve

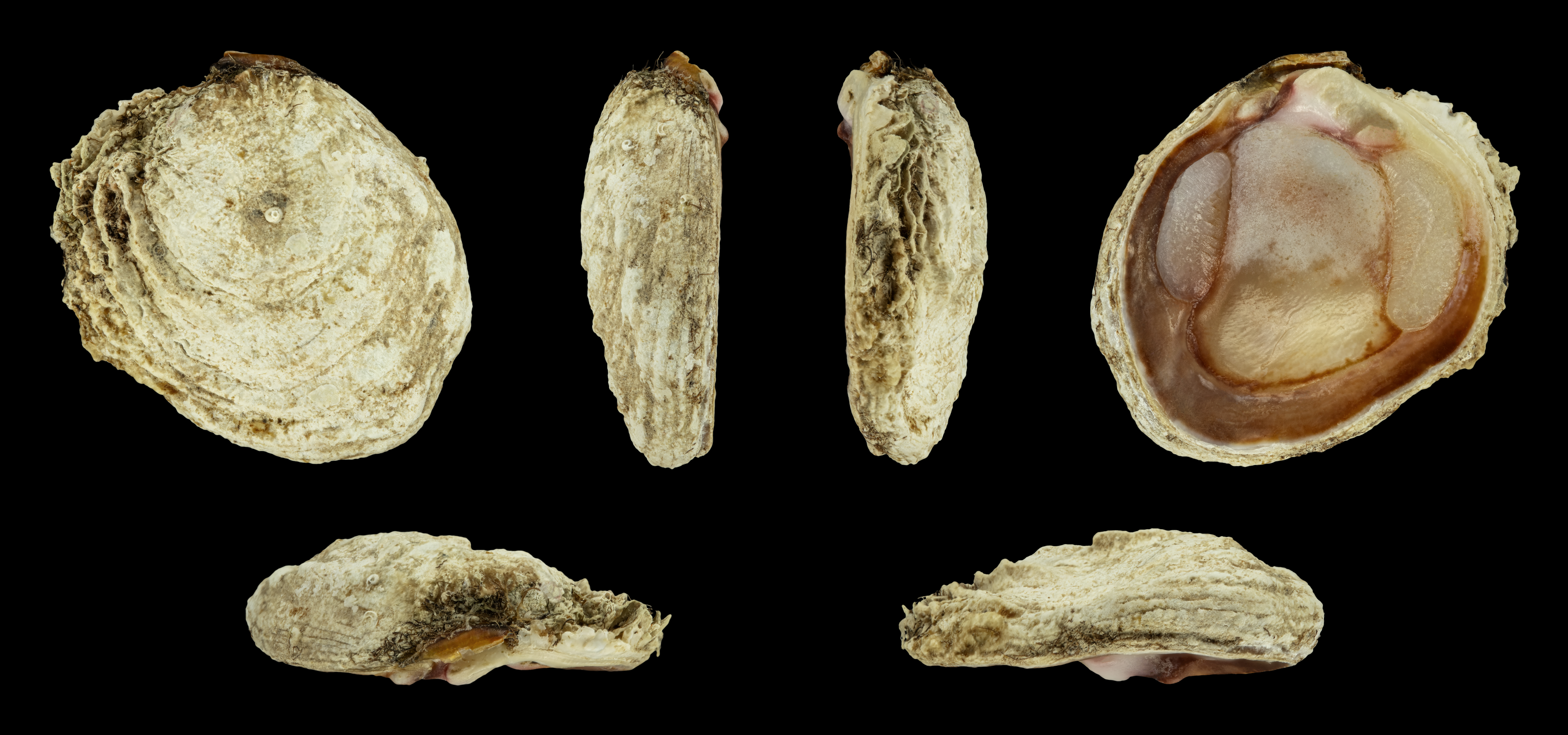
Left valve

== Fossil records ==
The genus Pseudochama is known from the Eocene to the Recent periods (age range: from 40.4 to 0.0 million years ago).
