= Chama sarda =

Scientific classification
- Kingdom: Animalia
- Phylum: Mollusca
- Class: Bivalvia
- Order: Venerida
- Superfamily: Chamoidea
- Family: Chamidae
- Genus: Chama
- Species: C. sarda

Binomial name
- Chama sarda Reeve, 1847

Species of bivalve

Chama sarda, or the Cherry jewel box clam, is a species of bivalve mollusc in the family Chamidae. It can be found along the Atlantic coast of North America, ranging from southern Florida to the West Indies.
