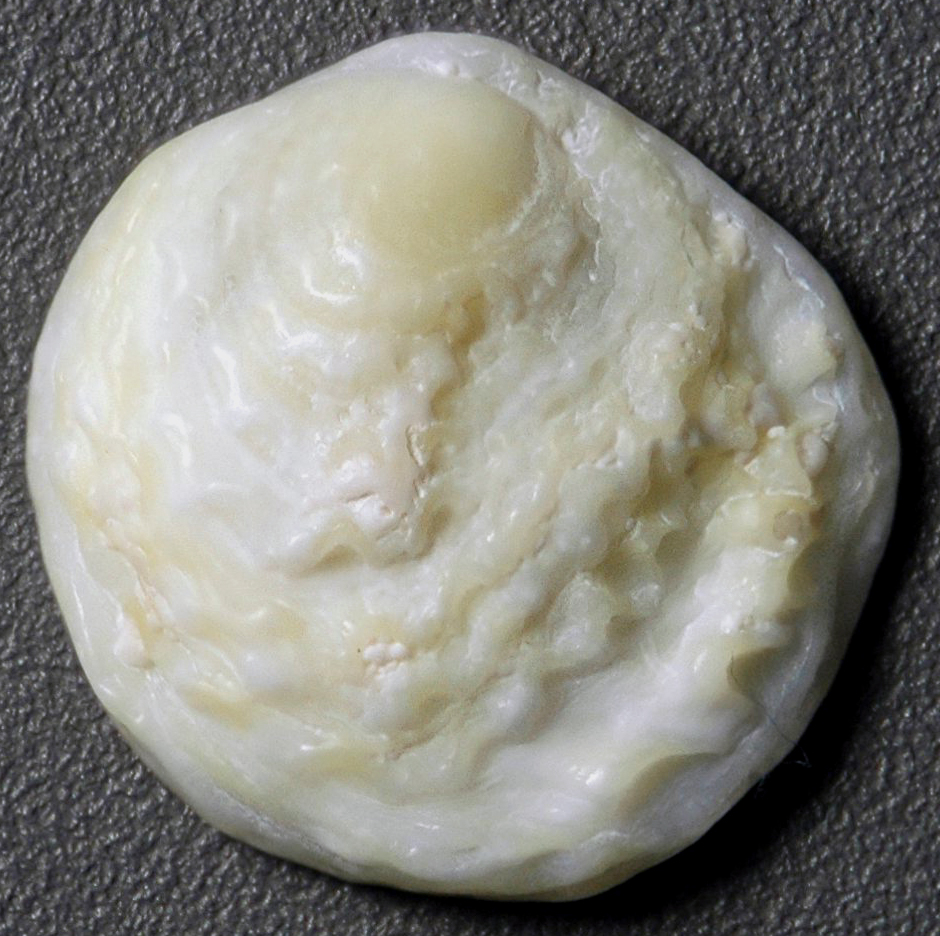
- Exterior of a beachworn right valve, 1.2 cm across at its widest

Scientific classification
- Kingdom: Animalia
- Phylum: Mollusca
- Class: Bivalvia
- Order: Venerida
- Superfamily: Chamoidea
- Family: Chamidae
- Genus: Chama
- Species: C. macerophylla

Binomial name
- Chama macerophylla Gmelin, 1791

= Chama macerophylla =

Species of bivalve

Chama macerophylla, or the leafy jewel box clam, is a species of bivalve mollusc in the family Chamidae.

== Distribution ==
"It can be found along the Atlantic coast of North America, ranging from North Carolina to the West Indies."

Chama macerophylla var. sulphurea

Right and left valve of the same specimen:

Right valve

Left valve
