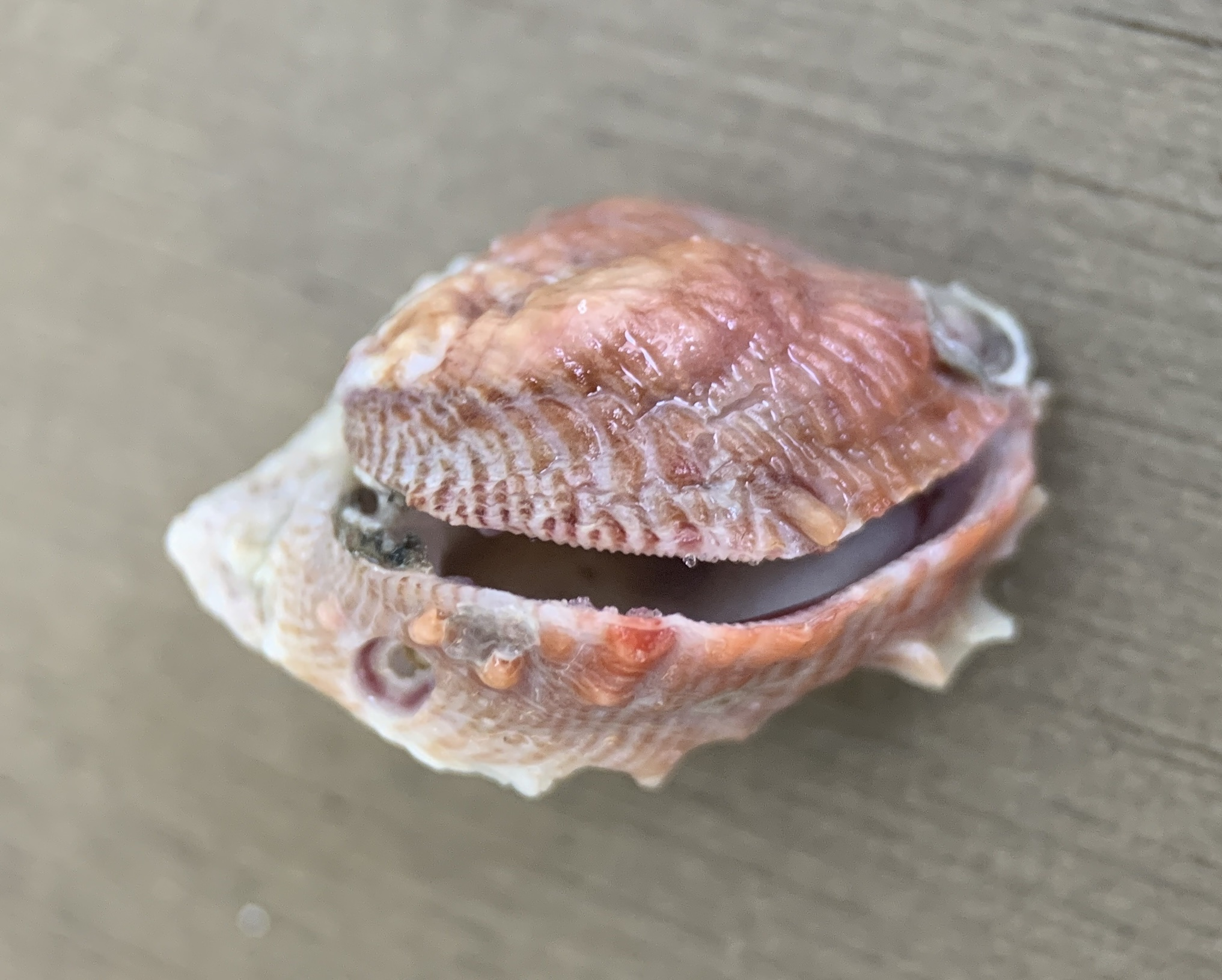

Scientific classification
- Kingdom: Animalia
- Phylum: Mollusca
- Class: Bivalvia
- Order: Venerida
- Superfamily: Chamoidea
- Family: Chamidae
- Genus: Chama
- Species: C. congregata

Binomial name
- Chama congregata Conrad, 1833

= Chama congregata =

Species of bivalve

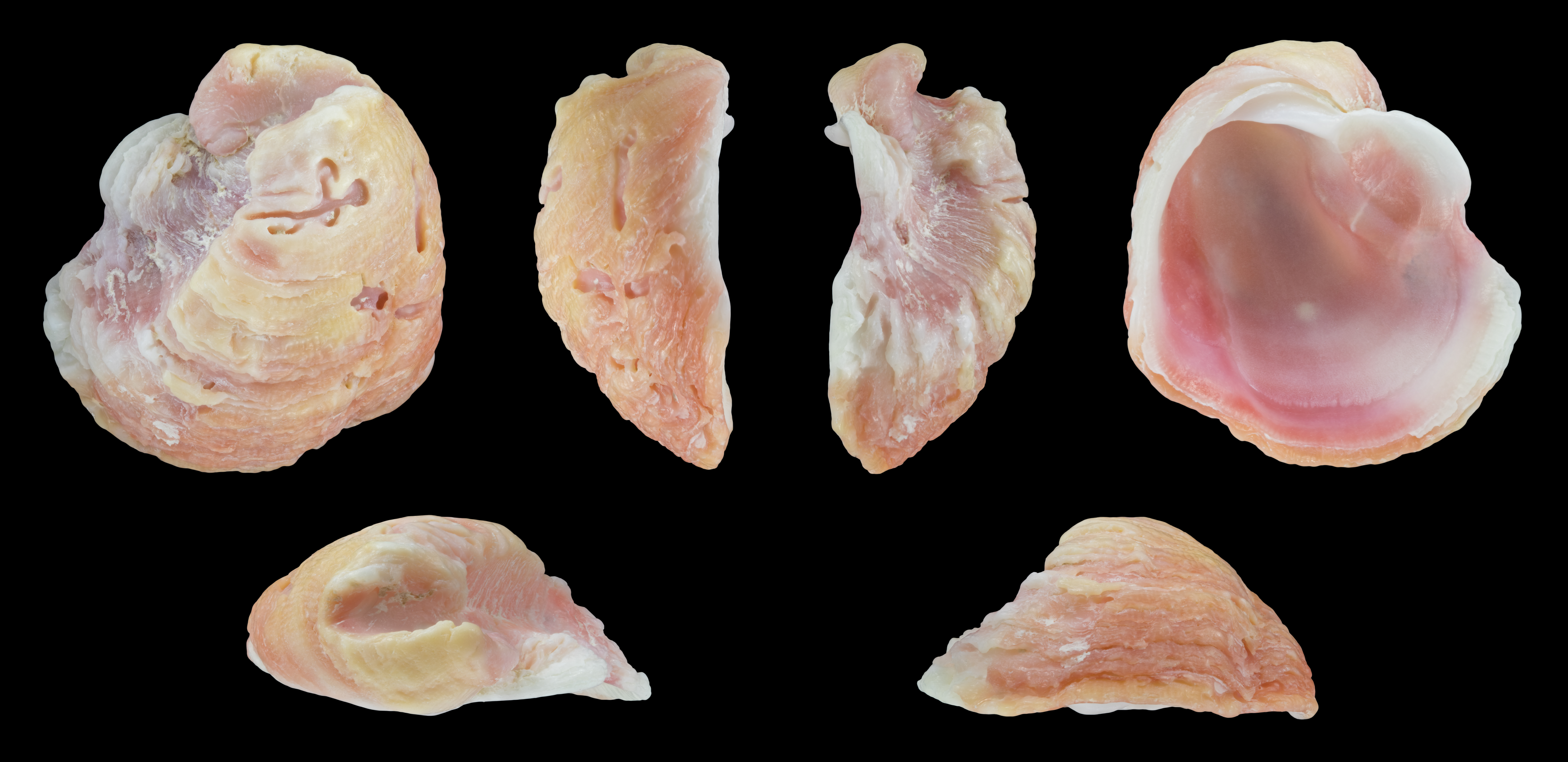
Left valve

Chama congregata, commonly known as the corrugated jewel box clam, is a species of bivalve mollusc in the family Chamidae. It can be found along the Atlantic coast of North America, ranging from North Carolina to the West Indies and Bermuda.
