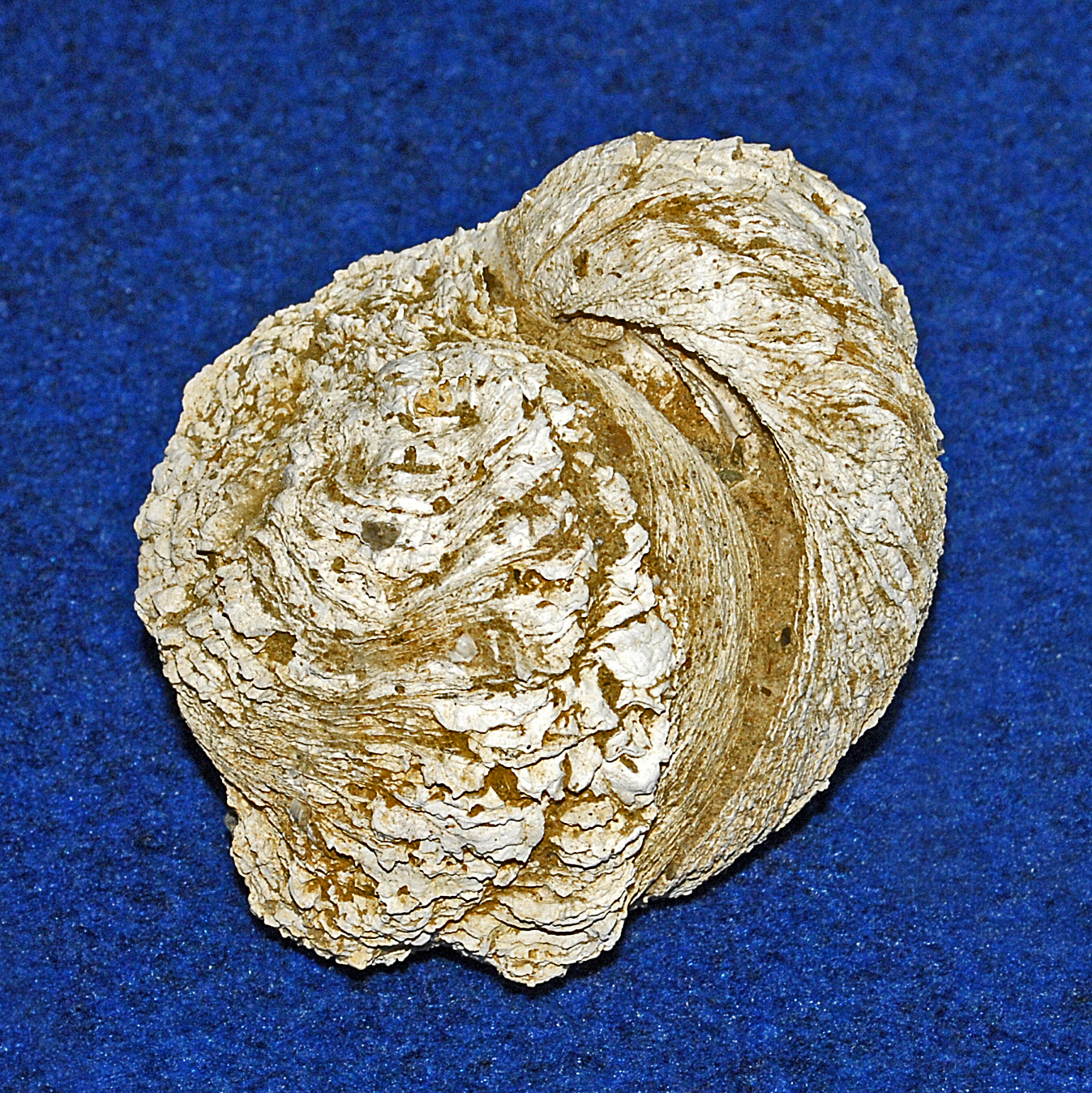
- Fossil shell of Chama gryphoides

Scientific classification
- Kingdom: Animalia
- Phylum: Mollusca
- Class: Bivalvia
- Order: Venerida
- Family: Chamidae
- Genus: Chama
- Species: C. gryphoides

Binomial name
- Chama gryphoides Linnaeus, 1758

= Chama gryphoides =

Chama gryphoides Temporal range: Miocene – Present

Species of bivalve

Chama gryphoides is a species of cemented saltwater clam, a marine bivalve mollusc in the family Chamidae, the jewel boxes.

This species is known in the fossil record from the Miocene to the Quaternary (age range 20.43 to 0.781 million years ago.). Fossil shells of this species have been found in Italy, Spain, United Kingdom, Algeria, Austria, Bulgaria, Cyprus, France, Germany, Greece, Hungary, Moldova, Morocco, Poland, Romania and Slovakia.

== Description ==
Shells of Chama gryphoides can reach a size of 20–28 millimetres (0.79–1.10 in). These shells are thick, heavy, almost oval and inequivalve. The left valve is large and deep, while the right one is flatter. The radial ribs are quite irregular and arranged in concentric rows.

== Distribution ==
This species has a Mediterranean distribution. It can be found at depths of 10 to 200 m.
