= Pseudochama cristella =

Scientific classification
- Kingdom: Animalia
- Phylum: Mollusca
- Class: Bivalvia
- Order: Venerida
- Superfamily: Chamoidea
- Family: Chamidae
- Genus: Pseudochama
- Species: P. cristella

Binomial name
- Pseudochama cristella (Lamarck, 1819)

Species of bivalve

Pseudochama cristella, or the left-handed jewel box clam, is a species of bivalve mollusc in the family Chamidae. It can be found along the Atlantic coast of North America, ranging from southern Florida to the West Indies.
