= C. sinuosa =

C. sinuosa may refer to:

- Colpomenia sinuosa, a brown alga species
- Chama sinuosa, the smooth-edged jewel box, a bivalve mollusc species
