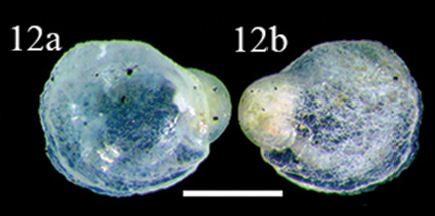

Scientific classification
- Kingdom: Animalia
- Phylum: Mollusca
- Class: Bivalvia
- Order: Venerida
- Superfamily: Chamoidea
- Family: Chamidae
- Genus: Chama
- Species: C. sinuosa

Binomial name
- Chama sinuosa Broderip, 1835

= Chama sinuosa =

Species of bivalve

Chama sinuosa, common name the smooth-edged jewel box, is a species of bivalve mollusc in the family Chamidae, the jewel boxes. This species is found along the Atlantic coast of North America, from southern Florida to the West Indies.
