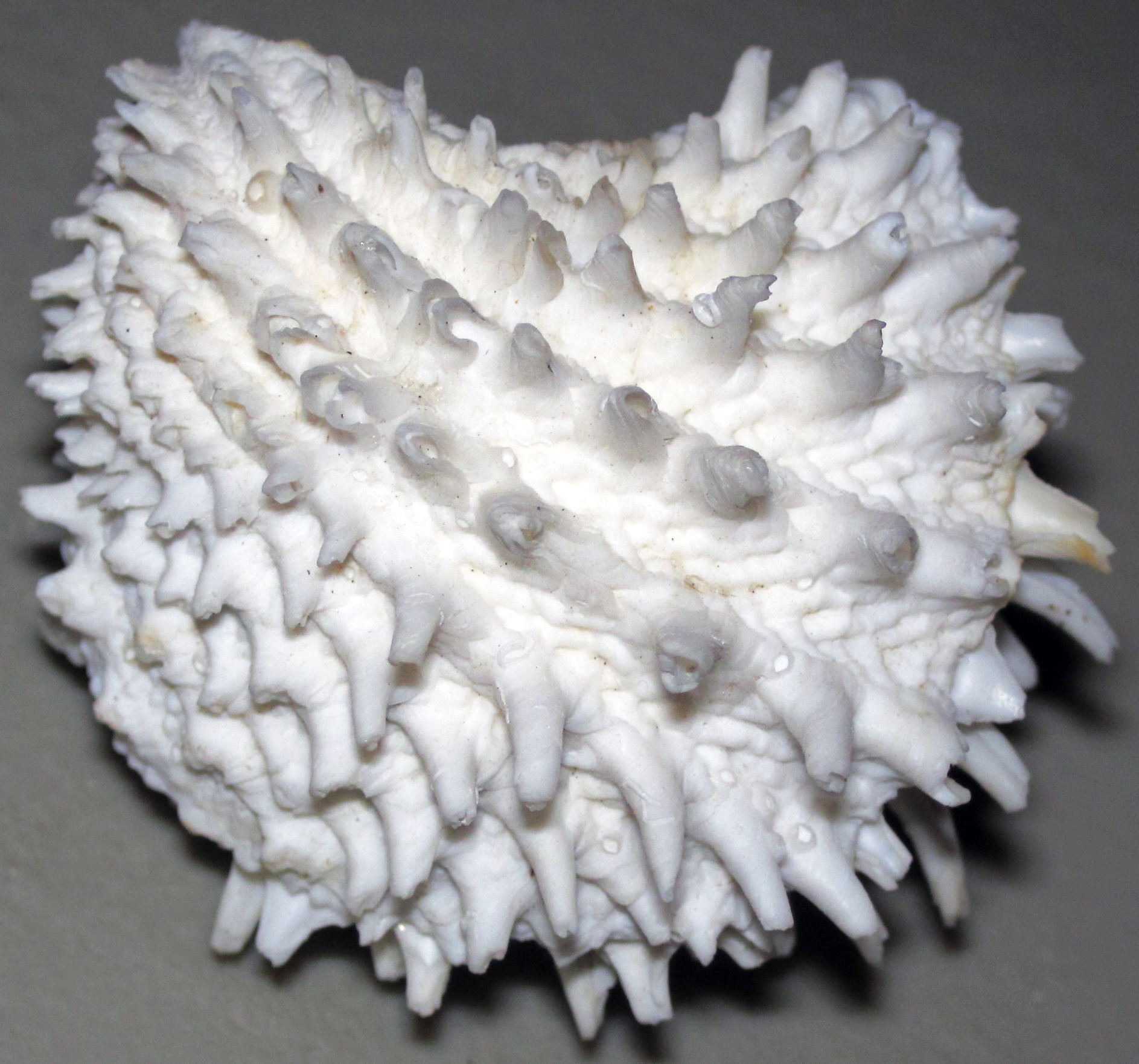

Scientific classification
- Kingdom: Animalia
- Phylum: Mollusca
- Class: Bivalvia
- Order: Venerida
- Superfamily: Chamoidea
- Family: Chamidae
- Genus: Arcinella
- Species: A. cornuta

Binomial name
- Arcinella cornuta Conrad, 1866

= Arcinella cornuta =

Species of bivalve

Arcinella cornuta, or the Florida spiny jewelbox clam or Florida spiny jewel box, is a marine species of bivalve mollusc in the family Chamidae. It can be found along the coast of North Carolina to Florida, Gulf of Mexico, Caribbean Central America, and Venezuela.

== Description ==
Right valve of a specimen from the Pliocene of Florida

The shell of A. cornuta is quadrangular to obliquely trigonal. It attaches itself to surfaces during its early growth stage, after that it is free-living. The shell features seven to nine radial rows of pleated radial ribs covered by large spines with coarse pitting between ribs. The exterior is a creamy white color with the interior being white with flushed pink and/or yellow coloration. The typical habitat is that of coral reefs.

Juvenile

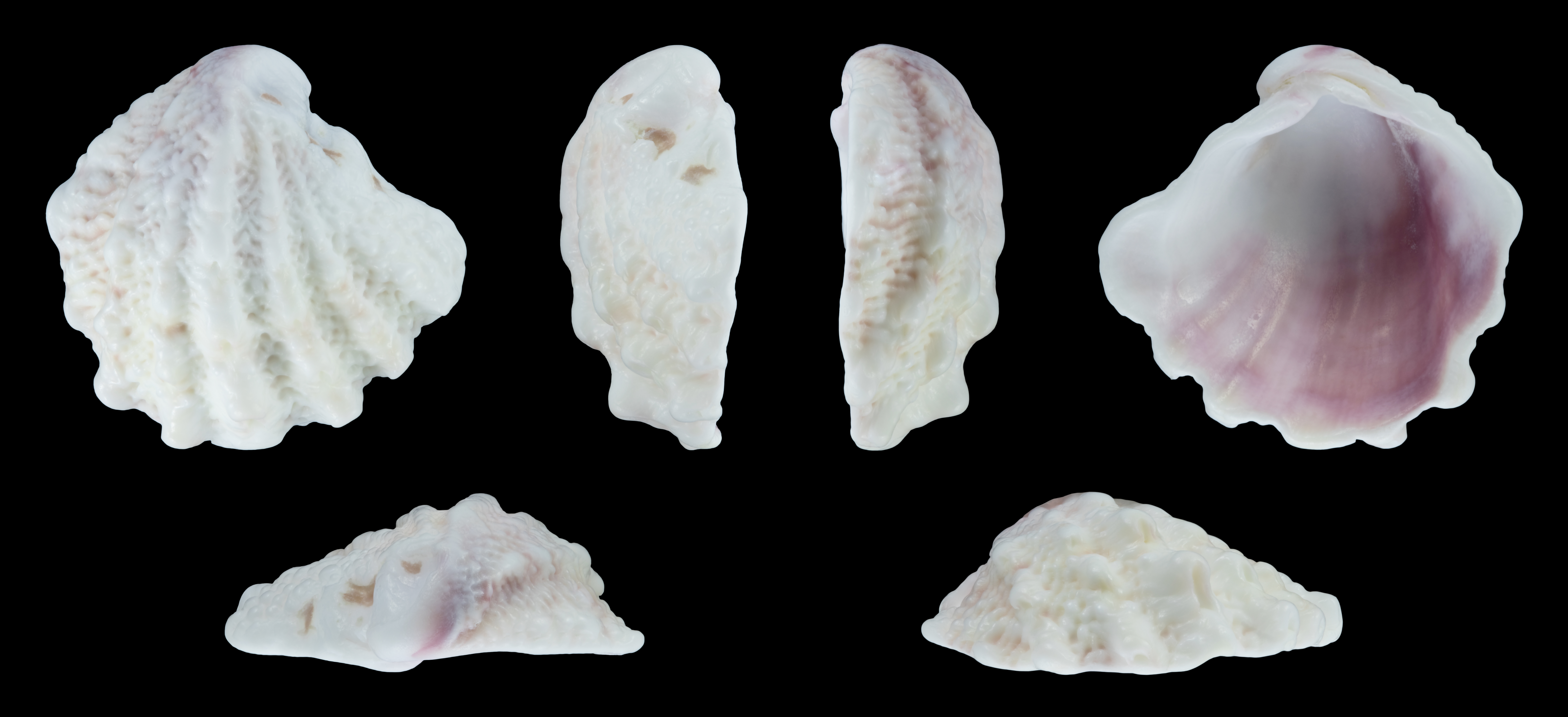
Right valve

Left valve
