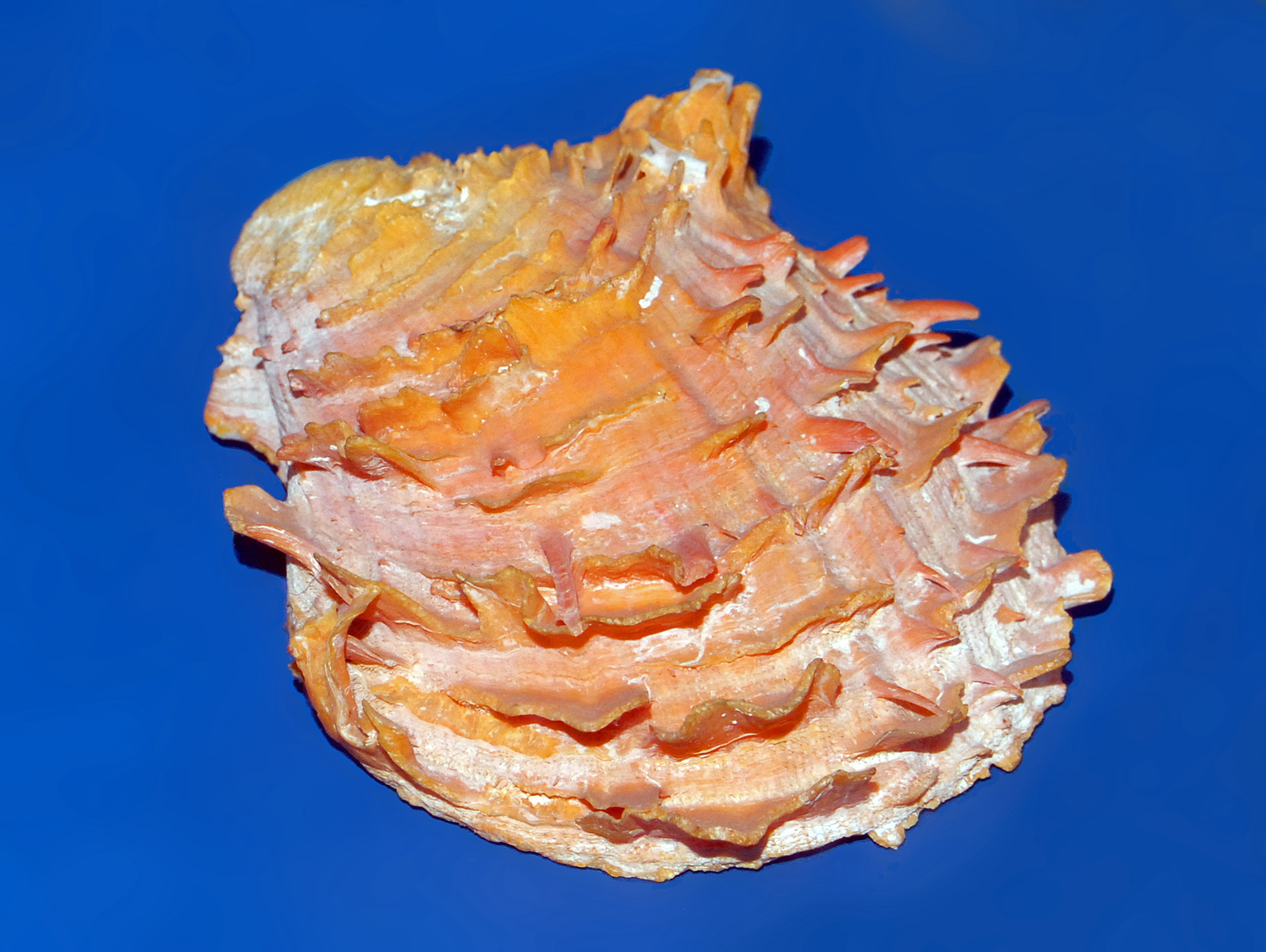
- Shell of Chama lazarus from Philippines at the Museo Civico di Storia Naturale di Milano

Scientific classification
- Kingdom: Animalia
- Phylum: Mollusca
- Class: Bivalvia
- Order: Venerida
- Family: Chamidae
- Genus: Chama; Linnaeus, 1758

Type species
- Chama lazarus Linnaeus, 1758

Species
- See text

Synonyms
- Chama (Chama) Linnaeus, 1758; Lacinea G. B. Sowerby II, 1842; Maceris Modeer, 1793; Macerophylla Meuschen, 1787 ·; Psilopoderma Poli, 1795; Psilopus Poli, 1795

= Chama (bivalve) =

Chama Temporal range: Cretaceous – Present

Genus of bivalves

Chama is a genus of cemented saltwater clams, marine bivalve molluscs in the family Chamidae, the jewel boxes.

== Species ==
Illustration of various species of Chama, 1783

Extant species within this genus include:

- Chama ambigua Lischke, 1870
- Chama anhduongae Thach, 2023
- Chama arcana F. R. Bernard, 1987
- Chama asperella Lamarck, 1819
- Chama brassica Reeve, 1847
- Chama buddiana C.B. Adams, 1852
- Chama cerinorhodon Hamada & Matsukuma, 2005
- Chama cerion Matsukuma, Paulay & Hamada, 2003
- Chama circinata di Monterosato, 1878
- Chama congregata Conrad, 1833
- Chama coralloides Reeve, 1846
- Chama crenulata Lamarck, 1819
- Chama croceata Lamarck, 1819
- Chama dunkeri Lischke, 1870
- Chama echinata Broderip, 1835
- Chama florida Lamarck, 1819
- Chama frondosa Broderip, 1835
- Chama gryphoides Linnaeus, 1758
- Chama hicksi Valentich-Scott & Coan, 2010
- Chama isaacooki Healy, Lamprell & Stanisic, 1993
- Chama lazarus Linnaeus, 1758
- Chama limbula Lamarck, 1819
- Chama linguafelis Reeve, 1847
- Chama lobata Broderip, 1835
- Chama macerophylla Gmelin, 1791
- Chama oomedusae Matsukuma, 1996
- Chama pacifica Broderip, 1835
- Chama pellucida Broderip, 1835
- Chama producta Broderip, 1835
- Chama pulchella Reeve, 1846
- Chama rubropicta Bartsch & Rehder, 1939
- Chama ruderalis Lamarck, 1819
- Chama sarda Reeve, 1847
- Chama sinuosa Broderip, 1835
- Chama sordida Broderip, 1835
- Chama tinctoria F. R. Bernard, 1976
- Chama venosa Reeve, 1847
- Chama yaroni Delsaerdt, 1986

== Extinct species ==
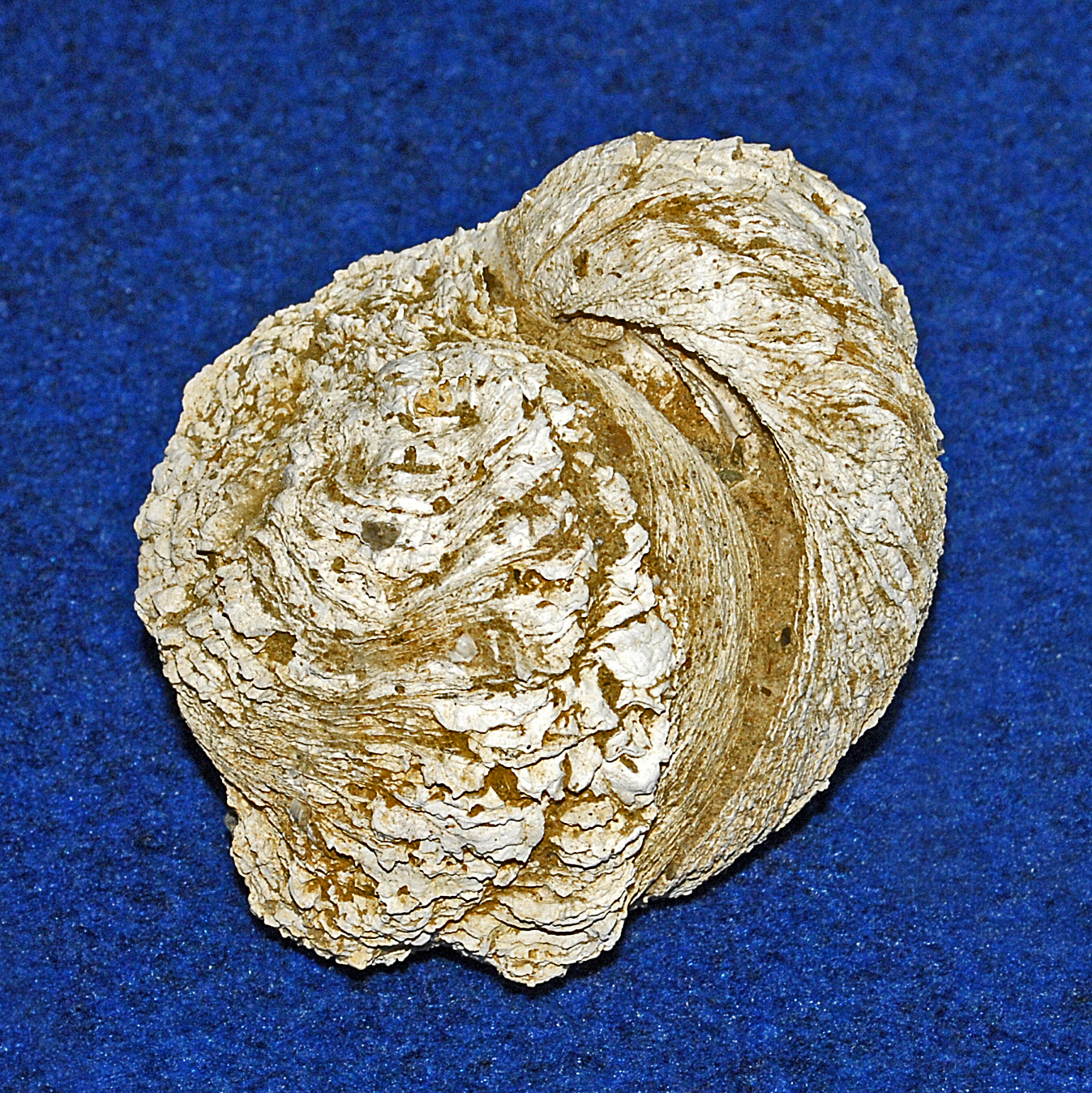
Fossil shell of Chama gryphoides

Extinct species within this genus include:

- Chama asperella† Lamarck, 1819
- Chama aspersa† Reeve, 1846
- Chama berjadinensis† Hodson, 1927
- Chama bezanconi † Cossmann, 1887
- Chama brassica† Reeve, 1847
- Chama calcarata† Lamarck, 1806
- Chama callipona† Maury, 1924
- Chama chipolana† Dall, 1903
- Chama corticosaformis† Weisbord, 1929
- Chama eudeila† Maury, 1924
- Chama fimbriata† Defrance, 1817
- Chama fragum† Reeve, 1847
- Chama huttoni† Hector, 1886
- Chama involuta† Guppy, 1873
- Chama lamellifera† Tenison Woods, 1877
- Chama monroensis† Aldrich, 1903
- Chama nejdensis† Abbass, 1972
- Chama pacifica† Broderip, 1834
- Chama pittensis† Marwick, 1928
- Chama radiata† Dockery, 1977
- Chama reflexa† Reeve, 1846
- Chama ruderalis† Lamarck, 1819
- Chama scheibei† Anderson, 1929
- Chama strepta† Woodring, 1982
- † Chama attenuata K. Martin, 1885
- † Chama bezanconi Cossmann, 1887
- † Chama cosulcata Pezant, 1911
- † Chama dahanaensis Icke & K. Martin, 1907
- † Chama depauperata Deshayes, 1858
- † Chama distans Deshayes, 1858
- † Chama ferrata Berezovsky, 2021
- † Chama fragilis K. Martin, 1879
- † Chama hunua Eagle, 2000
- † Chama inornata Deshayes, 1858
- † Chama intricata Deshayes, 1858
- † Chama lactuca Dall, 1886
- † Chama lamellifera Tenison Woods, 1877
- † Chama lamellosa Lamarck, 1806
- † Chama niasensis Icke & K. Martin, 1907
- † Chama ovalis K. Martin, 1879
- † Chama papyracea Deshayes, 1830
- † Chama plicatella Melleville, 1843
- † Chama punctata Bruguière, 1792
- † Chama punctulata Deshayes, 1858
- † Chama sedanensis Haanstra & Spiker, 1932
- † Chama simplex K. Martin, 1883
- † Chama squamosa Solander, 1766
- † Chama subcalcarata Berezovsky, 2021
- † Chama subgigas d'Orbigny, 1850
- † Chama umbgrovei K. Martin, 1931

This genus is known in the fossil record from the Cretaceous period to the Quaternary period (age range 130.0 to 0.0 million years ago.). Fossil shells within this genus have been found all over the world.
