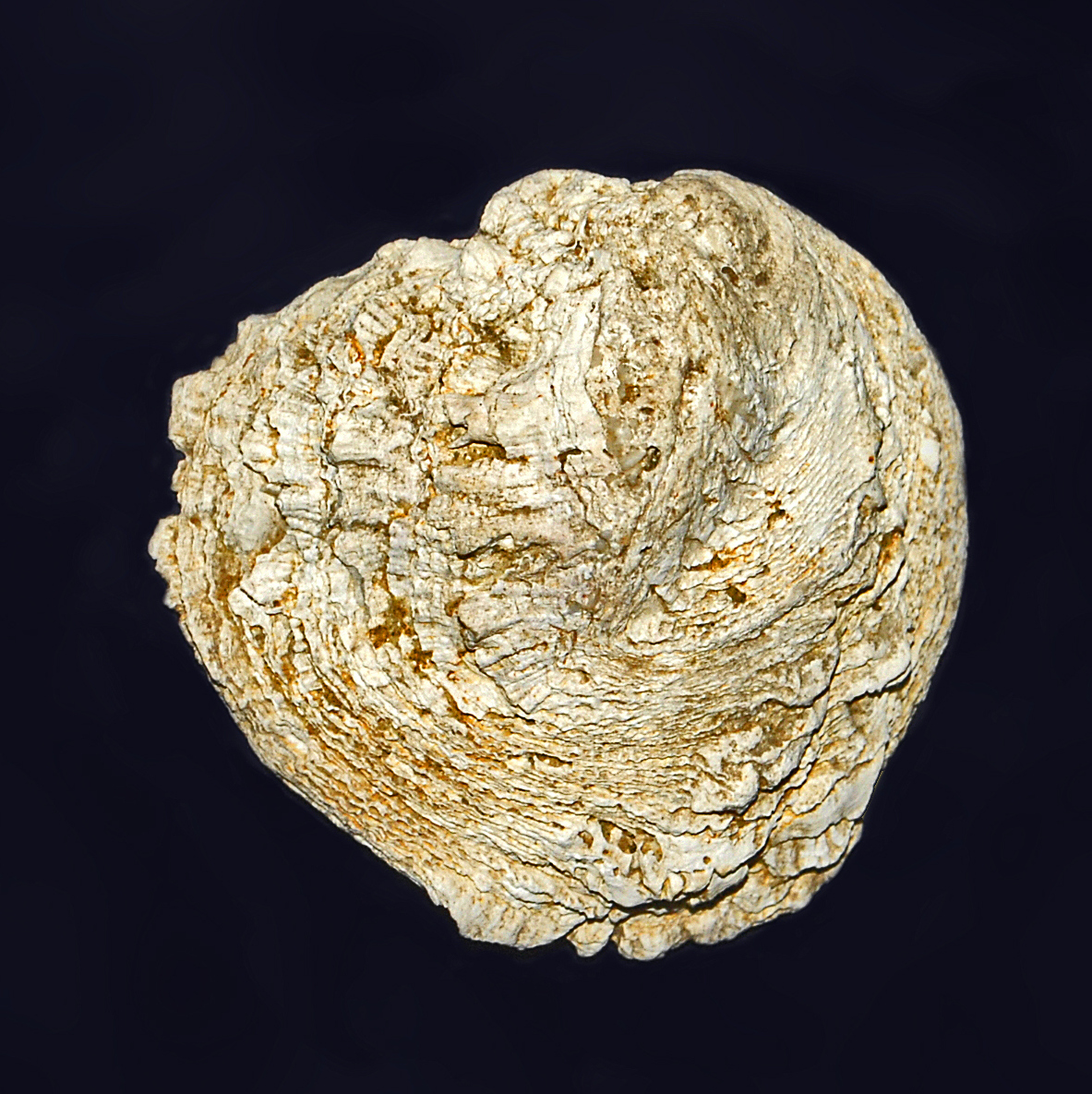
- Fossil valve of Pseudochama gryphina from Pliocene of Italy

Scientific classification
- Kingdom: Animalia
- Phylum: Mollusca
- Class: Bivalvia
- Order: Venerida
- Superfamily: Chamoidea
- Family: Chamidae
- Genus: Pseudochama; Odhner, 1917

Species
- See text.

= Pseudochama =

Pseudochama Temporal range: Eocene – Present

Genus of bivalves

Pseudochama is a species of bivalve mollusc in the family Chamidae.

== Fossil records ==
The genus is known from the Eocene to the Recent periods (age range: from 40.4 to 0.0 million years ago). Fossils shells have been found all over the world.

== Species ==
Species within this genus include:

- Pseudochama cristella (Lamarck, 1819)
- Pseudochama exogyra (Conrad, 1837) – Pacific jewelbox
- Pseudochama granti Strong, 1934 – deep jewelbox
- Pseudochama gryphina (Lamarck, 1819)
- Pseudochama inezae Bayer, 1943 – alabaster jewelbox
- Pseudochama radians (Lamarck, 1819) – Atlantic jewelbox (accepted as Pseudochama cristella Lamarck, 1819)

Synonyms:

- Chama cornuta Dillwyn, 1817 and Chama gryphina Lamarck, 1819 have been accepted as Pseudochama gryphina.
