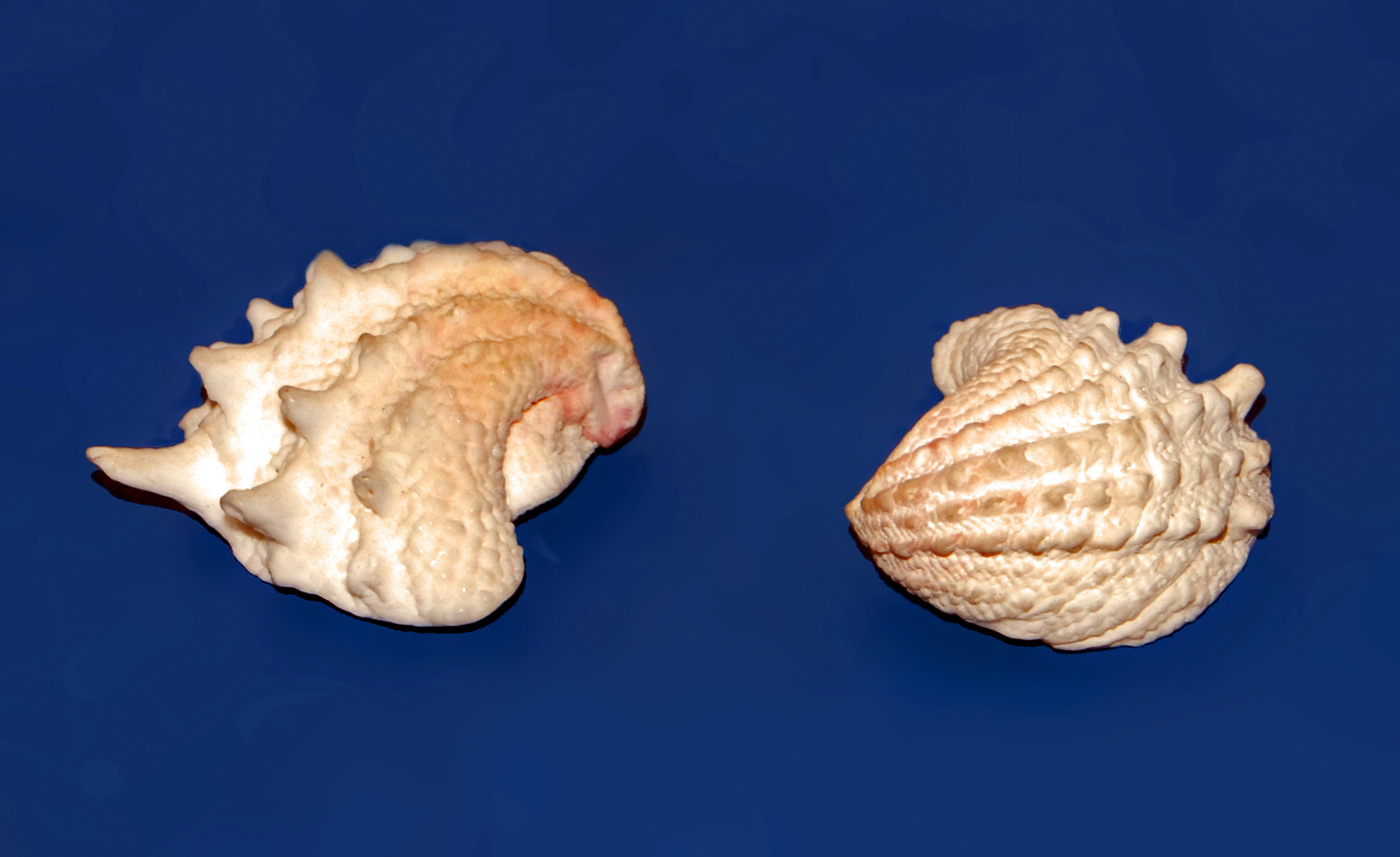
- Shell of Arcinella arcinella from Florida at the Museo Civico di Storia Naturale di Milano

Scientific classification
- Kingdom: Animalia
- Phylum: Mollusca
- Class: Bivalvia
- Order: Venerida
- Family: Chamidae
- Genus: Arcinella
- Species: A. arcinella

Binomial name
- Arcinella arcinella (Linnaeus, 1767)

Synonyms
- Arcinella spinosa Schumacher, 1817; Chama arcinella Linnaeus, 1767; Chama bonanni Hanley, 1885; Echinochama arcinella (Linnaeus, 1767)

= Arcinella arcinella =

Species of bivalve

Arcinella arcinella, or the Caribbean spiny jewel box clam, spiny jewel box clam, or spiny jewel box, is a species of bivalve mollusc in the family Chamidae.

== Description ==
Arcinella arcinella has a shell reaching a size of about 55 mm. The shells of this common Caribbean species are pale brown to yellowish white in color with about 20 rows of spines. The interior is white. These molluscs are suspension filter feeders.

Right and left valve of the same specimen:

Right valve

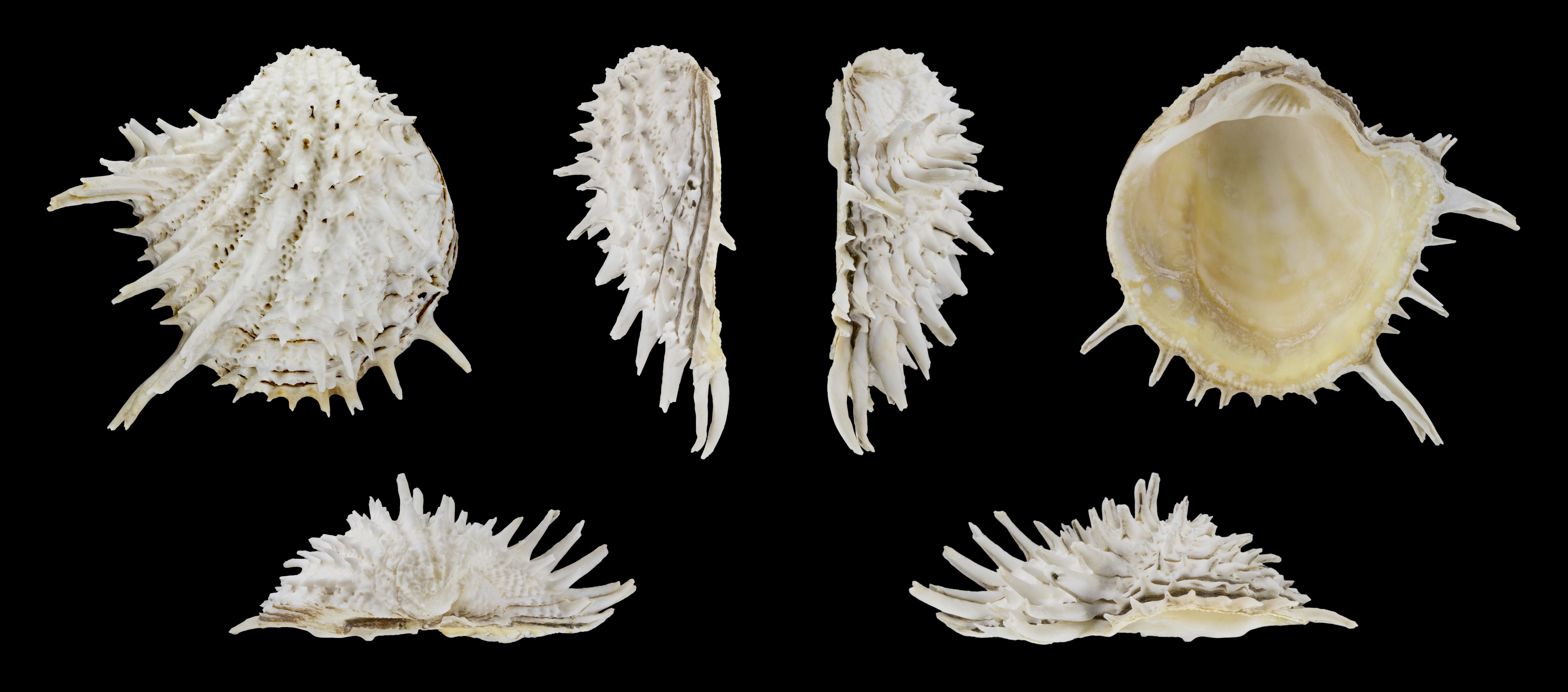
Left valve

== Distribution ==
This species can be found in Caribbean waters, ranging from the West Indies to South America. It is present at a depth from 2 to 73 m.
