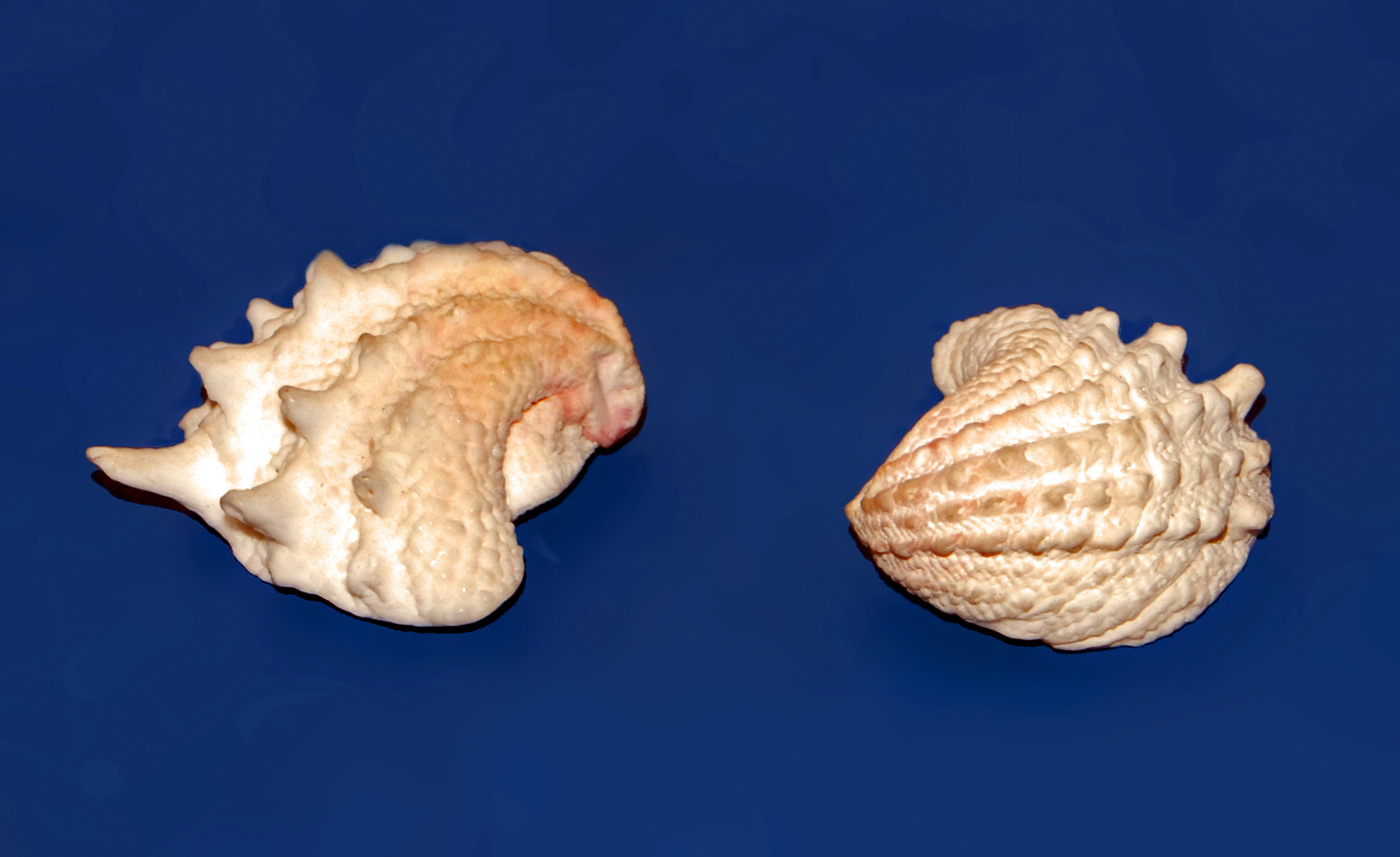
- Shell of Arcinella arcinella from Florida at the Museo Civico di Storia Naturale di Milano

Scientific classification
- Kingdom: Animalia
- Phylum: Mollusca
- Class: Bivalvia
- Order: Venerida
- Superfamily: Chamoidea
- Family: Chamidae
- Genus: Arcinella; Schumacher, 1817

Type species
- Arcinella spinosa Schumacher, 1817

Species
- See text

Synonyms
- Echinochama P. Fischer, 1887 (unnecessary replacement name for Arcinella Schumacher, 1817)

= Arcinella =

Genus of bivalves

Arcinella is a genus of bivalve mollusc in the family Chamidae.

== Species ==
- Arcinella arcinella (Linnaeus, 1767)
- Arcinella brasiliana (Nicol, 1953)
- Arcinella californica (Dall, 1903)
- Arcinella cornuta Conrad, 1866

Synonyms

- Arcinella carinata Philippi, 1844: synonym of Basterotina angulata (S. V. Wood, 1857)
- Arcinella cruda Dall, Bartsch & Rehder, 1938: synonym of Cardita hawaiensis (Dall, Bartsch & Rehder, 1938)
- Arcinella hawaiensis Dall, Bartsch & Rehder, 1938: synonym of Cardita hawaiensis (Dall, Bartsch & Rehder, 1938)
- Arcinella laevis Philippi, 1844: synonym of Kurtiella bidentata (Montagu, 1803)
- Arcinella laysana Dall, Bartsch & Rehder, 1938: synonym of Cardita hawaiensis (Dall, Bartsch & Rehder, 1938)
- Arcinella sandalina Monterosato, 1872: synonym of Gregariella semigranata (Reeve, 1858)
- Arcinella spinosa Schumacher, 1817: synonym of Arcinella arcinella (Linnaeus, 1767)
- Arcinella thaanumi Dall, Bartsch & Rehder, 1938: synonym of Cardita excisa Philippi, 1847
