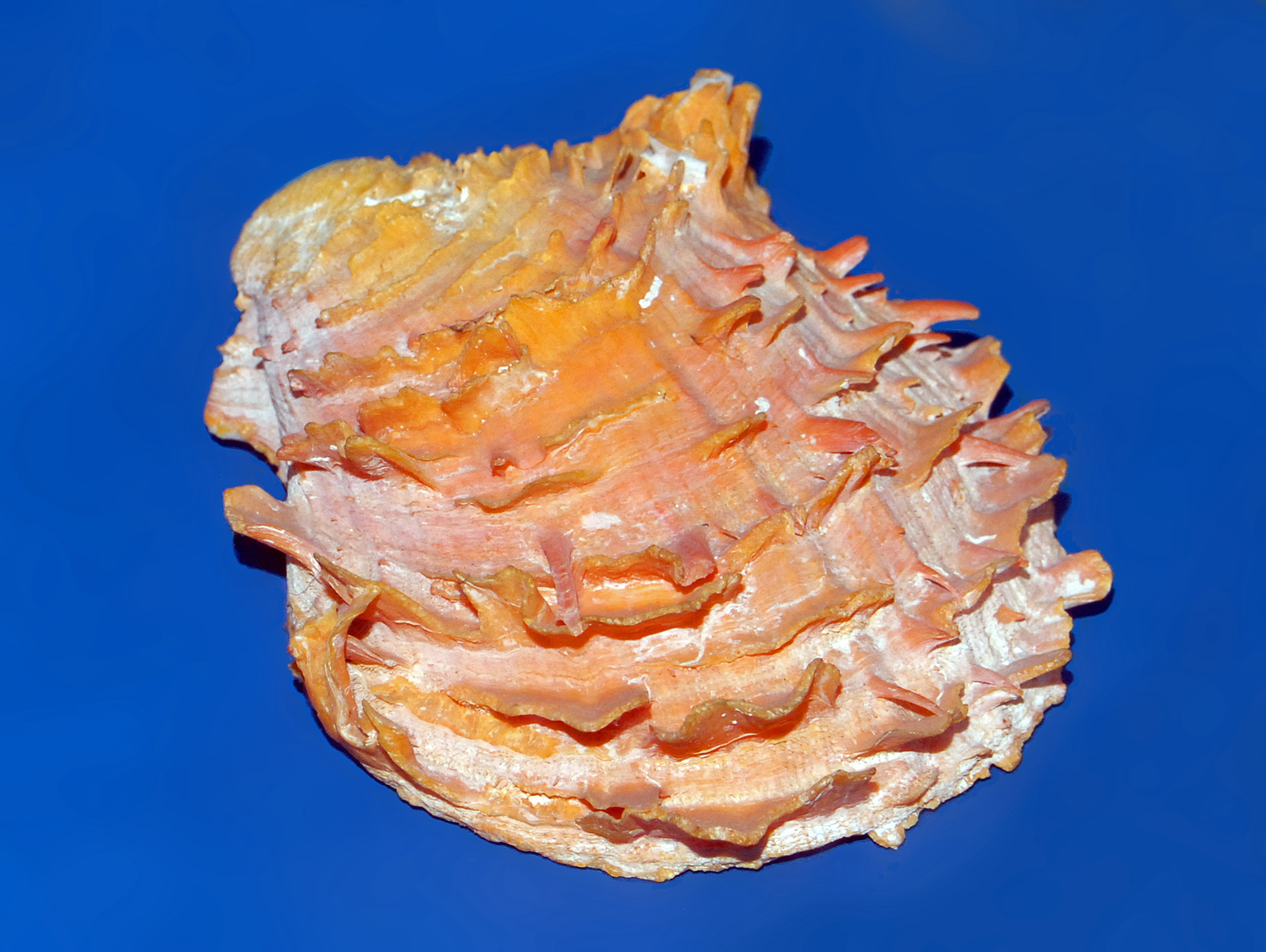
- Chama lazarus

Scientific classification
- Kingdom: Animalia
- Phylum: Mollusca
- Class: Bivalvia
- Order: Venerida
- Superfamily: Chamoidea; Lamarck, 1809
- Family: Chamidae; Lamarck, 1809

Genera
- See text

= Chamidae =

Chamidae Temporal range: Early Cretaceous–recent, 130–0 Ma

Family of molluscs

Chamidae, common name the jewel box clams or jewel boxes, is a family of marine bivalve mollusks in the order Venerida.

== Genera and species ==
There are six genera the family Chamidae:

- Amphichama Kuroda & Habe, 1961
- Arcinella Schumacher, 1817
- Carditochama Matsukuma, 1996
- Chama Linnaeus, 1758
- Eopseuma Odhner, 1919
- Pseudochama Odhner, 1917
