= Globivenus rugatina =

Scientific classification
- Kingdom: Animalia
- Phylum: Mollusca
- Class: Bivalvia
- Order: Venerida
- Family: Veneridae
- Genus: Globivenus
- Species: G. rugatina

Binomial name
- Globivenus rugatina (Heilprin, 1886)

Synonyms
- Antigona rugatina (Heilprin, 1886); Ventricolaria rugatina (Heilprin, 1886); Venus rugatina Heilprin, 1886

Species of bivalve

Globivenus rugatina, or the queen Venus clam, is a species of bivalve mollusc in the family Veneridae. It can be found along the Atlantic coast of North America, ranging from North Carolina to the West Indies.
