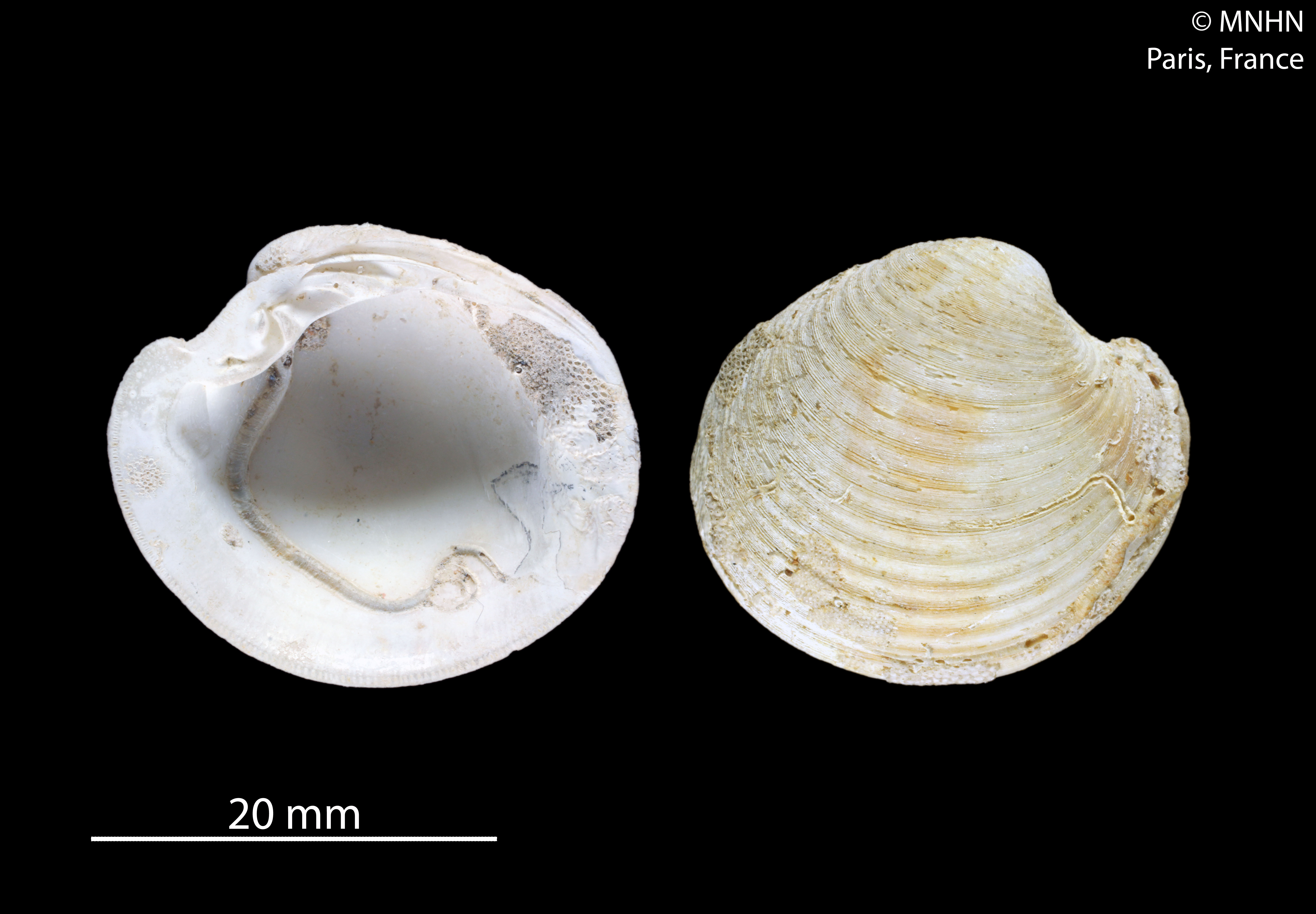
- Globivenus kempfi

Scientific classification
- Domain: Eukaryota
- Kingdom: Animalia
- Phylum: Mollusca
- Class: Bivalvia
- Order: Venerida
- Family: Veneridae
- Genus: Globivenus; Coen, 1934

Synonyms
- Ventricolaria Keen, 1954; Ventricula Martens, 1880

= Globivenus =

Genus of bivalves

Globivenus is a genus of bivalves in the family Veneridae. It has a nearly cosmopolitan distribution, except for subarctic regions.

== Species ==
The following species are recognised in the genus Globivenus:

- Globivenus banaconensis Poppe, Tagaro & Goto, 2018
- Globivenus callimorpha (Dall, 1902)
- Globivenus capricornea (Hedley, 1908)
- Globivenus effossa (Philippi, 1836)
- Globivenus embrithes (Melvill & Standen, 1899)
- Globivenus fordii (Yates, 1890)
- Globivenus foresti (Fischer-Piette & Testud, 1967)
- Globivenus helenae (Fischer-Piette, 1975)
- Globivenus isocardia (Verrill, 1870)
- Globivenus kempfi (Fischer-Piette & Testud, 1970)
- Globivenus lepidoglypta (Dall, 1902)
- Globivenus libellus (de Rayneval, Van den Hecke & Ponzi, 1854)
- Globivenus listeroides (Fischer-Piette & Testud, 1967)
- Globivenus magdalenae (Dall, 1902)
- Globivenus mindoroensis (E. A. Smith, 1916)
- Globivenus neozelanica Marwick, 1965
- Globivenus orientalis (Cox, 1930)
- Globivenus pereffossa (Dautzenberg & H. Fischer, 1906)
- Globivenus rigida (Dillwyn, 1817)
- Globivenus rugatina (Heilprin, 1887)
- Globivenus snellii (Fischer-Piette, 1975)
- Globivenus strigillina (Dall, 1902)
- Globivenus toreuma (Gould, 1850)
