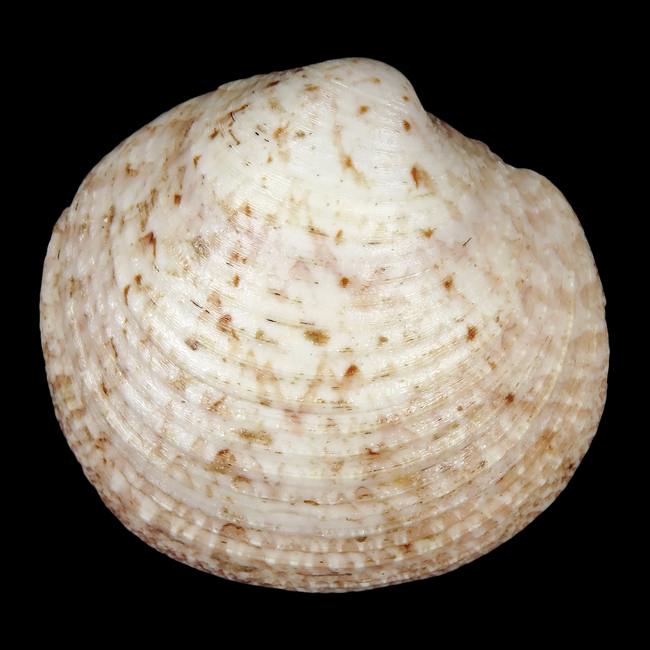

Scientific classification
- Kingdom: Animalia
- Phylum: Mollusca
- Class: Bivalvia
- Order: Venerida
- Family: Veneridae
- Genus: Globivenus
- Species: G. banaconensis

Binomial name
- Globivenus banaconensis Poppe, Tagaro & Goto, 2018

= Globivenus banaconensis =

Species of bivalve

Globivenus banaconensis is a species of marine bivalve mollusc in the family Veneridae.

== Original description ==
- Poppe G.T., Tagaro S.P. & Goto Y. (2018). New marine species from the Central Philippines. Visaya. 5(1): 91-135. page(s): 116, pl. 16 figs 1-2.
