= Globivenus rigida =

Scientific classification
- Kingdom: Animalia
- Phylum: Mollusca
- Class: Bivalvia
- Order: Venerida
- Family: Veneridae
- Genus: Globivenus
- Species: G. rigida

Binomial name
- Globivenus rigida (Dillwyn, 1817)

Synonyms
- Antigona rugosa (Gmelin, 1792); Cytherea rigida (Dillwyn, 1817); Ventricolaria rigida (Dillwyn, 1817); Ventricolaria rigida subsp. rigida; Venus pilula Reeve, 1863; Venus rigida Dillwyn, 1817; Venus rugosa Gmelin, 1791

Species of bivalve

Globivenus rigida, or the rigid Venus clam, is a species of bivalve mollusc in the family Veneridae. It can be found along the Atlantic coast of North America, ranging from southern Florida to the West Indies and Brazil.
