= Cranopsis (gastropod) =

- Cranopsis pelex 001

Scientific classification
- Kingdom: Animalia
- Phylum: Mollusca
- Class: Gastropoda
- Subclass: Vetigastropoda
- Order: Lepetellida
- Superfamily: Fissurelloidea
- Family: Fissurellidae
- Subfamily: Zeidorinae
- Genus: Cranopsis; Adams, 1860

Type species
- Cranopsis pelex Adams, 1860

Synonyms
- Puncturella (Cranopsis) , 1860

Genus of gastropods

Cranopsis was previously a genus of sea snails, marine gastropod mollusks in the family Fissurellidae, the keyhole limpets.

Cranopsis is since 2019 considered a synonym of Puncturella.

The placement of this genus is uncertain. Its validity is being debated.

== Description ==
The fissure lies about the middle of the anterior side. An internal vaulted chamber is found over the foramen, resembling that of Puncturella

== Species brought into synonymy ==
- Cranopsis aethiopica (Martens, 1902): synonym of Rimulanax aethiopica (Martens, 1902)
- Cranopsis agger (Watson, 1883) : synonym of Puncturella agger R. B. Watson, 1883
- Cranopsis alaris Simone & Cunha, 2014: synonym of Puncturella alaris (Simone & C. Cunha, 2014) (original combination)
- Cranopsis antillana (Pérez Farfante, 1947): synonym of Puncturella antillana Pérez Farfante, 1947
- Cranopsis apostrema Simone & Cunha, 2014: synonym of Puncturella apostrema (Simone & C. Cunha, 2014) (original combination)
- Cranopsis asturiana (P. Fischer, 1882): synonym of Puncturella asturiana (P. Fischer, 1882)
- Cranopsis billsae (Pérez Farfante, 1947): synonym of Puncturella billsae Pérez Farfante, 1947
- Cranopsis canopa Simone & Cunha, 2014: synonym of Puncturella canopa (Simone & C. Cunha, 2014) (original combination)
- Cranopsis carinifera (Schepman, 1908): synonym of Puncturella carinifera (Schepman, 1908)
- Cranopsis cearensis Simone & Cunha, 2014: synonym of Puncturella cearensis (Simone & C. Cunha, 2014) (original combination)
- Cranopsis columbaris Simone & Cunha, 2014: synonym of Puncturella columbaris (Simone & C. Cunha, 2014) (original combination)
- Cranopsis cucullata (Gould, 1846): synonym of Puncturella cucullata (Gould, 1846)
- Cranopsis cumingii (Adams, 1853): synonym of Puncturella cumingii (A. Adams, 1853)
- Cranopsis decorata Cowan & McLean, 1968: synonym of Puncturella decorata Cowan & McLean, 1968
- Cranopsis enigmatica Simone & Cunha, 2014: synonym of Puncturella enigmatica (Simone & C. Cunha, 2014) (original combination)
- Cranopsis erecta (Dall, 1889): synonym of Puncturella erecta Dall, 1889
- Cranopsis expansa (Dall, 1896): synonym of Puncturella expansa (Dall, 1896)
- Cranopsis exquisita (Adams, 1853): synonym of Puncturella exquisita (A. Adams, 1853)
- Cranopsis floris Poppe, Tagaro & Stahlschmidt, 2015: synonym of Puncturella floris (Poppe, Tagaro & Stahlschmidt, 2015) (original combination)
- Cranopsis granulata (Seguenza, 1862): synonym of Puncturella granulata (Seguenza, 1863)
- Cranopsis hycavis Simone & Cunha, 2014: synonym of Puncturella hycavis (Simone & C. Cunha, 2014) (original combination)
- Cranopsis larva (Dall, 1927): synonym of Puncturella larva (Dall, 1927)
- Cranopsis major (Dall, 1891): synonym of Puncturella major Dall, 1891
- Cranopsis multistriata (Dall, 1914): synonym of Puncturella multistriata Dall, 1914
- Cranopsis nymphalis Simone & Cunha, 2014: synonym of Puncturella nymphalis (Simone & C. Cunha, 2014) (original combination)
- Cranopsis pelex Adams, 1860: synonym of Puncturella pelex (A. Adams, 1860) (original combination)
- Cranopsis pileolus Adams, 1860: synonym of Puncturella pileolus (A. Adams, 1860) (original combination)
- Cranopsis serraticostata (Herbert & Kilburn, 1986): synonym of Puncturella serraticosta Herbert & Kilburn, 1986
- Cranopsis tosaensis (Habe, 1951): synonym of Puncturella tosaensis Habe, 1951
- Cranopsis verrieri (Crosse, 1871): synonym of Puncturella verrieri (Crosse, 1871)
