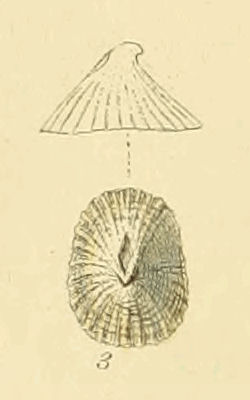
- Puncturella noachina shell

Scientific classification
- Kingdom: Animalia
- Phylum: Mollusca
- Class: Gastropoda
- Subclass: Vetigastropoda
- Order: Lepetellida
- Superfamily: Fissurelloidea
- Family: Fissurellidae
- Subfamily: Zeidorinae
- Genus: Puncturella; R. T. Lowe, 1827

Type species
- Patella noachina Linnaeus, 1771

Synonyms
- Cemoria Risso, 1826 [ex Leach MS]; Cranopsis A. Adams, 1860; Cremoria Gray, 1842 (incorrect subsequent spelling of Cemoria); Puncturella (Cranopsis) Adams, 1860; Puncturella (Puncturella); Puncturella (Rimulanax) Iredale, 1924 (taxon inquirendum); Sipho T. Brown, 1827

= Puncturella =

Genus of gastropods

Puncturella is a genus of minute deepwater keyhole limpets, marine gastropod mollusks or micromollusks in the family Fissurellidae, the keyhole limpets and slit limpets.

== Species ==
Species in this genus include:

- Puncturella abyssicola Verrill, 1885
- Puncturella agger R. B. Watson, 1883
- Puncturella alaris (Simone & C. Cunha, 2014)
- Puncturella altaparva Poppe & Tagaro, 2020
- Puncturella analoga E. von Martens, 1902
- Puncturella antillana Pérez Farfante, 1947
- Puncturella apostrema (Simone & C. Cunha, 2014)
- Puncturella asturiana (P. Fischer, 1882)
- Puncturella billsae Pérez Farfante, 1947
- Puncturella brychia Watson, 1883
- Puncturella canopa (Simone & C. Cunha, 2014)
- Puncturella capensis Thiele, 1919
- † Puncturella capuliformis (Pecchioli, 1864)
- Puncturella carinifera (Schepman, 1908)
- Puncturella caryophylla Dall, 1914
- Puncturella cearensis (Simone & C. Cunha, 2014)
- Puncturella columbaris (Simone & C. Cunha, 2014)
- Puncturella conica (d'Orbigny, 1841)
- Puncturella cooperi Carpenter, 1864
- Puncturella cucullata (Gould, 1846)
- Puncturella cumingii (A. Adams, 1853)
- Puncturella curva Golikov & Gulbin, 1978
- Puncturella decorata Cowan & McLean, 1968
- Puncturella dorcas Kira & Habe, 1951
- Puncturella enigmatica (Simone & C. Cunha, 2014)
- Puncturella erecta Dall, 1889
- Puncturella expansa (Dall, 1896)
- Puncturella exquisita (A. Adams, 1853)
- Puncturella falklandica (A. Adams, 1863)
- Puncturella fastigiata Adams, 1853
- Puncturella floris (Poppe, Tagaro & Stahlschmidt, 2015)
- Puncturella galeata (Gould, 1846)
- Puncturella galerita Hedley, 1902
- Puncturella gigantea Schepman, 1908
- Puncturella granitesta (Okutani, 1968)
- Puncturella granulata (Seguenza, 1863)
- Puncturella harrisoni Beddome, 1883
- Puncturella hirasei Otuka, 1935
- Puncturella hycavis (Simone & C. Cunha, 2014)
- Puncturella indica E. A. Smith, 1899
- Puncturella kawamurai Habe, 1961
- Puncturella larva (Dall, 1927)
- Puncturella longifissa Dall, 1914
- Puncturella major Dall, 1891
- Puncturella multistriata Dall, 1914
- Puncturella noachina (Linnaeus, 1771) - type species
- Puncturella nobilis (A. Adams, 1860)
- Puncturella nymphalis (Simone & C. Cunha, 2014)
- Puncturella parvinobilis Okutani, Fujikura & Sasaki, 1993
- Puncturella pauper Dall, 1927
- Puncturella pelex (A. Adams, 1860)
- Puncturella piccirida Palazzi & Villari, 2001
- Puncturella pileolus (A. Adams, 1860)
- Puncturella plecta Watson, 1883
- Puncturella pseudanaloga Powell, 1957
- Puncturella punctocostata Berry, 1947
- Puncturella raricostata Golikov & Sirenko, 1980
- Puncturella regia (Shikama & Habe, 1961)
- Puncturella rimaizenaensis Okutani, Fujikura & Sasaki, 1993
- Puncturella rothi McLean, 1984
- Puncturella serraticosta Herbert & Kilburn, 1986
- Puncturella similis Warén & Bouchet, 2009
- Puncturella sinensis Sowerby III, 1894
- Puncturella solis Beck, 1996
- Puncturella spirigera Thiele, 1912
- Puncturella stellasplendida Poppe & Tagaro, 2020
- Puncturella teramachii Kira & Habe, 1949
- Puncturella tosaensis Habe, 1951
- Puncturella verrieri (Crosse, 1871)
- Puncturella volcano Simone & Cunha, 2014

Species brought into synonymy

- Puncturella aethiopica Martens, 1902: synonym of Rimulanax aethiopica (E. von Martens, 1902) (original combination)
- Puncturella alicei (Dautzenberg & Fischer H., 1897): synonym of Profundisepta alicei (Dautzenberg & Fischer, 1897)
- Puncturella analoga Martens, 1903: synonym of Puncturella conica (d'Orbigny, 1841)
- Puncturella asturiana (Fischer, 1882): synonym of Cranopsis asturiana (Fischer, 1882)
- Puncturella asturiana var. alta Locard, 1898: synonym of Cranopsis asturiana (Fischer 1882)
- Puncturella christiaensi Kilburn, 1978: synonym of Puncturella nana (Adams, 1872)
- Puncturella corolla Verco, 1908: synonym of Rimulanax corolla (Verco, 1908) (original combination)
- Puncturella craticia Watson, 1883: synonym of Cranopsis asturiana (Fischer, 1882)
- Puncturella decorata Cowan & McLean, 1968: synonym of Cranopsis decorata (Cowan & McLean, 1968)
- Puncturella demissa Hedley, 1904: synonym of Puncturella kesteveni Hedley, 1900
- Puncturella enderbyensis Powell, 1958: synonym of Fissurisepta enderbyensis (Powell, 1958)
- Puncturella expansa (Dall, 1896): synonym of Cranopsis expansa (Dall, 1896)
- Puncturella fumarium Hedley, 1911: synonym of Fissurisepta fumarium (Hedley, 1911)
- Puncturella granulata Seguenza, 1862: synonym of Rimula granulata Seguenza, 1862
- Puncturella henniana Brazier, 1894: synonym of Puncturella harrisoni Beddome, 1883
- Puncturella kesteveni Hedley, 1900: synonym of Vacerrena kesteveni (Hedley, 1900) (original combination)
- Puncturella microphyma Dautzenberg & Fischer, 1896: synonym of Cornisepta microphyma (Dautzenberg & Fischer, 1896)
- Puncturella nana (Adams, 1872): synonym of Vacerrena nana (H. Adams, 1872)
- Puncturella pacifica Cowan, 1969: synonym of Fissurisepta pacifica (Cowan, 1969)
- Puncturella profundi (Jeffreys, 1877): synonym of Profundisepta profundi (Jeffreys, 1877)
- Puncturella sportella Watson, 1883 : synonym of Profundisepta sportella (Watson, 1883)
- Puncturella tuberculata Watson, 1883: synonym of Cranopsis granulata (Seguenza, 1863)
- Puncturella voraginosa Herbert & Kilburn, 1986: synonym of Profundisepta voraginosa (Herbert & Kilburn, 1986) (original combination)
- Puncturella (Cranopsis) antillana Pérez Farfante, 1947: synonym of Cranopsis antillana (Pérez Farfante, 1947)
- Puncturella (Cranopsis) asturiana (Fischer, 1882): synonym of Cranopsis asturiana (Fischer, 1882)
- Puncturella (Cranopsis) billsae Pérez Farfante, 1947: synonym of Cranopsis billsae (Pérez Farfante, 1947)
- Puncturella (Cranopsis) granulata (Seguenza, 1863): synonym of Cranopsis granulata (Seguenza, 1863)
- Puncturella (Cranopsis) serraticostata Herbert & Kilburn, 1986: synonym of Cranopsis serraticostata (Herbert & Kilburn, 1986)
- Puncturella (Cranopsis) tosaensis Habe, 1951: synonym of Cranopsis tosaensis (Habe, 1951)
