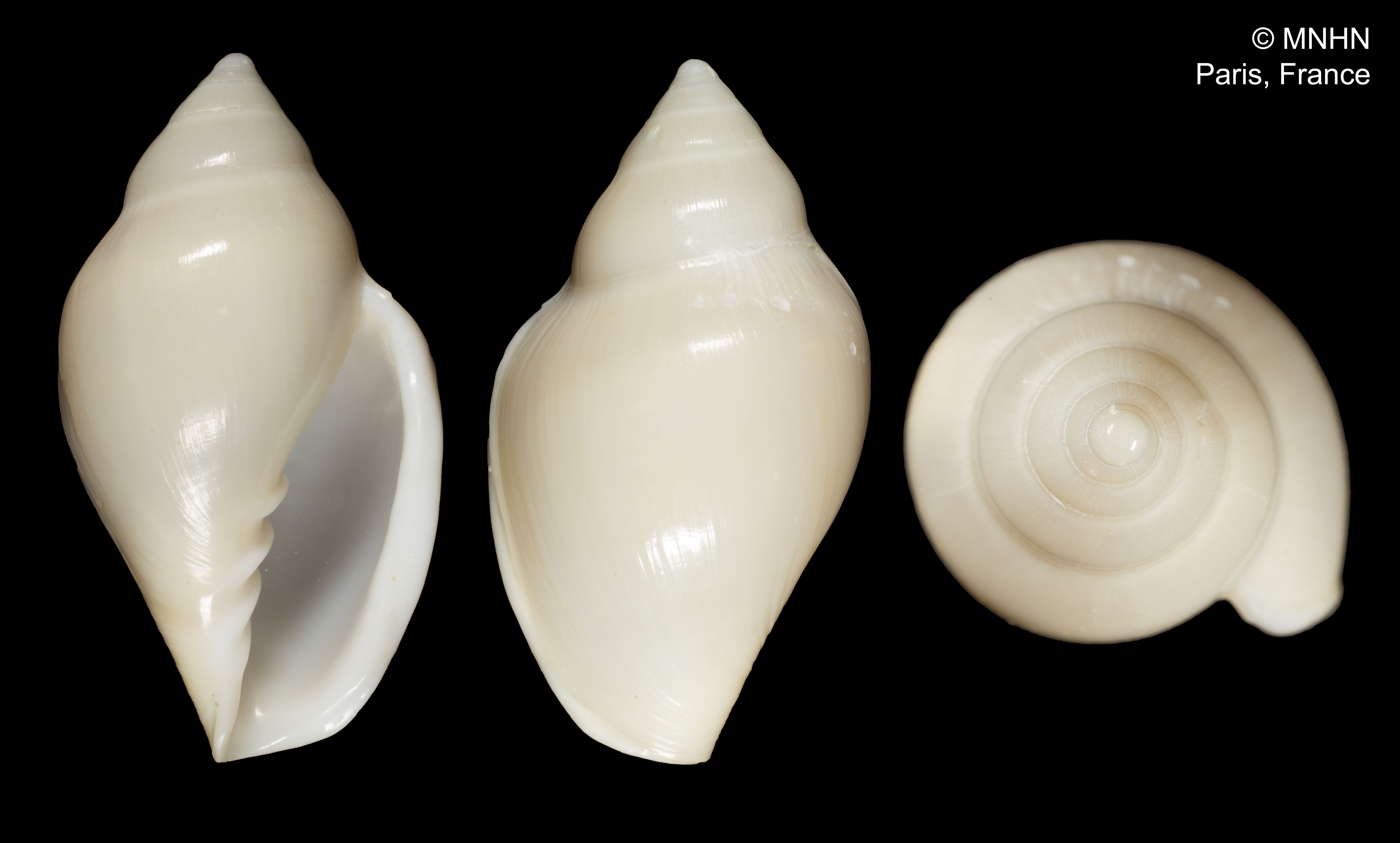

Scientific classification
- Kingdom: Animalia
- Phylum: Mollusca
- Class: Gastropoda
- Subclass: Caenogastropoda
- Order: Neogastropoda
- Family: Marginellidae
- Subfamily: Marginellinae
- Genus: Marginella
- Species: M. impudica

Binomial name
- Marginella impudica P. Fischer, 1883

Synonyms
- Dentimargo impudica (P. Fischer, 1884); Marginella (Semiturriamarginella) impudica P. Fischer, 1884· accepted, alternate representation; Marginella impudica var. elongata Locard, 1897; Marginella impudica var. major Locard, 1897

= Marginella impudica =

Species of gastropod

Marginella impudica is a species of sea snail, a marine gastropod mollusk in the family Marginellidae, the margin snails.

Synonyms

- Marginella impudica var. curta Locard, 1897: synonym of Marginella aronnax Bouchet & Warén, 1985
- Marginella impudica var. elongata Locard, 1897: synonym of Marginella impudica P. Fischer, 1884
- Marginella impudica var. major Locard, 1897: synonym of Marginella impudica P. Fischer, 1884
- Marginella impudica var. marginata Locard, 1897: synonym of Marginella aronnax Bouchet & Warén, 1985
- Marginella impudica var. minor Locard, 1897: synonym of Marginella aronnax Bouchet & Warén, 1985
- Marginella impudica var. subturrita Fischer P., 1884: synonym of Marginella subturrita P Fischer, 1884.

== Distribution ==
This marine species occurs in the Atlantic Ocean off the Sahara.
