= Profundisepta borroi =

Scientific classification
- Kingdom: Animalia
- Phylum: Mollusca
- Class: Gastropoda
- Subclass: Vetigastropoda
- Order: Lepetellida
- Family: Fissurellidae
- Subfamily: Zeidorinae
- Genus: Profundisepta
- Species: P. borroi

Binomial name
- Profundisepta borroi (Pérez Farfante, 1947)

Species of gastropod

Profundisepta borroi is a species of sea snail, a marine gastropod mollusk in the family Fissurellidae, the keyhole limpets and slit limpets.
