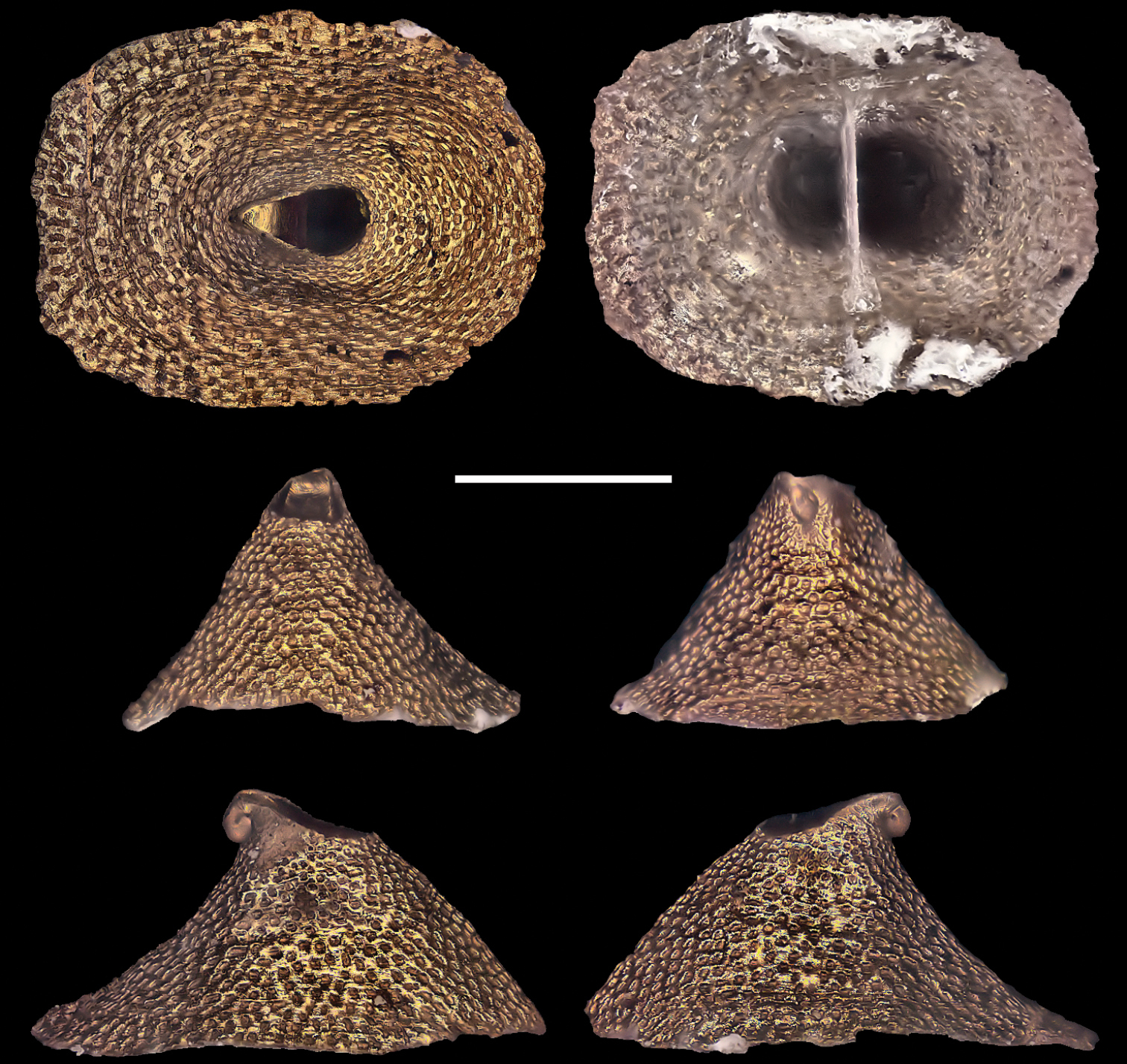
- Profundisepta voraginosa

Scientific classification
- Kingdom: Animalia
- Phylum: Mollusca
- Class: Gastropoda
- Subclass: Vetigastropoda
- Order: Lepetellida
- Superfamily: Fissurelloidea
- Family: Fissurellidae
- Subfamily: Zeidorinae
- Genus: Profundisepta; McLean & Geiger, 1998

Type species
- Puncturella profundi Jeffreys, 1877

= Profundisepta =

Genus of gastropods

Profundisepta is a genus of sea snails, marine gastropod mollusks in the family Fissurellidae, the keyhole limpets.

== Species ==
Species within the genus Profundisepta include:

- Profundisepta alicei (Dautzenberg & Fischer, 1897)
- Profundisepta borroi (Pérez Farfante, 1947)
- Profundisepta circularis (Dall, 1881)
- Profundisepta denudata Simone & Cunha, 2014
- Profundisepta gemmata (Schepman, 1908)
- Profundisepta profundi (Jeffreys, 1877)
- Profundisepta sportella (Watson, 1883)
- Profundisepta voraginosa (Herbert & Kilburn, 1986)
