= Puncturella longifissa =

Scientific classification
- Kingdom: Animalia
- Phylum: Mollusca
- Class: Gastropoda
- Subclass: Vetigastropoda
- Order: Lepetellida
- Family: Fissurellidae
- Subfamily: Zeidorinae
- Genus: Puncturella
- Species: P. longifissa

Binomial name
- Puncturella longifissa Dall, 1914

Species of gastropod

Puncturella longifissa, the long-slot puncturella, is a species of sea snail, a marine gastropod mollusk in the family Fissurellidae, the keyhole limpets and slit limpets.

William Healey Dall described the species in 1914; he found specimens off Bering Island in the Bering Sea. It has also been found off Amchitka and Adak.
