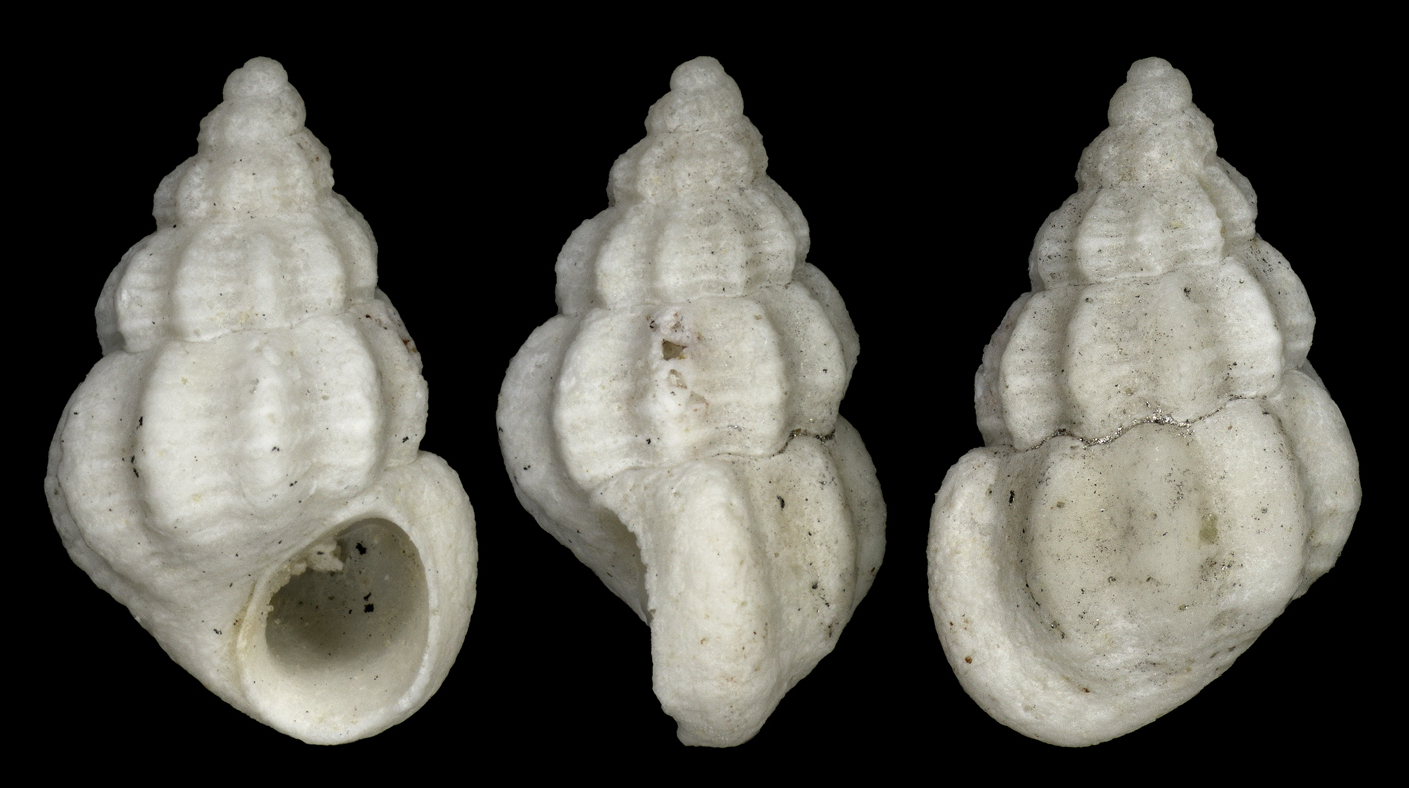
- Shell of Alvania monterosatoi (syntype at MNHN, Paris)

Scientific classification
- Kingdom: Animalia
- Phylum: Mollusca
- Class: Gastropoda
- Subclass: Caenogastropoda
- Order: Littorinimorpha
- Superfamily: Rissooidea
- Family: Rissoidae
- Genus: Alvania
- Species: †A. monterosatoi

Binomial name
- †Alvania monterosatoi (P. Fischer, 1877)

Synonyms
- † Rissoa monterosatoi P. Fischer, 1877 (Alvania accepted as full genus)

= Alvania monterosatoi =

Species of gastropod

Alvania monterosatoi is an extinct species of minute sea snail, a marine gastropod mollusc or micromollusk in the family Rissoidae.

== Description ==
The length of the shell attains 3 mm, its diameter 1.75 mm.

(Original description in Latin) The shell is imperforate, somewhat thick, and conical in shape. It consists of six whorls: the embryonic whorls are smooth, while the succeeding ones are slightly angled and are strongly sculptured with radiating ribs. On the body whorl there are eight such ribs, and the spaces between them are ornamented with spiral lirae.

The final whorl does not reach half the total length of the shell and becomes varicose near the lip. The aperture is ovate and small.

== Distribution ==
Fossils of this marine species were found on the island Rhodes, Greece.
