= Hemimarginula modesta =

Scientific classification
- Kingdom: Animalia
- Phylum: Mollusca
- Class: Gastropoda
- Subclass: Vetigastropoda
- Order: Lepetellida
- Family: Fissurellidae
- Subfamily: Zeidorinae
- Genus: Hemimarginula
- Species: H. modesta

Binomial name
- Hemimarginula modesta (Adams, 1872)

Synonyms
- Emarginula modesta Adams, 1872

Species of gastropod

Hemimarginula modesta is a species of sea snail, a marine gastropod mollusk in the family Fissurellidae, the keyhole limpets and slit limpets.
