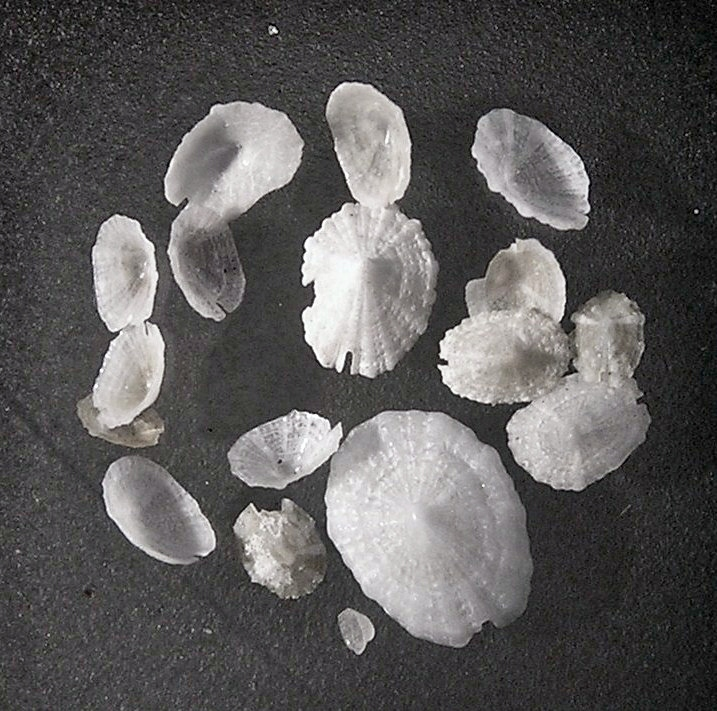
- Shells of Hemimarginula dentigera

Scientific classification
- Kingdom: Animalia
- Phylum: Mollusca
- Class: Gastropoda
- Subclass: Vetigastropoda
- Order: Lepetellida
- Family: Fissurellidae
- Subfamily: Zeidorinae
- Genus: Hemimarginula
- Species: H. dentigera

Binomial name
- Hemimarginula dentigera (Heilprin, 1889)

Synonyms
- Emarginula dentigera Heilprin, 1889

= Hemimarginula dentigera =

Species of gastropod

Hemimarginula dentigera is a species of sea snail, a marine gastropod mollusk in the family Fissurellidae, the keyhole limpets and slit limpets.

== Distribution ==
This species occurs in the following locations:

- Aruba
- Bonaire
- Caribbean Sea
- Curaçao
- Gulf of Mexico
- Venezuela
