= Puncturella pileolus =

Scientific classification
- Kingdom: Animalia
- Phylum: Mollusca
- Class: Gastropoda
- Subclass: Vetigastropoda
- Order: Lepetellida
- Family: Fissurellidae
- Subfamily: Zeidorinae
- Genus: Puncturella
- Species: P. pileolus

Binomial name
- Puncturella pileolus (Adams, 1860)

Synonyms
- Cranopsis pileolus A. Adams, 1860 (original combination)

Species of gastropod

Puncturella pileolus is a species of sea snail, a marine gastropod mollusk in the family Fissurellidae, the keyhole limpets and slit limpets.

The Latin word "pileolus" (masculine diminutive of "pileus") means "felt cap".

== Description ==
The size of the shell varies between 2 mm and 4.5 mm. This species is smaller than Cranopsis pelex, A. Adams, and is laterally compressed. The vertex is subspiral, and posteriorly deflexed so as to reach the hinder margin. The interstices of the radiating ribs or lirae are crossed by transverse or concentric bars placed close together, so as to produce a narrowly clathrate style of sculpture. Many specimens were obtained, all of the same size and character, in company with young and old specimens of Emarginula. When in the young state, the fissure extends as far as the front edge. And when very young, these shells resemble, in respect of the emarginate aperture, species of Emarginula.

== Distribution ==
This marine species occurs off the Philippines and Korea.
