= Hemimarginula subrugosa =

Scientific classification
- Kingdom: Animalia
- Phylum: Mollusca
- Class: Gastropoda
- Subclass: Vetigastropoda
- Order: Lepetellida
- Family: Fissurellidae
- Subfamily: Zeidorinae
- Genus: Hemimarginula
- Species: H. subrugosa

Binomial name
- Hemimarginula subrugosa (Thiele, 1916)

Synonyms
- Emarginula subrugosa Thiele, 1916; Subemarginula subrugosa (Thiele, 1916)

Species of gastropod

Hemimarginula subrugosa is a species of sea snail, a marine gastropod mollusk in the family Fissurellidae, the keyhole limpets and slit limpets.
