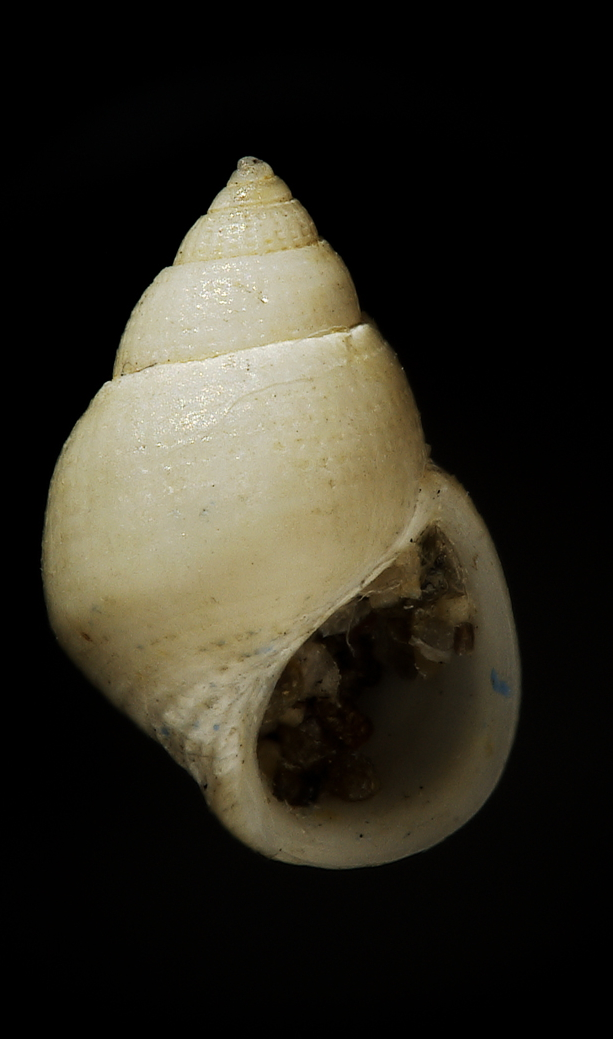
- Shell of Alvania prusi (syntype at MNHN, Paris)

Scientific classification
- Kingdom: Animalia
- Phylum: Mollusca
- Class: Gastropoda
- Subclass: Caenogastropoda
- Order: Littorinimorpha
- Superfamily: Rissooidea
- Family: Rissoidae
- Genus: Alvania
- Species: A. prusi

Binomial name
- Alvania prusi (P. Fischer, 1877)

Synonyms
- Rissoa (Alvania) prusi P. Fischer, 1877 (Alvania accepted as full genus)

= Alvania prusi =

Species of gastropod

Alvania prusi is a species of small sea snail, a marine gastropod mollusk or micromollusk in the family Rissoidae.

== Description ==
The length of the shell attains 5 mm, its diameter is 3.5 mm.

(Original description in Latin) The shell is imperforate, rather thick, and ovate-acuminate. It consists of six slightly convex whorls, which are finely reticulated and marked by minute punctate impressions.

The body whorl is ventricose and bears faint spiral lines composed of small punctate impressions. The basal grooves are distinct and more widely spaced. The aperture is ovate and slightly exceeds half the total shell length.

The peristome is thick, externally thickened, and bordered. The columella is rather stout and curved.

== Distribution ==
This species occurs in the Mediterranean Sea.

Fossils were found on the island of Rhodes.
