= Hemimarginula pileum =

Scientific classification
- Kingdom: Animalia
- Phylum: Mollusca
- Class: Gastropoda
- Subclass: Vetigastropoda
- Order: Lepetellida
- Family: Fissurellidae
- Subfamily: Zeidorinae
- Genus: Hemimarginula
- Species: H. pileum

Binomial name
- Hemimarginula pileum (Heilprin, 1889)

Synonyms
- Emarginula pileum Heilprin, 1889

Species of gastropod

Hemimarginula pileum is a species of sea snail, a marine gastropod mollusk in the family Fissurellidae, the keyhole limpets and slit limpets.
