= Rimulanax =

Scientific classification
- Kingdom: Animalia
- Phylum: Mollusca
- Class: Gastropoda
- Subclass: Vetigastropoda
- Order: Lepetellida
- Superfamily: Fissurelloidea
- Family: Fissurellidae
- Subfamily: Emarginulinae
- Genus: Rimulanax; Iredale, 1924

Type species
- Puncturella corolla Verco, 1908

Synonyms
- Puncturella (Rimulanax) Iredale, 1924

Genus of gastropods

Rimulanax is a genus of sea snails, marine gastropod mollusks in the family Fissurellidae, the keyhole limpets and slit limpets.

This genus is a taxon inquerendum and is possibly a synonym of Puncturella. Cunha et al. 2019 sequenced material of Puncturella aff. corolla and this clustered within Puncturella suggesting that Rimulanax is not distinct from Puncturella and that it is referable to the Zeidorinae.

== Species ==
Species within the genus Rimulanax include:

- Rimulanax aethiopica (E. von Martens, 1902)
- Rimulanax corolla (Verco, 1908)
