= Hemimarginula simpla =

Scientific classification
- Kingdom: Animalia
- Phylum: Mollusca
- Class: Gastropoda
- Subclass: Vetigastropoda
- Order: Lepetellida
- Family: Fissurellidae
- Subfamily: Zeidorinae
- Genus: Hemimarginula
- Species: H. simpla

Binomial name
- Hemimarginula simpla (Christiaens, 1987)

Synonyms
- Emarginula simpla Christiaens, 1987

Species of gastropod

Hemimarginula simpla is a species of sea snail, a marine gastropod mollusk in the family Fissurellidae, the keyhole limpets and slit limpets.
