= Puncturella cooperi =

Scientific classification
- Kingdom: Animalia
- Phylum: Mollusca
- Class: Gastropoda
- Subclass: Vetigastropoda
- Order: Lepetellida
- Family: Fissurellidae
- Subfamily: Zeidorinae
- Genus: Puncturella
- Species: P. cooperi

Binomial name
- Puncturella cooperi Carpenter, 1864

Species of gastropod

Puncturella cooperi is a species of sea snail, a marine gastropod mollusk in the family Fissurellidae, the keyhole limpets and slit limpets.
