= Hemimarginula biangulata =

Scientific classification
- Kingdom: Animalia
- Phylum: Mollusca
- Class: Gastropoda
- Subclass: Vetigastropoda
- Order: Lepetellida
- Family: Fissurellidae
- Subfamily: Zeidorinae
- Genus: Hemimarginula
- Species: H. biangulata

Binomial name
- Hemimarginula biangulata (Sowerby III, 1901)

Synonyms
- Emarginella biangulata (Sowerby III, 1901); Emarginula biangulata Sowerby III, 1901 (original combination)

Species of gastropod

Hemimarginula biangulata is a species of sea snail, a marine gastropod mollusk in the family Fissurellidae, the keyhole limpets and slit limpets.
