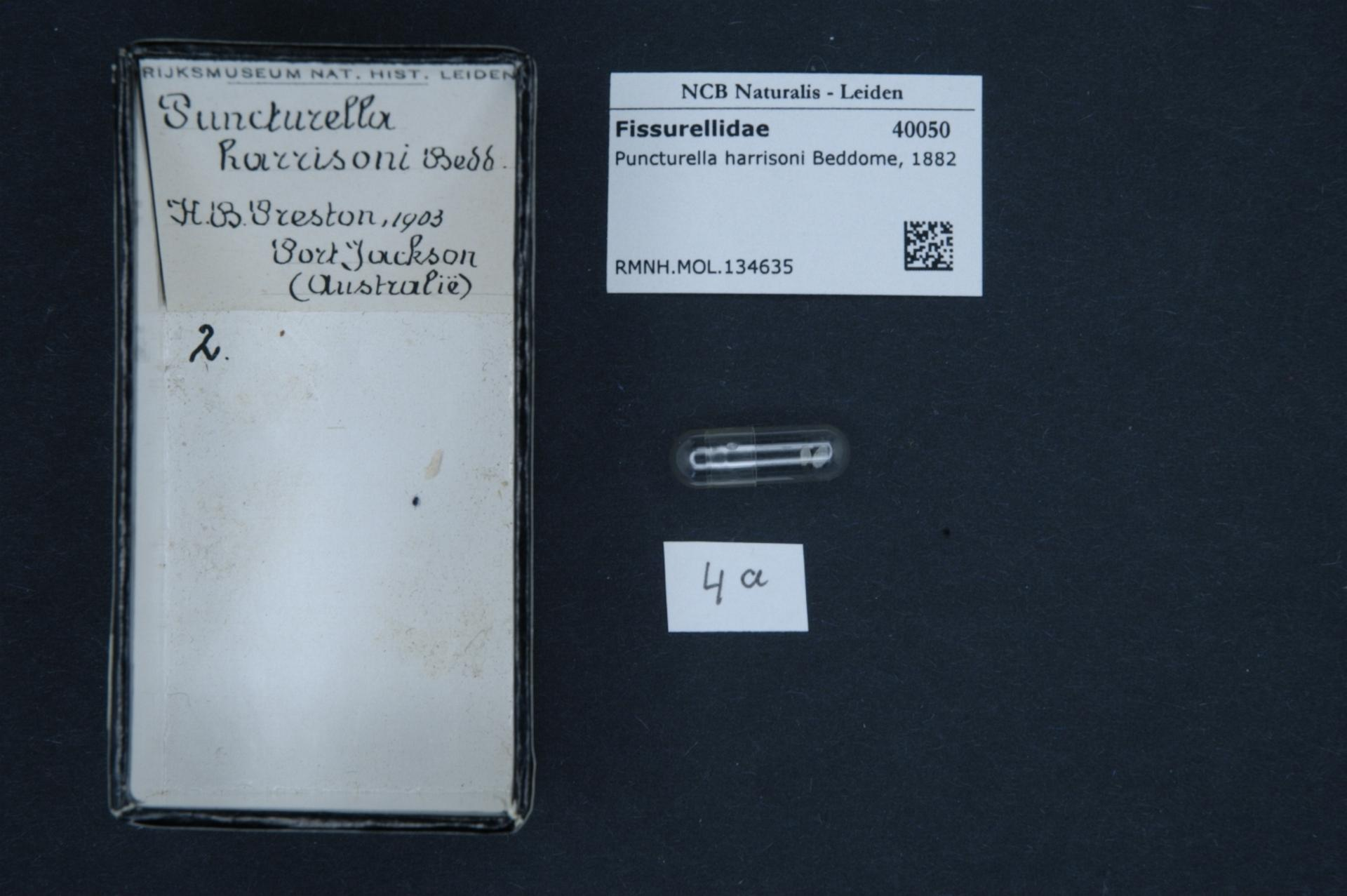
- Puncturella harrisoni Beddome, 1882

Scientific classification
- Kingdom: Animalia
- Phylum: Mollusca
- Class: Gastropoda
- Subclass: Vetigastropoda
- Order: Lepetellida
- Family: Fissurellidae
- Subfamily: Zeidorinae
- Genus: Puncturella
- Species: P. harrisoni

Binomial name
- Puncturella harrisoni Beddome, 1883

Synonyms
- Puncturella henniana Brazier, 1894

= Puncturella harrisoni =

Species of gastropod

Puncturella harrisoni is a species of sea snail, a marine gastropod mollusk in the family Fissurellidae, the keyhole limpets and slit limpets.
