= Montfortulana eurythma =

Scientific classification
- Kingdom: Animalia
- Phylum: Mollusca
- Class: Gastropoda
- Subclass: Vetigastropoda
- Order: Lepetellida
- Family: Fissurellidae
- Subfamily: Zeidorinae
- Genus: Montfortulana
- Species: M. eurythma

Binomial name
- Montfortulana eurythma (Dautzenberg, 1907)

Synonyms
- Subemarginula eurythma Dautzenberg, 1907

Species of gastropod

Montfortulana eurythma is a species of sea snail, a marine gastropod mollusk in the family Fissurellidae, the keyhole limpets and slit limpets.
