= Montfortulana sulcifera =

Scientific classification
- Kingdom: Animalia
- Phylum: Mollusca
- Class: Gastropoda
- Subclass: Vetigastropoda
- Order: Lepetellida
- Family: Fissurellidae
- Subfamily: Zeidorinae
- Genus: Montfortulana
- Species: M. sulcifera

Binomial name
- Montfortulana sulcifera (Adams, 1852)

Synonyms
- Clypidina sulcifera (Adams, 1852); Emarginula sulcifera Adams, 1852

Species of gastropod

Montfortulana sulcifera is a species of sea snail, a marine gastropod mollusk in the family Fissurellidae, the keyhole limpets and slit limpets.
