= Puncturella rimaizenaensis =

Scientific classification
- Kingdom: Animalia
- Phylum: Mollusca
- Class: Gastropoda
- Subclass: Vetigastropoda
- Order: Lepetellida
- Family: Fissurellidae
- Subfamily: Zeidorinae
- Genus: Puncturella
- Species: P. rimaizenaensis

Binomial name
- Puncturella rimaizenaensis Okutani, Fujikura & Sasaki, 1993

Species of gastropod

Puncturella rimaizenaensis is a species of sea snail, a marine gastropod mollusk in the family Fissurellidae, the keyhole limpets and slit limpets.
