= Puncturella solis =

Scientific classification
- Kingdom: Animalia
- Phylum: Mollusca
- Class: Gastropoda
- Subclass: Vetigastropoda
- Order: Lepetellida
- Family: Fissurellidae
- Subfamily: Zeidorinae
- Genus: Puncturella
- Species: P. solis

Binomial name
- Puncturella solis Beck, 1996

Species of gastropod

Puncturella solis is a species of sea snail, a marine gastropod mollusk in the family Fissurellidae, the keyhole limpets and slit limpets. They can be found in the Manus Back Arc Basin in Bismarck Sea, Papua New Guinea. Puncturella solis are considered critically endangered.
