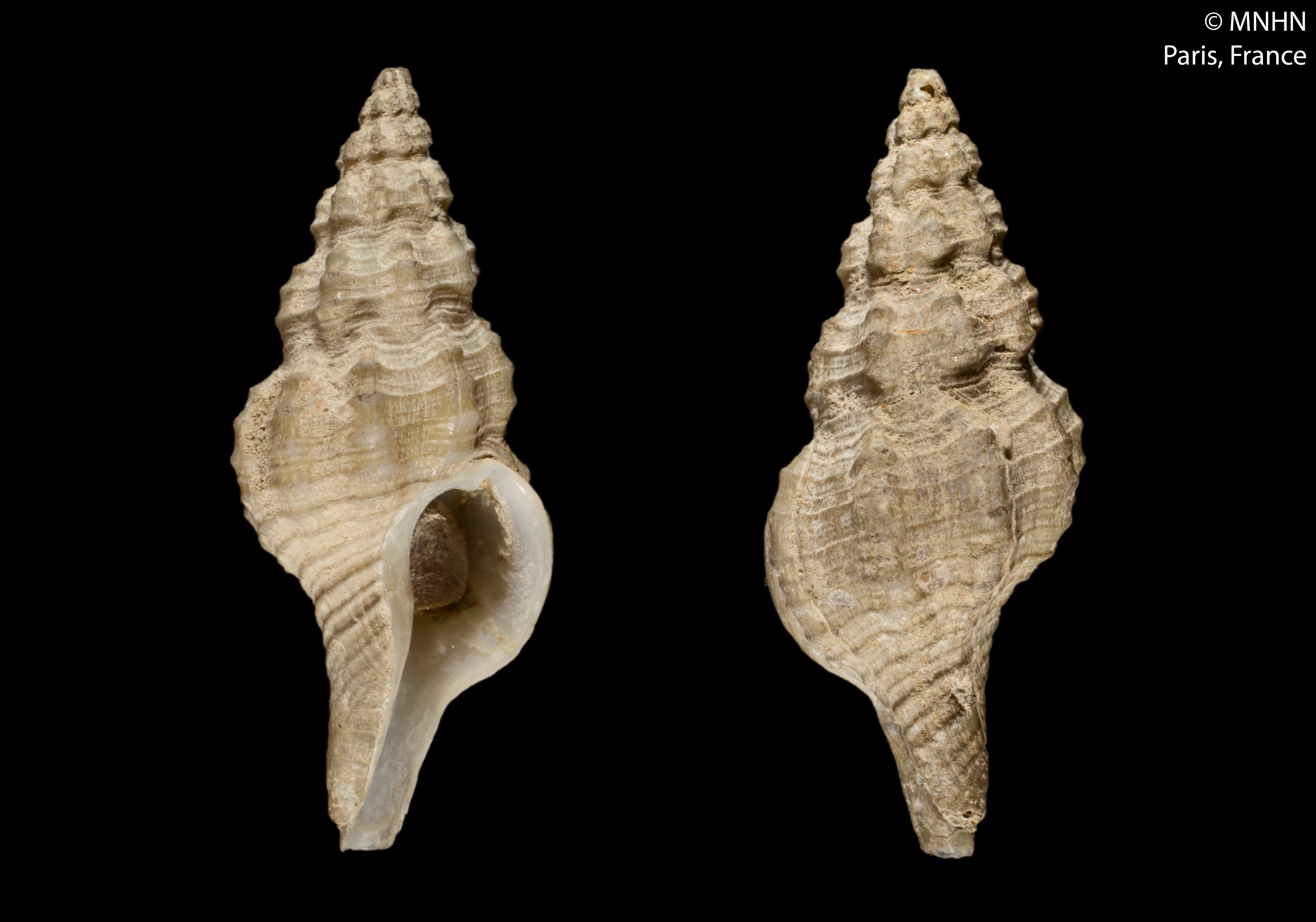

Scientific classification
- Kingdom: Animalia
- Phylum: Mollusca
- Class: Gastropoda
- Subclass: Caenogastropoda
- Order: Neogastropoda
- Family: Fasciolariidae
- Genus: Fusinus
- Species: F. bocagei

Binomial name
- Fusinus bocagei (P. Fischer, 1882)

Synonyms
- Fusus azoricus Dautzenberg, 1889; Fusus bocagei Fischer von Waldheim, 1882 (original combination); Fusus bocagei var. ecaudata Locard, 1897; Fusus bocagei var. longicaduata Locard, 1897; Fusus bocagei var. major Locard, 1897; Fusus bocagei var. minor Locard, 1897

= Fusinus bocagei =

Species of gastropod

Fusinus bocagei is a species of sea snail, a marine gastropod mollusk in the family Fasciolariidae, the spindle snails, the tulip snails and their allies.

Subspecies

- Fusinus bocagei bocagei (P. Fischer, 1882)
- Fusinus bocagei marcelpini Hadorn & Ryall, 1999

== Distribution ==
This species occurs in the Atlantic Ocean off the Iberian Peninsula.
