= Puncturella larva =

Scientific classification
- Kingdom: Animalia
- Phylum: Mollusca
- Class: Gastropoda
- Subclass: Vetigastropoda
- Order: Lepetellida
- Family: Fissurellidae
- Subfamily: Zeidorinae
- Genus: Puncturella
- Species: P. larva

Binomial name
- Puncturella larva (Dall, 1927)

Synonyms
- Cranopsis larva (Dall, 1927); Emarginula (Rimula) larva Dall, 1927 (basionym); Emarginula (Rimula) larva Dall, 1927 (original combination)

Species of gastropod

Puncturella larva is a species of sea snail, a marine gastropod mollusk in the family Fissurellidae, the keyhole limpets and slit limpets.

== Taxonomy ==
The species was originally described by the American malacologist William Healey Dall in 1927 as Emarginula (Rimula) larva, in his account of small shells dredged off the southeastern United States by the fisheries steamer Albatross. It was later transferred to the genus Puncturella. The genus Cranopsis, under which the species has also been listed (as Cranopsis larva), was synonymised with Puncturella by Cunha and colleagues in 2019.

== Description ==
The size of the shell reaches 3 mm.

== Distribution ==
This species occurs in the Atlantic Ocean off Georgia, USA.
