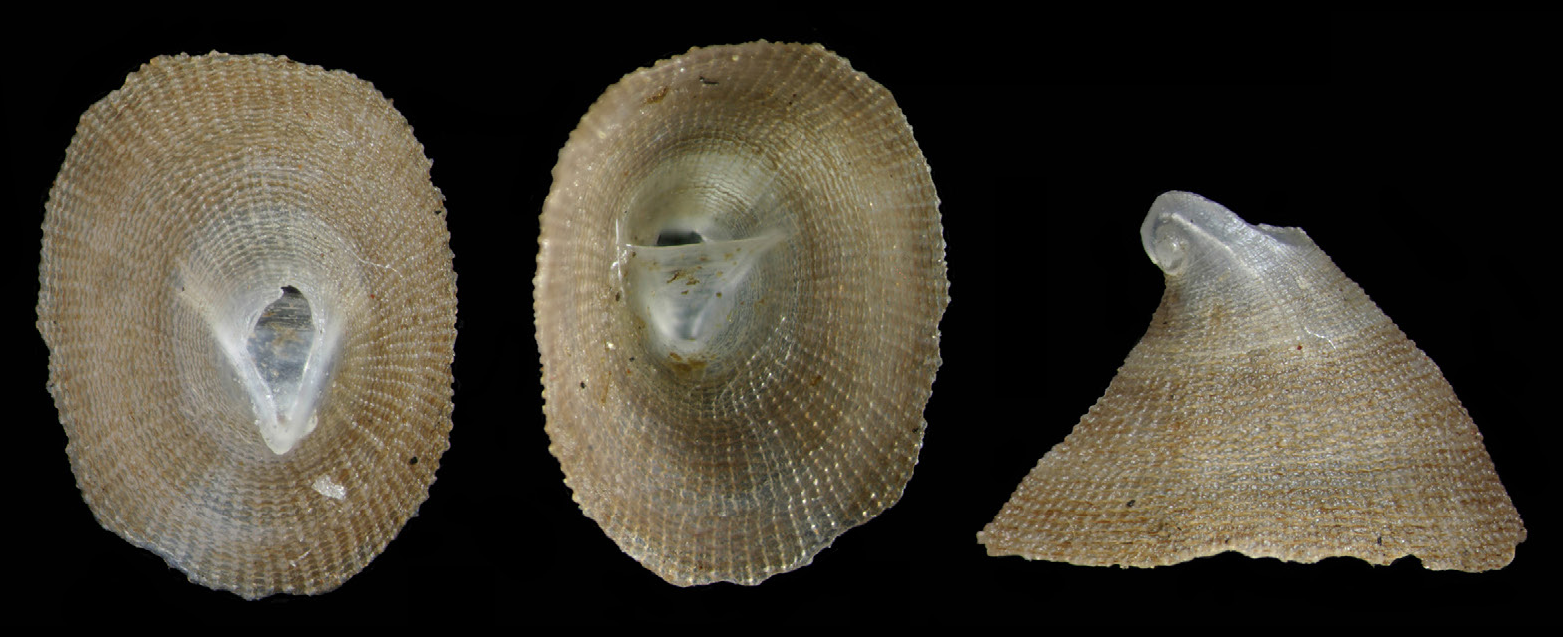

Scientific classification
- Kingdom: Animalia
- Phylum: Mollusca
- Class: Gastropoda
- Subclass: Vetigastropoda
- Order: Lepetellida
- Family: Fissurellidae
- Genus: Profundisepta
- Species: P. profundi

Binomial name
- Profundisepta profundi (Jeffreys, 1877)

Synonyms
- Fissurisepta profundi (Jeffreys, 1877); Puncturella profundi Jeffreys, 1877 (basionym)

= Profundisepta profundi =

Species of gastropod

Profundisepta profundi is a species of sea snail, a marine gastropod mollusk in the family Fissurellidae, the keyhole limpets.

== Description ==
The shell size varies between 3 mm and 6 mm, and features a hole at or near the top of the shell. The height of the shell is shorter than its width and a sculpture of granular riblets radiate from the apex, both of which help distinguish the species from the related P. alicei, which has a smooth shell taller than it is wide.

Mosquera et al. (1981) and Mosquera (1983) misidentified a Puncturella agger specimen as belonging to this species (then called Puncturella profundi). While P. agger shares the radial rows of granules with Profundisepta profundi, it is distinct in that there is a slit, rather than a hole, near the top of the shell, stretching from the apex to the anterior edge.

== Distribution ==
This species is distributed in the Northern Atlantic Ocean along Iceland and Greenland.
