= Puncturella cucullata =

Scientific classification
- Kingdom: Animalia
- Phylum: Mollusca
- Class: Gastropoda
- Subclass: Vetigastropoda
- Order: Lepetellida
- Family: Fissurellidae
- Subfamily: Zeidorinae
- Genus: Puncturella
- Species: P. cucullata

Binomial name
- Puncturella cucullata (Gould, 1846)

Synonyms
- Cranopsis cucullata (Gould, 1846); Puncturella (Cranopsis) cucullata Gould, 1846; Rimula cucullata Gould, 1846 (original combination)

Species of gastropod

Puncturella cucullata, common name the hooded keyhole limpet, is a species of sea snail, a marine gastropod mollusk in the family Fissurellidae, the keyhole limpets and slit limpets.

== Description ==
The size of the shell varies between 13 mm and 28 mm.

== Distribution ==
This marine species occurs from Alaska to Baja California, Mexico.
