= Montfortulana =

Scientific classification
- Kingdom: Animalia
- Phylum: Mollusca
- Class: Gastropoda
- Subclass: Vetigastropoda
- Order: Lepetellida
- Family: Fissurellidae
- Subfamily: Zeidorinae
- Genus: Montfortulana; Habe, 1961

Type species
- Subemarginula eurythma Dautzenberg, 1907

Genus of gastropods

Montfortulana is a genus of sea snails, marine gastropod mollusks in the family Fissurellidae, the keyhole limpets and slit limpets.

== Species ==
Species within the genus Montfortulana include:

- Montfortulana eurythma (Dautzenberg, 1907)
- Montfortulana sulcifera (Adams, 1852)
