= Puncturella antillana =

Scientific classification
- Kingdom: Animalia
- Phylum: Mollusca
- Class: Gastropoda
- Subclass: Vetigastropoda
- Order: Lepetellida
- Family: Fissurellidae
- Genus: Puncturella
- Species: P. antillana

Binomial name
- Puncturella antillana Pérez Farfante, 1947

Synonyms
- Cranopsis antillana (Pérez Farfante, 1947); Puncturella (Cranopsis) antillana Pérez Farfante, 1947

Species of gastropod

Puncturella antillana is a species of sea snail, a marine gastropod mollusk in the family Fissurellidae, the keyhole limpets.

== Description ==
The size of the shell reaches 15 mm.

== Distribution ==
This marine species occurs off Cuba, the Virgin Islands, St Thomas, Martinique and Brazil; on the Mid-Atlantic Ridge.
