= Puncturella fastigiata =

Scientific classification
- Kingdom: Animalia
- Phylum: Mollusca
- Class: Gastropoda
- Subclass: Vetigastropoda
- Order: Lepetellida
- Family: Fissurellidae
- Genus: Puncturella
- Species: P. fastigiata

Binomial name
- Puncturella fastigiata Adams, 1853

Synonyms
- Cemoria fastigiata A. Adams, 1853

Species of gastropod

Puncturella fastigiata is a species of sea snail, a marine gastropod mollusk in the family Fissurellidae, the keyhole limpets and slit limpets.

== Habitat ==
This species is found in the following habitats:

- Brackish
- Marine
