= Puncturella conica =

Scientific classification
- Kingdom: Animalia
- Phylum: Mollusca
- Class: Gastropoda
- Subclass: Vetigastropoda
- Order: Lepetellida
- Family: Fissurellidae
- Genus: Puncturella
- Species: P. conica

Binomial name
- Puncturella conica (d'Orbigny, 1841)

Species of gastropod

Puncturella conica is a species of sea snail, a marine gastropod mollusk in the family Fissurellidae, the keyhole limpets.
