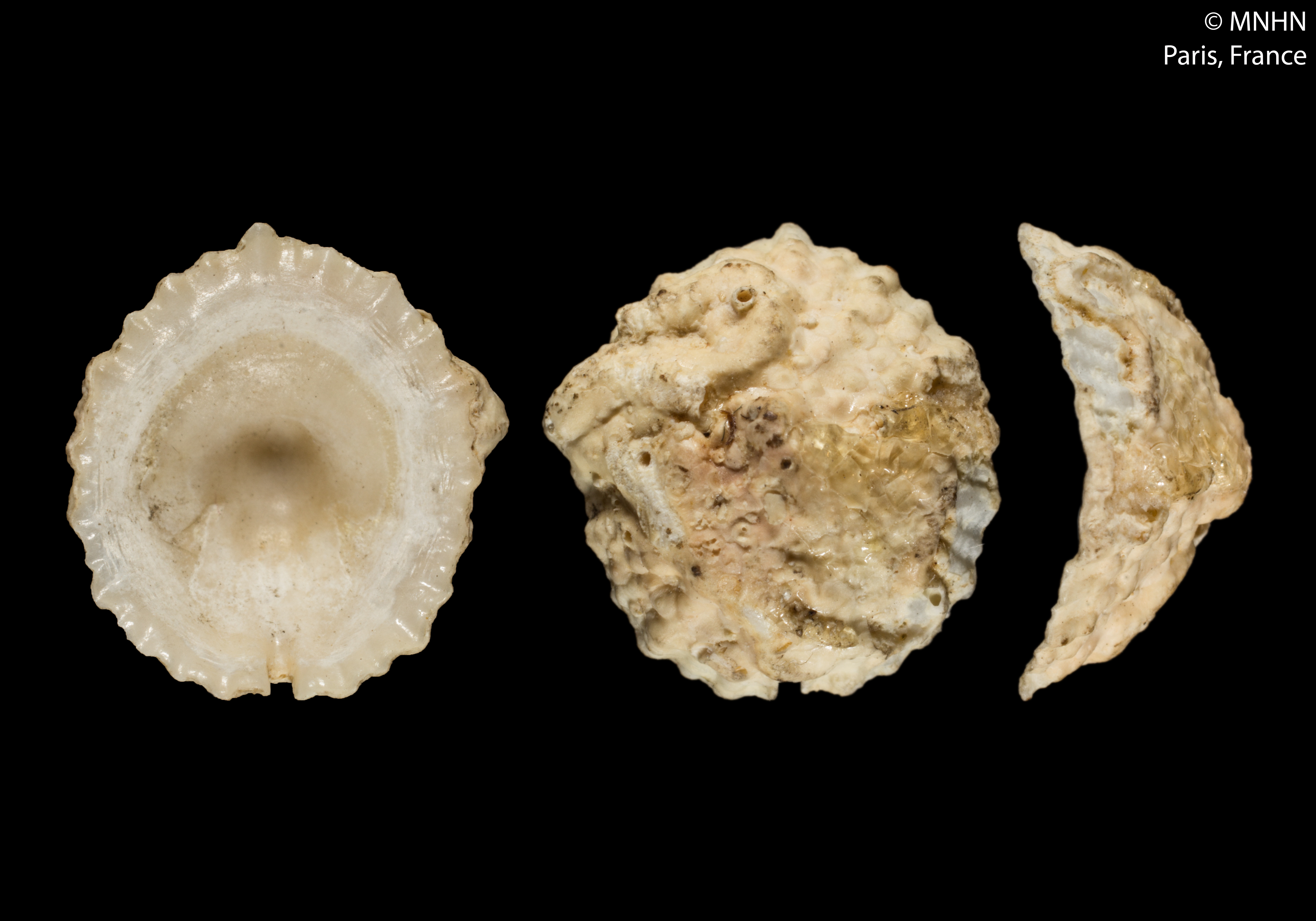
- Shell of Hemimarginula pumila (syntype at MNHN, Paris)

Scientific classification
- Kingdom: Animalia
- Phylum: Mollusca
- Class: Gastropoda
- Subclass: Vetigastropoda
- Order: Lepetellida
- Family: Fissurellidae
- Genus: Hemimarginula
- Species: H. pumila

Binomial name
- Hemimarginula pumila Adams, 1852

Synonyms
- Emarginula pumila Adams, 1852; Emarginula rollandi P. Fischer, 1857; Emarginula tumida G. B. Sowerby II, 1874 (junior synonym)

= Hemimarginula pumila =

Species of gastropod

Hemimarginula pumila, the pygmy ermarginula, is a species of sea snail, a marine gastropod mollusk in the family Fissurellidae, the keyhole limpets.

== Description ==
The whitish to pale brownish conical shell is 6 to 13 mm long on a broadly oval base with an irregularly scalloped margin. The height is variable and the shell is usually much depressed. The apex is nearly centrally located. There is a narrow exhalant slit at the front margin. There are about twelve broad ribs that are minutely scabrous. These ribs are crossed by three buff, radiating bands. The radiating ribs are distant and corrugated. The interstices are deeply latticed and corrugated.

== Distribution and habitat ==
This keyhole limpet is fairly common and can be found on or under rocks in tide pools, shallow water and in the intertidal to the sublittoral zone (from 2m to 27 m deep) along the coasts of Southeastern Florida south to Brazil. They can also be found living on mangrove oysters.

This species occurs in the following locations:

- Aruba
- Belize
- Bonaire
- Caribbean Sea
- Cayman Islands
- Colombia
- Cuba
- Curaçao
- Gulf of Mexico
- Hispaniola
- Jamaica
- Lesser Antilles
- Mexico
- Panama
- Puerto Rico
