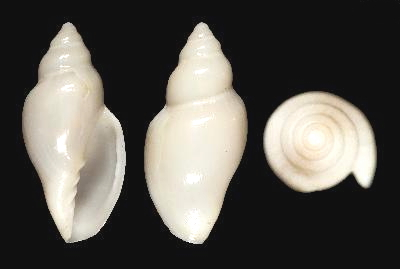
- Shell of Marginella subturrita (lectotype in MNHN, Paris)

Scientific classification
- Kingdom: Animalia
- Phylum: Mollusca
- Class: Gastropoda
- Subclass: Caenogastropoda
- Order: Neogastropoda
- Family: Marginellidae
- Genus: Marginella
- Species: M. subturrita

Binomial name
- Marginella subturrita P. Fischer, 1884

Synonyms
- Dentimargo subturrita (P. Fischer, 1884); Marginella impudica var. subturrita Fischer P., 1884; Marginella jousseaumei Locard, 1897

= Marginella subturrita =

Species of gastropod

Marginella subturrita is a species of sea snail, a marine gastropod mollusk in the family Marginellidae, the margin snails.
