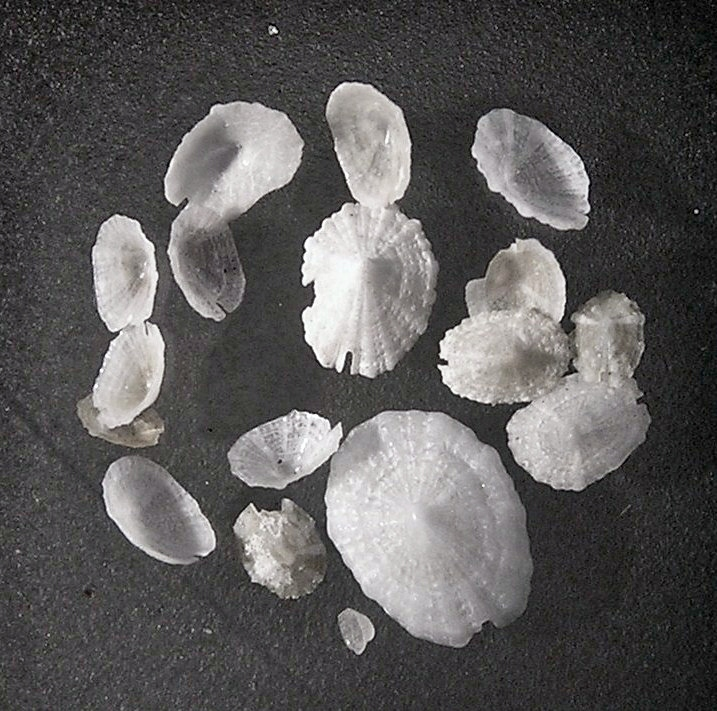
- Shells of Hemimarginula dentigera

Scientific classification
- Kingdom: Animalia
- Phylum: Mollusca
- Class: Gastropoda
- Subclass: Vetigastropoda
- Order: Lepetellida
- Family: Fissurellidae
- Subfamily: Zeidorinae
- Genus: Hemimarginula; McLean, 2011

Type species
- Emarginula dentigera Heilprin, 1889

= Hemimarginula =

Genus of gastropods

Hemimarginula is a genus of sea snails, marine gastropod mollusks in the family Fissurellidae, the keyhole limpets and slit limpets.

== Species ==
Species within the genus Hemimarginula include:

- Hemimarginula biangulata (Sowerby III, 1901)
- Hemimarginula dentigera (Heilprin, 1889)
- Hemimarginula hemitoma Simone & Cunha, 2014
- Hemimarginula modesta (Adams, 1872)
- Hemimarginula pileum (Heilprin, 1889)
- Hemimarginula pumila (Adams, 1852)
- Hemimarginula simpla (Christiaens, 1987)
- Hemimarginula subrugosa (Thiele, 1916)
