= Puncturella piccirida =

Scientific classification
- Kingdom: Animalia
- Phylum: Mollusca
- Class: Gastropoda
- Subclass: Vetigastropoda
- Order: Lepetellida
- Family: Fissurellidae
- Genus: Puncturella
- Species: P. piccirida

Binomial name
- Puncturella piccirida Palazzi & Villari, 2001

Species of gastropod

Puncturella piccirida is a species of sea snail, a marine gastropod mollusk in the family Fissurellidae, the keyhole limpets.
