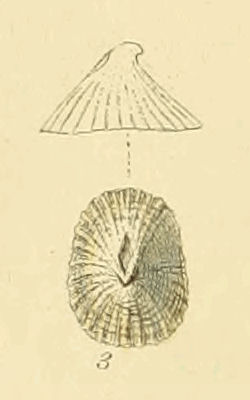
- Puncturella noachina shell

Scientific classification
- Kingdom: Animalia
- Phylum: Mollusca
- Class: Gastropoda
- Subclass: Vetigastropoda
- Order: Lepetellida
- Family: Fissurellidae
- Genus: Puncturella
- Species: P. noachina

Binomial name
- Puncturella noachina (Linnaeus, 1771)

Synonyms
- Cremoria princeps Mighels & Adams, 1842; Patella noachina Linnaeus, 1771

= Puncturella noachina =

Species of gastropod

Puncturella noachina, common name the diluvian puncturella, is a species of sea snail, a marine gastropod mollusk in the family Fissurellidae, the keyhole limpets.
