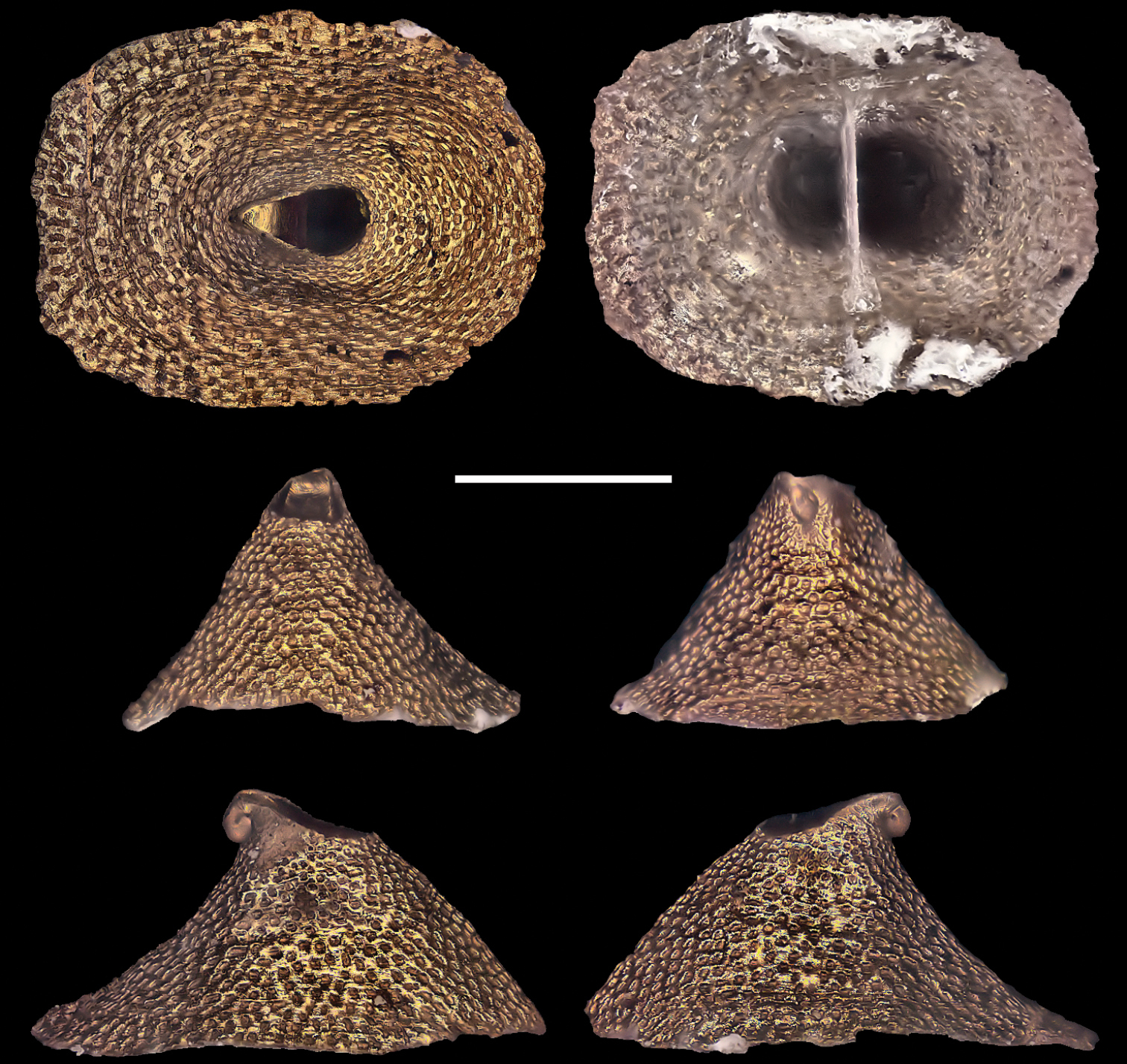

Scientific classification
- Kingdom: Animalia
- Phylum: Mollusca
- Class: Gastropoda
- Subclass: Vetigastropoda
- Order: Lepetellida
- Family: Fissurellidae
- Subfamily: Zeidorinae
- Genus: Profundisepta
- Species: P. voraginosa

Binomial name
- Profundisepta voraginosa (Herbert & Kilburn, 1986)

Synonyms
- Puncturella (Puncturella) voraginosa Herbert & Kilburn, 1986 (basionym); Puncturella voraginosa Herbert & Kilburn, 1986 (original combination)

= Profundisepta voraginosa =

Species of gastropod

Profundisepta voraginosa is a species of sea snail, a marine gastropod mollusk in the family Fissurellidae, the keyhole limpets and slit limpets.

== Distribution ==
This marine species occurs off Natal, South Africa.
