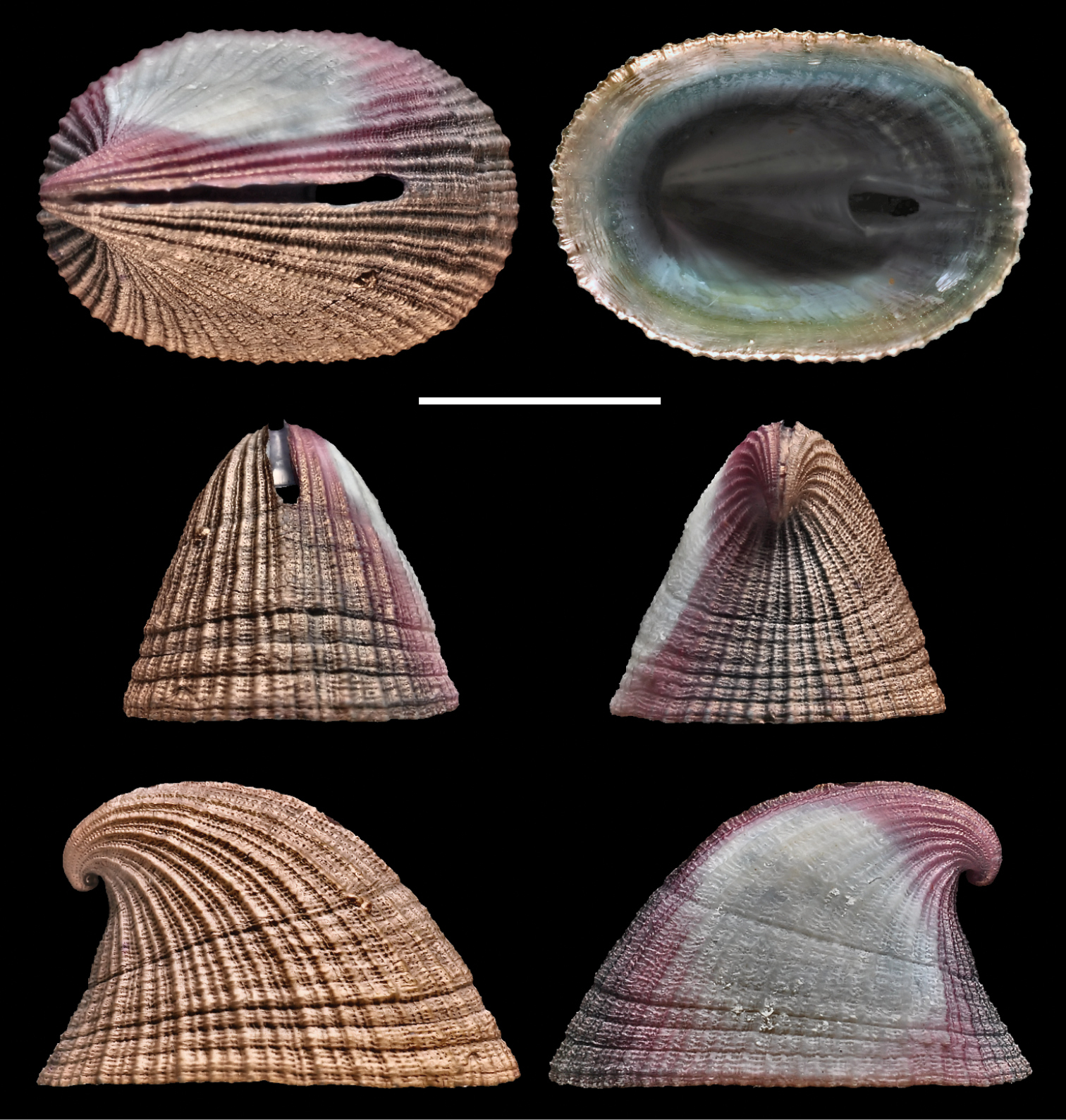

Scientific classification
- Kingdom: Animalia
- Phylum: Mollusca
- Class: Gastropoda
- Subclass: Vetigastropoda
- Order: Lepetellida
- Family: Fissurellidae
- Subfamily: Zeidorinae
- Genus: Puncturella
- Species: P. serraticostata

Binomial name
- Puncturella serraticostata (Herbert & Kilburn, 1986)

Synonyms
- Cranopsis serraticosta (Herbert & Kilburn, 1986); Puncturella (Cranopsis) serraticostata Herbert & Kilburn, 1986

= Puncturella serraticosta =

Species of gastropod

Puncturella serraticostata is a species of sea snail, a marine gastropod mollusk in the family Fissurellidae, the keyhole limpets and slit limpets.

== Distribution ==
This marine species occurs off KwaZulu-Natal, South Africa.
