= Puncturella decorata =

Scientific classification
- Kingdom: Animalia
- Phylum: Mollusca
- Class: Gastropoda
- Subclass: Vetigastropoda
- Order: Lepetellida
- Family: Fissurellidae
- Subfamily: Zeidorinae
- Genus: Puncturella
- Species: P. decorata

Binomial name
- Puncturella decorata Cowan & McLean, 1968

Synonyms
- Cranopsis decorata (Cowan & McLean, 1968)

Species of gastropod

Puncturella decorata is a species of sea snail, a marine gastropod mollusk in the family Fissurellidae, the keyhole limpets and slit limpets.

== Distribution ==
This species occurs in the Pacific Ocean off British Columbia, Canada.
