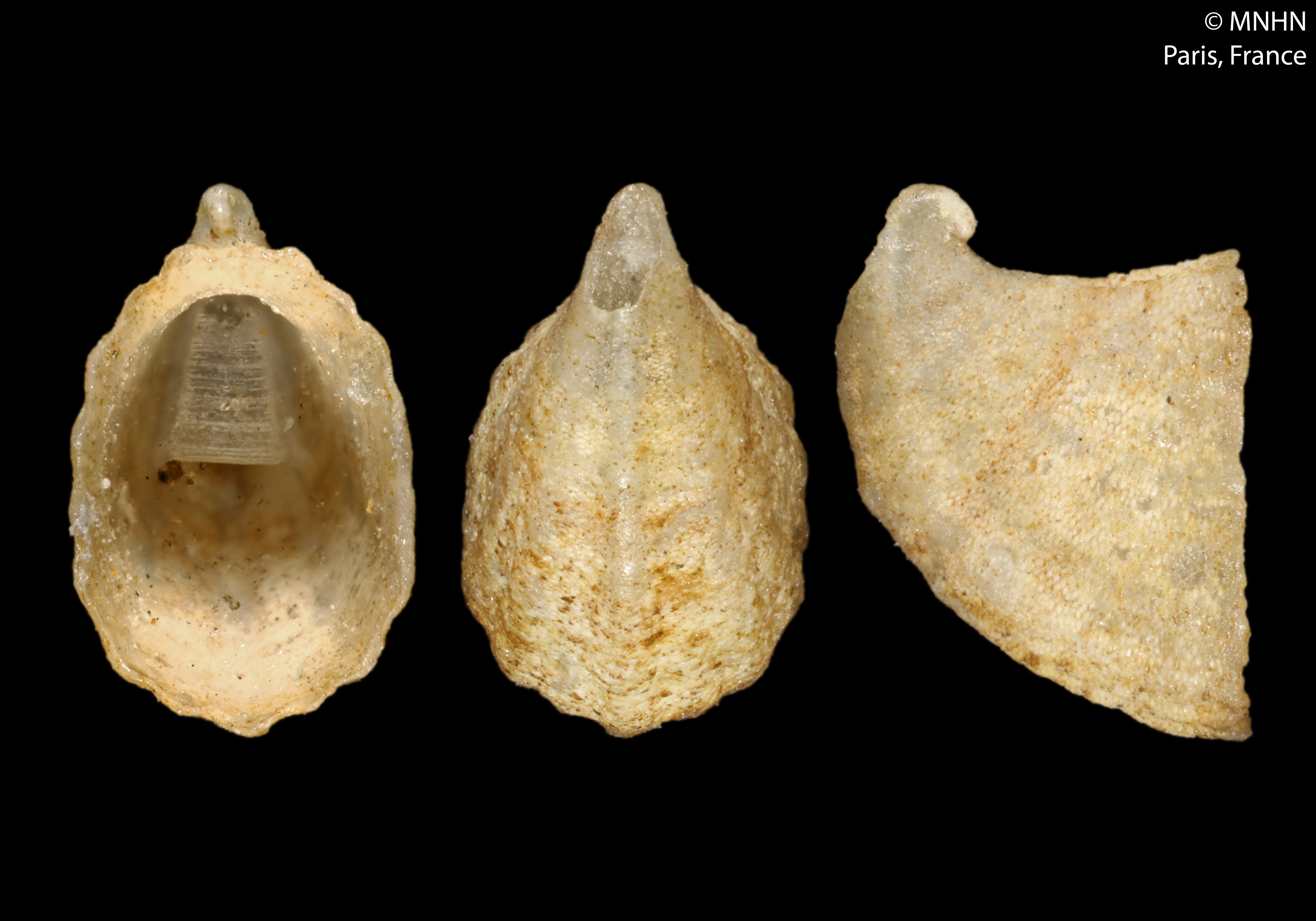
- Shell of Vacerrena nana

Scientific classification
- Kingdom: Animalia
- Phylum: Mollusca
- Class: Gastropoda
- Subclass: Vetigastropoda
- Order: Lepetellida
- Family: Fissurellidae
- Subfamily: Emarginulinae
- Genus: Vacerrena; Iredale, 1958

Type species
- Puncturella demissa Hedley, 1904

Synonyms
- Puncturella (Vacerrena) Iredale, 1958; Vacerra Iredale, 1924 (junior homonym of Vacerra Godman, 1900 in Lepidoptera; Vacerrena was the replacement name)

= Vacerrena =

Genus of gastropods

Vacerrena is a small genus of sea snails in the family Fissurellidae, the keyhole limpets and slit limpets.

== Species ==
Species within the genus Vacerrena include:

- Vacerrena kesteveni (Hedley, 1900)
- Vacerrena nana (H. Adams, 1872)
