= Puncturella asturiana =

Scientific classification
- Kingdom: Animalia
- Phylum: Mollusca
- Class: Gastropoda
- Subclass: Vetigastropoda
- Order: Lepetellida
- Family: Fissurellidae
- Genus: Puncturella
- Species: P. asturiana

Binomial name
- Puncturella asturiana (P. Fischer, 1882)

Synonyms
- Cranopsis asturiana (P. Fischer, 1882); Puncturella (Cranopsis) asturiana (P. Fischer, 1882); Puncturella asturiana var. alta Locard, 1898; Puncturella craticia R. B. Watson, 1883 (unavailable name: introduced in synonymy and never used as valid); Rimula asturiana P. Fischer, 1882 (original combination)

Species of gastropod

Puncturella asturiana, common name the hawk puncturella, is a species of sea snail, a marine gastropod mollusk in the family Fissurellidae, the keyhole limpets.

== Description ==
The shell can grow to be 15 mm to 25 mm in length.

== Distribution ==
This species occurs in European waters (off Spain), the Caribbean Sea and the Gulf of Mexico; the Atlantic Ocean off North Carolina, Georgia and Florida. It lives at a depth of 182 m to 2017 m.
