= Puncturella abyssicola =

Scientific classification
- Kingdom: Animalia
- Phylum: Mollusca
- Class: Gastropoda
- Subclass: Vetigastropoda
- Order: Lepetellida
- Family: Fissurellidae
- Genus: Puncturella
- Species: P. abyssicola

Binomial name
- Puncturella abyssicola Verrill, 1885

Species of gastropod

Puncturella abyssicola is a species of small deepwater keyhole limpet, a marine gastropod mollusks or micromollusk in the family Fissurellidae, the keyhole limpets and slit limpets.
