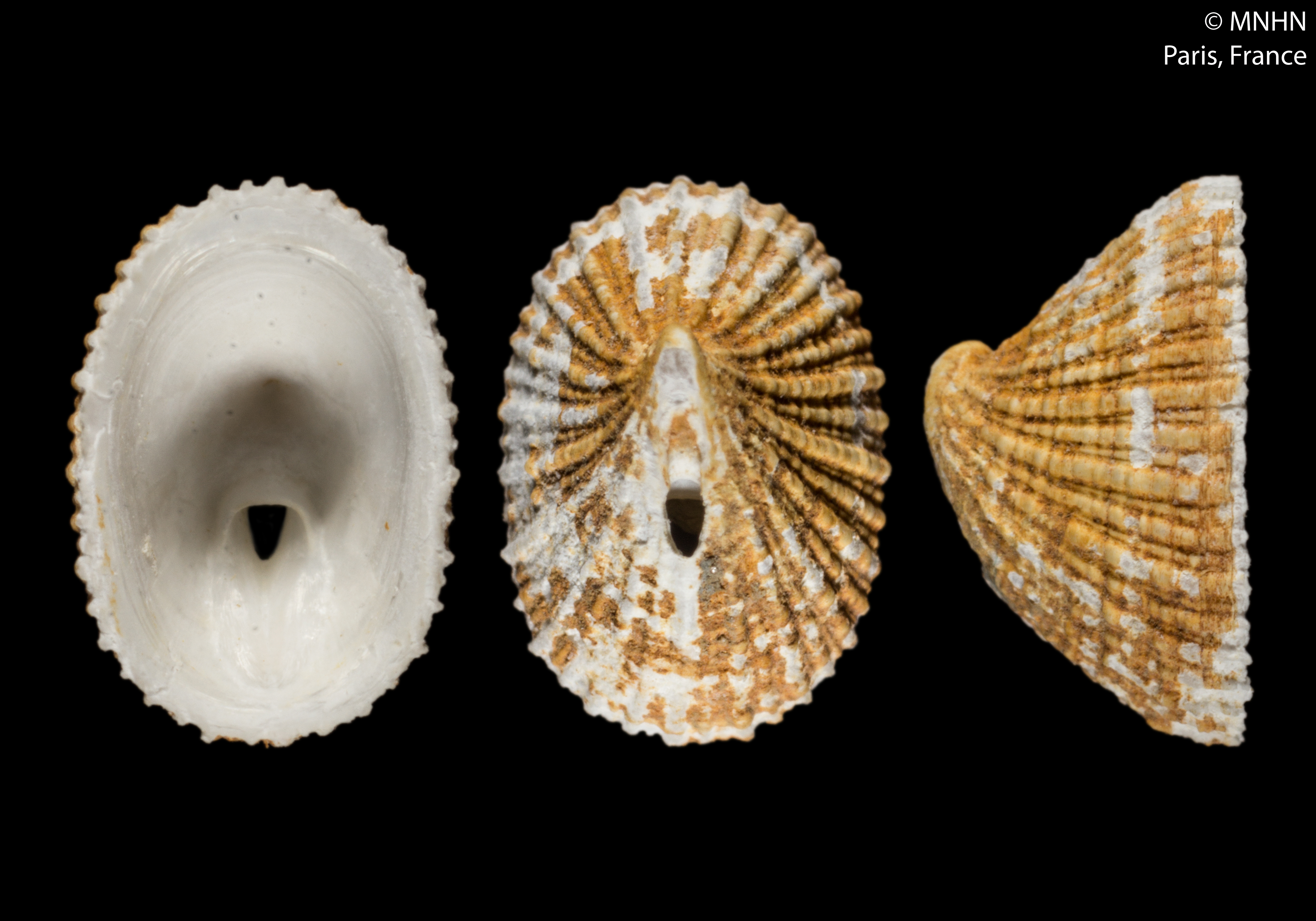
- Shell of Puncturella similis (holotype at MNHN, Paris)

Scientific classification
- Kingdom: Animalia
- Phylum: Mollusca
- Class: Gastropoda
- Subclass: Vetigastropoda
- Order: Lepetellida
- Family: Fissurellidae
- Genus: Puncturella
- Species: P. similis

Binomial name
- Puncturella similis Warén & Bouchet, 2009

= Puncturella similis =

Species of gastropod

Puncturella similis is a species of sea snail, a marine gastropod mollusk in the family Fissurellidae, the keyhole limpets.

== Description ==
The length of the shell attains 5.9 mm.

== Distribution ==
This species occurs at methane seeps in deep water off and in the Congo River, These marine gastropod mollusks inhabit the deep benthic zones in that region.
