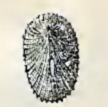
- Drawing with an apical view of a shell of Rimula exquisita

Scientific classification
- Kingdom: Animalia
- Phylum: Mollusca
- Class: Gastropoda
- Subclass: Vetigastropoda
- Order: Lepetellida
- Family: Fissurellidae
- Subfamily: Zeidorinae
- Genus: Puncturella
- Species: P. exquisita

Binomial name
- Puncturella exquisita Adams, 1853

Synonyms
- Cranopsis exquisita (A. Adams, 1853); Rimula exquisita A. Adams, 1853 (original combination)

= Puncturella exquisita =

Species of snail

Puncturella exquisita is a species of sea snail, a marine gastropod mollusk in the family Fissurellidae, the keyhole limpets.

== Description ==
The size of the shell varies between 5 mm and 12 mm.

== Distribution ==
This species occurs in the Red Sea and the Indian Ocean; also off the Philippines.
