= Puncturella expansa =

Scientific classification
- Kingdom: Animalia
- Phylum: Mollusca
- Class: Gastropoda
- Subclass: Vetigastropoda
- Order: Lepetellida
- Family: Fissurellidae
- Subfamily: Zeidorinae
- Genus: Puncturella
- Species: P. expansa

Binomial name
- Puncturella expansa (Dall, 1896)

Synonyms
- Cranopsis expansa (Dall, 1896); Rimula expansa Dall, 1896 (original combination)

Species of gastropod

Puncturella expansa, common name the broad puncturella, is a species of sea snail, a marine gastropod mollusk in the family Fissurellidae, the keyhole limpets and slit limpets.

== Description ==
The size of the shell varies between 25 mm and 40 mm.

== Distribution ==
This species occurs in the Pacific Ocean from Baja California, Mexico to Panama; off the Galápagos Islands.
