= Puncturella pseudanaloga =

Scientific classification
- Kingdom: Animalia
- Phylum: Mollusca
- Class: Gastropoda
- Subclass: Vetigastropoda
- Order: Lepetellida
- Family: Fissurellidae
- Genus: Puncturella
- Species: P. pseudanaloga

Binomial name
- Puncturella pseudanaloga Powell, 1957

Species of gastropod

Puncturella pseudanaloga is a minute species of deepwater keyhole limpet, a marine gastropod mollusc or micromollusk in the family Fissurellidae, the keyhole limpets and slit limpets.

== Distribution ==
This species is endemic to Australia's Macquarie Island.

== Habitat ==
This keyhole limpet is found at depths of about 70 m.
