= Puncturella cumingii =

Scientific classification
- Kingdom: Animalia
- Phylum: Mollusca
- Class: Gastropoda
- Subclass: Vetigastropoda
- Order: Lepetellida
- Family: Fissurellidae
- Subfamily: Zeidorinae
- Genus: Puncturella
- Species: P. cumingii

Binomial name
- Puncturella cumingii (Adams, 1853)

Synonyms
- Cranopsis cumingii (A. Adams, 1853); Rimula cumingii A. Adams, 1853 (original combination)

Species of gastropod

Puncturella cumingii is a species of sea snail, a marine gastropod mollusk in the family Fissurellidae, the keyhole limpets and slit limpets.
