= Puncturella major =

Scientific classification
- Kingdom: Animalia
- Phylum: Mollusca
- Class: Gastropoda
- Subclass: Vetigastropoda
- Order: Lepetellida
- Family: Fissurellidae
- Subfamily: Zeidorinae
- Genus: Puncturella
- Species: P. major

Binomial name
- Puncturella major (Dall, 1891)

Synonyms
- Cranopsis major Dall, 1891

Species of gastropod

Puncturella major, common name the large puncturella, is a species of sea snail, a marine gastropod mollusk in the family Fissurellidae, the keyhole limpets and slit limpets.

== Distribution ==
This marine species occurs in the Indo-Pacific and in the Bering Sea
