= Puncturella brychia =

Scientific classification
- Kingdom: Animalia
- Phylum: Mollusca
- Class: Gastropoda
- Subclass: Vetigastropoda
- Order: Lepetellida
- Family: Fissurellidae
- Genus: Puncturella
- Species: P. brychia

Binomial name
- Puncturella brychia Watson, 1883

Species of gastropod

Puncturella brychia is a species of sea snail, a marine gastropod mollusk in the family Fissurellidae, the keyhole limpets.

== Description ==
Puncturella brychia are sea floor predators found in the North Atlantic, especially near Nova Scotia, that feed on both mobile and sessile prey. They use mucus to glide across the bottom of the ocean as their primary mode of mobility. The species reproduces sexually.
