= Puncturella billsae =

Scientific classification
- Kingdom: Animalia
- Phylum: Mollusca
- Class: Gastropoda
- Subclass: Vetigastropoda
- Order: Lepetellida
- Family: Fissurellidae
- Genus: Puncturella
- Species: P. billsae

Binomial name
- Puncturella billsae Pérez Farfante, 1947

Synonyms
- Cranopsis billsae (Pérez Farfante, 1947); Puncturella (Cranopsis) billsae Pérez Farfante, 1947 (original combination)

Species of gastropod

Puncturella billsae is a species of sea snail, a marine gastropod mollusk in the family Fissurellidae, the keyhole limpets.

== Description ==
The size of the shell reaches 3.5 mm.

== Distribution ==
This species occurs in the Gulf of Mexico, in the Caribbean Sea (off Cuba) and in the Atlantic Ocean off Brazil.
