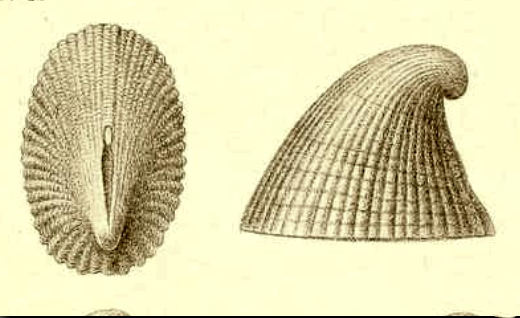
- Drawing of a shell of Puncturella spirigera (holotype)

Scientific classification
- Kingdom: Animalia
- Phylum: Mollusca
- Class: Gastropoda
- Subclass: Vetigastropoda
- Order: Lepetellida
- Family: Fissurellidae
- Genus: Puncturella
- Species: P. spirigera

Binomial name
- Puncturella spirigera Thiele, 1912

= Puncturella spirigera =

Species of gastropod

Puncturella spirigera is a species of sea snail, a marine gastropod mollusk in the family Fissurellidae, the keyhole limpets.

== Taxonomy ==
Arnaud (1972) placed this species in synonymy of the widespread Puncturella conica (d'Orbigny, 1841) but this was rebutted by Dell (1990: 76).

== Distribution ==
This species occurs in the Davis Sea.
