= Puncturella multistriata =

Scientific classification
- Kingdom: Animalia
- Phylum: Mollusca
- Class: Gastropoda
- Subclass: Vetigastropoda
- Order: Lepetellida
- Family: Fissurellidae
- Subfamily: Zeidorinae
- Genus: Puncturella
- Species: P. multistriata

Binomial name
- Puncturella multistriata Dall, 1914

Synonyms
- Cranopsis multistriata (Dall, 1914)

Species of gastropod

Puncturella multistriata or the many-ribbed puncturella is a species of sea snail, a marine gastropod mollusk in the family Fissurellidae, the keyhole limpets and slit limpets.

== Description ==
The size of the shell reaches 35 mm (1.4 in).

== Distribution ==
This species occurs in the Pacific Ocean from the Aleutians to California, USA.
