= Puncturella pelex =

- Drawing of a shell of Puncturella pelex

Scientific classification
- Kingdom: Animalia
- Phylum: Mollusca
- Class: Gastropoda
- Subclass: Vetigastropoda
- Order: Lepetellida
- Family: Fissurellidae
- Subfamily: Zeidorinae
- Genus: Puncturella
- Species: P. pelex

Binomial name
- Puncturella pelex Adams, 1860

Synonyms
- Cranopsis pelex A. Adams, 1860 (original combination); Rimula (Cranopsis) pelex (A. Adams 1860)

Species of gastropod

Puncturella pelex is a species of sea snail, a marine gastropod mollusk in the family Fissurellidae, the keyhole limpets and slit limpets.

The epithet uses the Greek word for "helmet".

== Description ==
The length of the shell attains 6 mm.

== Distribution ==
This marine species occurs off Japan and in the East China Sea.
