= Profundisepta sportella =

Scientific classification
- Kingdom: Animalia
- Phylum: Mollusca
- Class: Gastropoda
- Subclass: Vetigastropoda
- Order: Lepetellida
- Family: Fissurellidae
- Genus: Profundisepta
- Species: P. sportella

Binomial name
- Profundisepta sportella (Watson, 1883)

Species of gastropod

Profundisepta sportella is a species of sea snail, a marine gastropod mollusk in the family Fissurellidae, the keyhole limpets.
