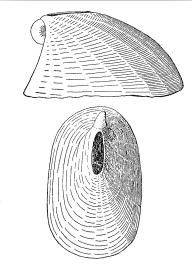
- Shell of Vacerrena kesteveni (holotype)

Scientific classification
- Kingdom: Animalia
- Phylum: Mollusca
- Class: Gastropoda
- Subclass: Vetigastropoda
- Order: Lepetellida
- Family: Fissurellidae
- Subfamily: Emarginulinae
- Genus: Vacerrena
- Species: V. kesteveni

Binomial name
- Vacerrena kesteveni (Hedley, 1900)

Synonyms
- Puncturella demissa Hedley, 1904; Puncturella kesteveni Hedley, 1900 (original combination); Vacerra demissa (Hedley, 1904); Vacerra demissa menda Iredale, 1924

= Vacerrena kesteveni =

Species of gastropod

Vacerrena kesteveni is a species of sea snail, a marine gastropod mollusk in the family Fissurellidae, the keyhole limpets and slit limpets.

== Description ==
The length of the shell attains 1.8 mm, the height l mm, the breadth 1.2 mm.

(Original description) The small shell is thin, but opaque. It is low arched, summit posterior, within the margin. The anterior slope is gently arched. The posterior is steep and straight. The protoconch is persistent, set obliquely, exposing part of two spiral whorls. The colour of the shell is white. The sculpture shows fine incremental threads, scarcely undulated by obsolete radial ribs. The aperture is oblong and rather broader in front. The slit on the summit is linear-lanceolate, more than three times longer than broad. The septum is drawn down to a third of the length of the shell, completely screening the interior from the slit, thickened at the margin.

The comparative smoothness, persistent apex, narrow fissure and long septum, sufficiently characterise this minute species, which is the first of the genus to be recorded from New Zealand.

== Distribution ==
This marine species is endemic to New Zealand.
