= Puncturella erecta =

Scientific classification
- Kingdom: Animalia
- Phylum: Mollusca
- Class: Gastropoda
- Subclass: Vetigastropoda
- Order: Lepetellida
- Family: Fissurellidae
- Genus: Puncturella
- Species: P. erecta

Binomial name
- Puncturella erecta Dall, 1889

Synonyms
- Cranopsis erecta (Dall, 1889); Puncturella (Cranopsis) erecta Dall, 1889 (basionym); Puncturella hendersoni Dall, 1927

Species of gastropod

Puncturella erecta is a species of sea snail, a marine gastropod mollusk in the family Fissurellidae, the keyhole limpets.

== Description ==
The size of the shell reaches 15 mm.

== Distribution ==
This species occurs in the Gulf of Mexico.
