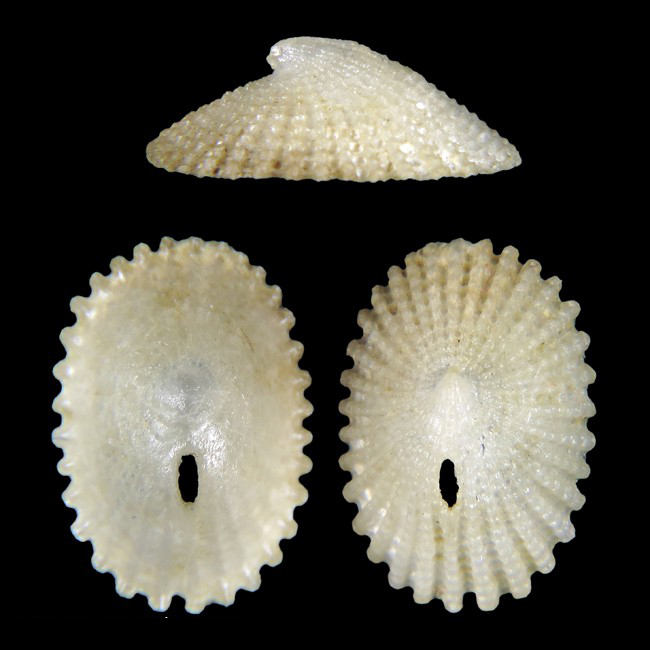
- Shell of Puncturella floris

Scientific classification
- Kingdom: Animalia
- Phylum: Mollusca
- Class: Gastropoda
- Subclass: Vetigastropoda
- Order: Lepetellida
- Family: Fissurellidae
- Genus: Puncturella
- Species: P. floris

Binomial name
- Puncturella floris (Poppe, Tagaro & Stahlschmidt, 2015)

Synonyms
- Cranopsis floris Poppe, Tagaro & Stahlschmidt, 2015 (original combination)

= Puncturella floris =

Species of gastropod

Puncturella floris is a species of sea snail, a marine gastropoda mollusk in the family Fissurellidae.

== Original description ==
- Poppe G.T., Tagaro S.P. & Stahlschmidt P. (2015). New shelled molluscan species from the central Philippines I. Visaya. 4(3): 15–59. page(s): 16, pl. 2 figs 1–2.
