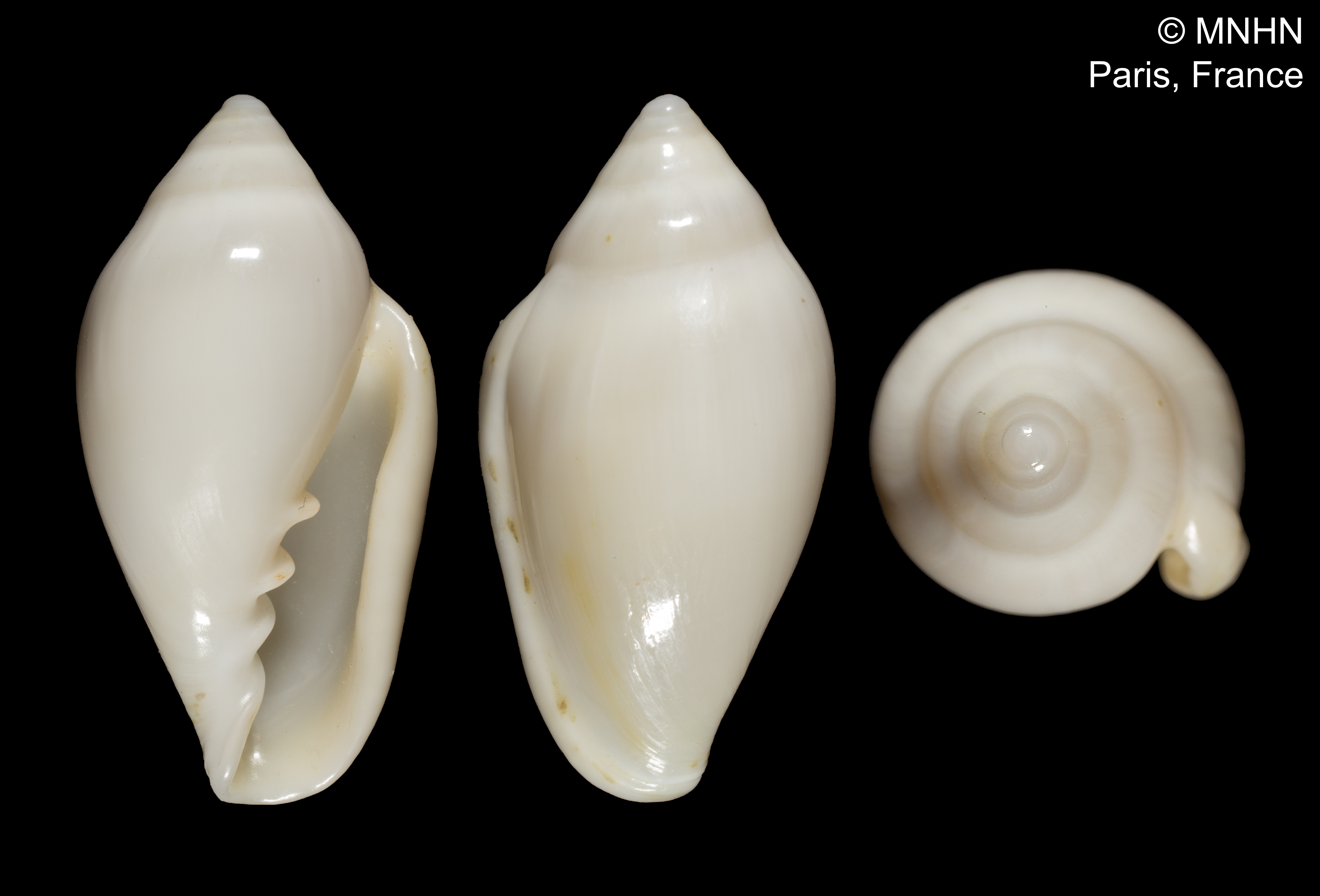
- Shell of Marginella aronnax (holotype at MNHN, Paris)

Scientific classification
- Kingdom: Animalia
- Phylum: Mollusca
- Class: Gastropoda
- Subclass: Caenogastropoda
- Order: Neogastropoda
- Family: Marginellidae
- Subfamily: Marginellinae
- Genus: Marginella
- Species: M. aronnax

Binomial name
- Marginella aronnax Bouchet & Warén, 1985

Synonyms
- Dentimargo aronnax (Bouchet & Warén, 1985); Marginella (Afriamarginella) aronnax Bouchet & Warén, 1985· accepted, alternate representation; Marginella impudica var. curta Locard, 1897; Marginella impudica var. marginata Locard, 1897; Marginella impudica var. minor Locard, 1897

= Marginella aronnax =

Species of gastropod

Marginella aronnax is a species of sea snail, a marine gastropod mollusk in the family Marginellidae, the margin snails.

== Distribution ==
This species occurs in the Atlantic Ocean off the Sahara.
