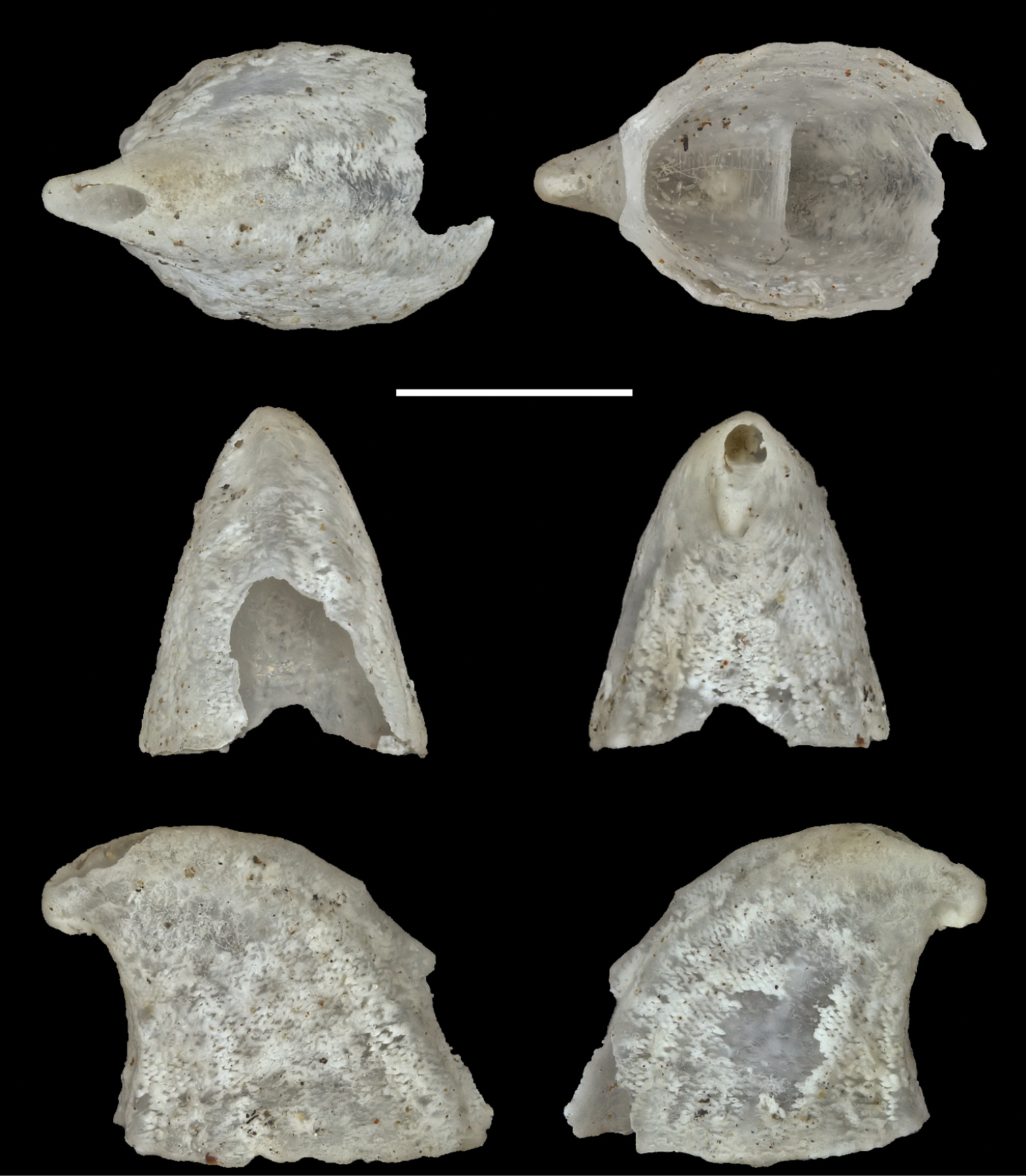

Scientific classification
- Kingdom: Animalia
- Phylum: Mollusca
- Class: Gastropoda
- Subclass: Vetigastropoda
- Order: Lepetellida
- Family: Fissurellidae
- Subfamily: Emarginulinae
- Genus: Vacerrena
- Species: V. nana

Binomial name
- Vacerrena nana (H. Adams, 1872)

Synonyms
- Cemoria nana Adams, 1872 (original combination); Fissurisepta joschristiaensis Drivas & Jay, 1985; Puncturella (Vacerrena) christiaensi Kilburn, 1978; Puncturella christiaensi Kilburn, 1978; Puncturella nana (H. Adams, 1872)

= Vacerrena nana =

Species of gastropod

Vacerrena nana is a species of sea snail, a marine gastropod mollusk in the family Fissurellidae, the keyhole limpets and slit limpets.

== Description ==
The length of the shell attains 2 mm, the width 1¼ mm, the height 2 mm.

The rather solid shel is elevated-conic. It is sculptured with 15 radiating ribs, the front ones wider apart. The apex is acute and strongly recurved. The aperture is oval.

== Distribution ==
This marine species occurs in the Red Sea.
