= Puncturella granulata =

Scientific classification
- Kingdom: Animalia
- Phylum: Mollusca
- Class: Gastropoda
- Subclass: Vetigastropoda
- Order: Lepetellida
- Family: Fissurellidae
- Genus: Puncturella
- Species: P. granulata

Binomial name
- Puncturella granulata (Seguenza, 1862)

Synonyms
- Cranopsis granulata Seguenza, 1862 (original combination); Puncturella (Cranopsis) granulata (Seguenza, 1863); Puncturella tuberculata R. B. Watson, 1883 (unavailable name: introduced in synonymy and never used as valid); Puncturella watsoni Dall, 1889; Rimula granulata Seguenza, 1862

Species of gastropod

Puncturella granulata is a species of sea snail, a marine gastropod mollusk in the family Fissurellidae, the keyhole limpets.

== Description ==
The size of the shell varies between 2.5 mm and 8 mm.

== Distribution ==
This marine species occurs in the Caribbean Sea and from the Florida Keys, USA to the Antilles and Brazil.
