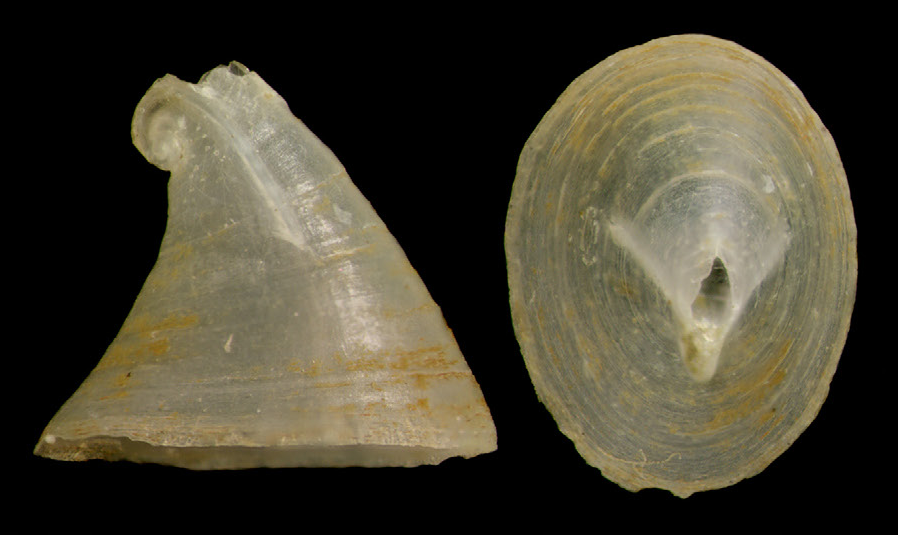

Scientific classification
- Kingdom: Animalia
- Phylum: Mollusca
- Class: Gastropoda
- Subclass: Vetigastropoda
- Order: Lepetellida
- Family: Fissurellidae
- Genus: Profundisepta
- Species: P. alicei

Binomial name
- Profundisepta alicei (Dautzenberg & H. Fischer, 1897)

Synonyms
- Puncturella alicei Dautzenberg & H. Fischer, 1897

= Profundisepta alicei =

Species of gastropod

Profundisepta alicei is a species of sea snail, a marine gastropod mollusk in the family Fissurellidae, the keyhole limpets.
