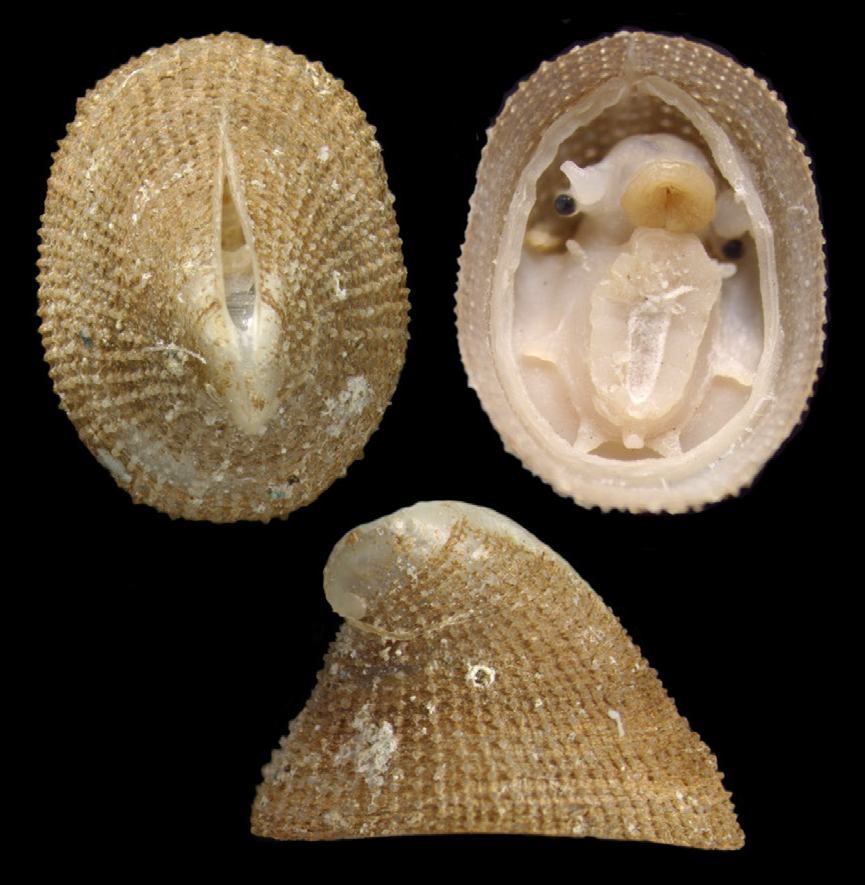

Scientific classification
- Kingdom: Animalia
- Phylum: Mollusca
- Class: Gastropoda
- Subclass: Vetigastropoda
- Order: Lepetellida
- Family: Fissurellidae
- Genus: Puncturella
- Species: P. agger

Binomial name
- Puncturella agger Watson, 1883

Synonyms
- Cranopsis agger (Watson, 1883)

= Puncturella agger =

Species of gastropod

Puncturella agger is a species of sea snail, a marine gastropod mollusk in the family Fissurellidae, the keyhole limpets.

== Description ==
The length of the shell attains 6 mm.

The species belongs to a Benthos functional group. It is a predator, feeding on both mobile and sessile prey.

== Distribution ==
This species occurs in the Gulf of Mexico and off Puerto Rico at depths between 249 m and 1,966 m.
