= Rimulanax aethiopica =

Scientific classification
- Kingdom: Animalia
- Phylum: Mollusca
- Class: Gastropoda
- Subclass: Vetigastropoda
- Order: Lepetellida
- Family: Fissurellidae
- Subfamily: Emarginulinae
- Genus: Rimulanax
- Species: R. aethiopica

Binomial name
- Rimulanax aethiopica (Martens, 1902)

Synonyms
- Cranopsis aethiopica (Martens, 1902); Puncturella (Cranopsis) aethiopica Martens, 1902; Puncturella (Rimulanax) aethiopica Martens, 1902; Puncturella aethiopica E. von Martens, 1902 (original combination)

Species of gastropod

Rimulanax aethiopica is a species of sea snail, a marine gastropod mollusk in the family Fissurellidae, the keyhole limpets and slit limpets.
