= Isabel Pérez Farfante =

Cuban-born carcinologist (1916–2009)

Isabel C. Pérez Farfante
- Born: July 24, 1916; Havana, Cuba
- Died: August 20, 2009 (aged 93); Florida
- Occupation: Carcinologist

Isabel Pérez Farfante (July 24, 1916 – August 20, 2009) was a Cuban-born carcinologist. She was the first Cuban woman to receive her Ph.D. from an Ivy League school. She returned to Cuba from the United States only to be blacklisted by Fidel Castro's government. She and her family escaped Cuba, and she became one of the world's foremost zoologists studying prawns. She discovered large populations of shrimp off the coast of Cuba and published one of the most noted books on shrimps: "Penaeoid and Sergestoid Shrimps and Prawns of the World. Keys and Diagnoses for the Families and Genera."

== Early life and education ==
Farfante was born July 24, 1916, in Havana, Cuba. Her parents had moved from Spain to Cuba. When she was a teenager, her parents sent her to Asturias, Spain to attend high school. Farfante went on to attend the Complutense University of Madrid, only to be sent back to Cuba, since her family were Republicans, during the Spanish Civil War. Upon her return to Cuba, she finished her Bachelor of Science in 1938 from the University of Havana. After graduation she worked as an associate professor at the university. She married economist and geographer, Gerardo Canet Álvarez in 1941.

Farfante was awarded a Guggenheim Fellowship in 1942 for biology and ecology. This award, along with an Alexander Agassiz Fellowship in oceanography and zoology, and a fellowship at the Woods Hole Oceanographic Institution, helped support her attendance at Radcliffe College. She received her master's in biology in 1944. This made her one of the first women to attend Harvard University. She then went on to get her Ph.D. from Radcliffe.

== Career ==
While at Radcliffe, Farfante met Thomas Barbour in Washington, D.C. Farfante was struggling to garner support for her projects in her department, and Barbour advised she work at Harvard University. Barbour promised to help her obtain work there, and followed through, from 1946 until 1948 she was Associate Curator of the Museum of Comparative Zoology at Harvard. In 1948, she earned her Ph.D. from Radcliffe, making her the first Cuban woman to obtain her doctoral degree from an Ivy League school. Following graduation, she returned to Cuba.

Upon return to Cuba, Farfante served as full professor at the University of Havana until 1960. She also served as a shrimp researcher and then the director of the Cuban Fisheries Research Center until 1960, while still serving as professor. During this time, Pérez Farfante and husband Gerardo Canet supported the change of government with Fidel Castro. Pérez Farfante began having conflicts with the newly appointed co-director of the Research Center. Around that time, it was requested that Canet accompany Che Guevara on trips abroad. Canet declined, wanting to be close to his wife and two sons. This led to the couple's inclusion on the Cuban government's blacklist. They sent their sons to the United States and a month later the two fled Cuba, leaving behind all their personal items, except one suitcase.

Farfante and her family returned to Cambridge, Massachusetts, where she began working at the Museum of Comparative Zoology, serving as an associate in invertebrate zoology from 1961 until 1969. She did independent research, receiving funding from Radcliffe College and the National Science Foundation. She started working as systematic zoologist at the National Marine Fisheries Service lab at the National Museum of Natural History (NMNH) in Washington, D.C.

In 1986, she became Carcinologist Emeritus at the Fisheries Service, before leaving in 1990. She had become a research associate at NMNH, working in the Division of Crustacea. She retired in 1997, moving to Key Biscayne, Florida. Farfante continued participating in the field by assisting with collections at the Rosenstiel School of Marine, Atmospheric, and Earth Science at the University of Miami.

== Research ==
Pérez Farfante researched the systematics of penaeid shrimp. However, in the late 1930s and early 1940s, she studied foraminiferans and mollusks. For the latter, she studied under Carlos de la Torre Huerta, helping him with his later work. In the 1940s, while working at the Museum for Comparative Zoology, Pérez Farfante worked with Henry Bryant Bigelow on his research about lancelets. By 1950 she had started focusing on commercial shrimp. She discovered large shrimp populations in the Gulf of Batabanó and Isla de la Juventud.

After escaping to the United States, she focused on the systematics of penaeid shrimp, focusing on reproductive morphology. She researched shrimp from shrimp farms in America on behalf of the United States Fish and Wildlife Service from 1961 until 1962. While at the National Museum of Natural History she completed her "masterpiece," "Penaeoid and Sergestoid Shrimps and Prawns of the World. Keys and Diagnoses for the Families and Genera," alongside Brian Kensley and illustrator Molly Kelly Bryan.

In her later years, while assisting at the Rosenstiel School of Marine, Atmospheric, and Earth Science, she co-authored a paper about Sergestoidea and Penaeidae shrimp in the Tongue of the Ocean.

== Death ==
She died in Florida, on August 20, 2009, at age 93.

== Publications ==
- Isabel Pérez Farfante & Brian Kensley (1997). Penaeoid and Sergestoid Shrimps and Prawns of the World: Keys and Diagnoses for the Families and Genera. Washington, D.C.: National Museum of Natural History. ISBN 2-85653-510-0.
