= Paul Henri Fischer =

French physician, zoologist and paleontologist

- Born: 7 July 1835; Paris
- Died: 29 November 1893 (aged 58)
- Children: French zoologist Pierre Marie Henri Fischer (1865-1916)
- Scientific career
- Fields: Zoology
- Institutions: National Museum of Natural History (France)

Paul Henri Fischer (also spelled Paul-Henri Fischer), (7 July 1835 Paris – 29 November 1893) was a French physician, zoologist and paleontologist. He is generally known as Paul Fischer.

== Biography ==
He studied science and medicine, securing doctorates in both, and became assistant in paleontology at the National Museum of Natural History in Paris. He was made assistant naturalist there in 1872. Beginning in 1856, he was joint editor, with A. C. Bernardi to start with, of the Journal de Conchyliologie. He served several terms as president of the Société Géologique de France and the Société Zoologique de France. In 1880, he was a member of the commission for submarine dredging.

== Bibliography ==
- Faune conchyliologique marine du departement de la Gironde et des côtes du sud-ouest de la France (1865; enlarged by a Supplément in 1875)
- Catalogue des nudibranches et céphalopodes des côtes océaniques de la France (1867-1875)
- Recherches sur les Actinies des côtes océaniques de France (1876)
- L.C. Kiener & Paul Fischer, Spécies général et iconographie des coquilles vivantes comprenant la collection du Muséum d'histoire naturelle de Paris : la collection Lamarck, celle du prince Masséna (appartenant maintenant a M.B. Delessert) et les découvertes récentes des voyageurs; Paris :J.B. Baillière,1873-80
- Une nouvelle classification des bivalves (1885)
- (in French) Fischer P., Œhlert D.P. & Woodward S. P. (1880-1887). Manuel de conchyliologie et de paléontologie conchyliologique ou histoire naturelle des mollusques vivants et fossiles suivi d'un appendice sur les brachiopodes. Avec 23 planches contenant 600 figures et 1138 gravures dans le texte. pp. I-XXIV, pp. 1–1369, Plates I-XXIII, 1 map. Paris.
- Paléontologie de l'ile de Rhodes (1887)
- “Études sur les mollusques terrestres et fluviatiles,” in Mission scientifique en Mexique et dans l'Amérique centrale (1893-1894)
