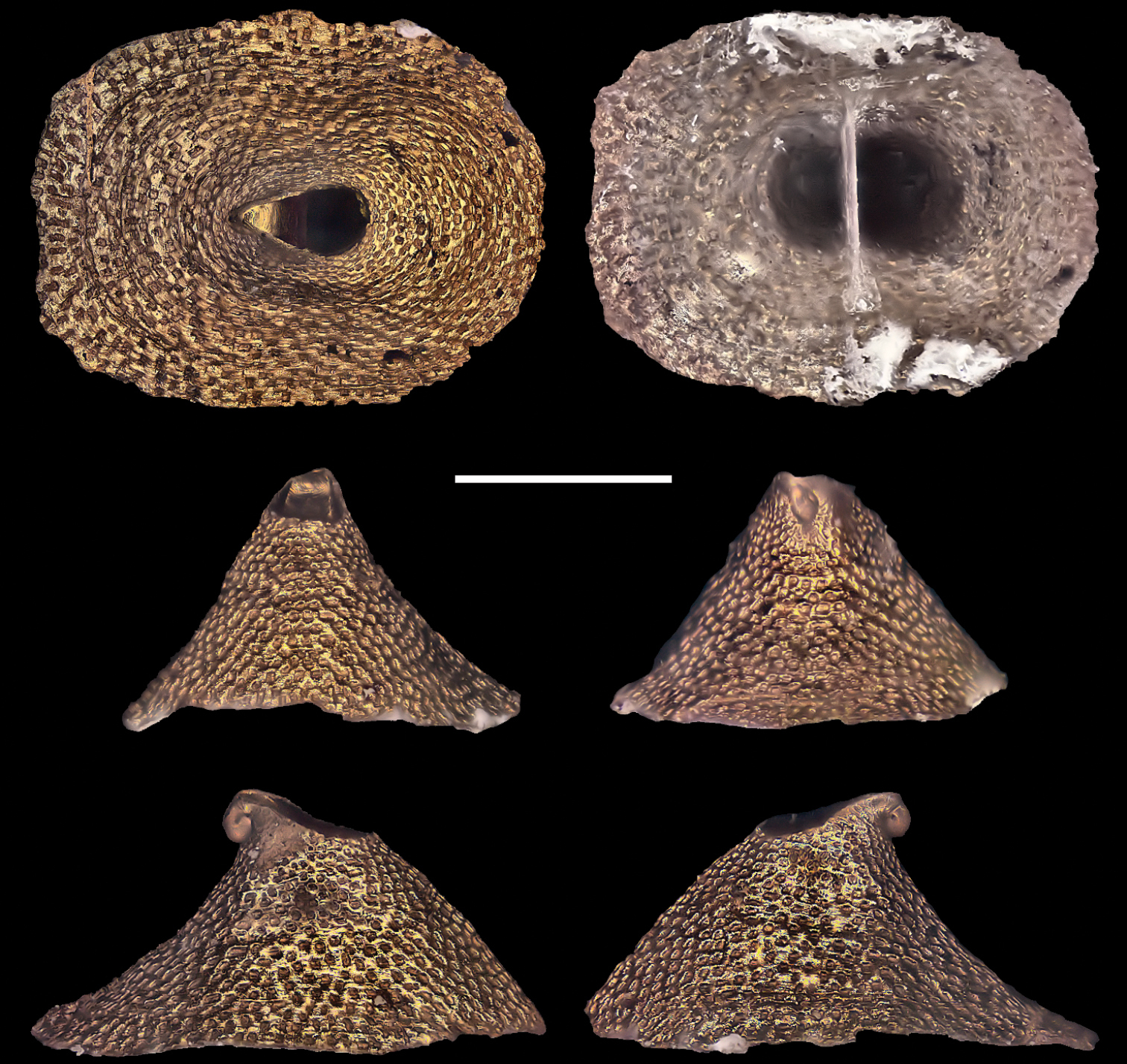
- Profundisepta voraginosa

Scientific classification
- Domain: Eukaryota
- Kingdom: Animalia
- Phylum: Mollusca
- Class: Gastropoda
- Subclass: Vetigastropoda
- Order: Lepetellida
- Superfamily: Fissurelloidea
- Family: Fissurellidae
- Subfamily: Zeidorinae; Naef, 1913

Synonyms
- Hemitominae Kuroda, Habe & Oyama, 1971; Zeidoridae Naef, 1913 (original rank)

= Zeidorinae =

Subfamily of limpet-like sea snails

The Zeidorinae, common name keyhole limpets and slit limpets, is a taxonomic subfamily of limpet-like sea snails, marine gastropod molluscs in the family Fissurellidae, the keyhole limpets and slit limpets.

== Genera ==
- Cornisepta McLean & Geiger, 1998
- Hemimarginula McLean, 2011
- Hemitoma Swainson, 1840
- Montfortia Récluz, 1843
- Montfortista Iredale, 1929
- Montfortulana Habe, 1961
- Octomarginula McLean, 2011
- Profundisepta McLean & Geiger, 1998
- Puncturella R. T. Lowe, 1827
- Zeidora A. Adams, 1860

Genera brought into synonymy

- Cemoria Risso, 1826: synonym of Puncturella R. T. Lowe, 1827
- Cranopsis A. Adams, 1860: synonym of Puncturella R. T. Lowe, 1827
- †Crepiemarginula Seguenza, 1880 : synonym of Zeidora A. Adams, 1860
- Legrandia C. E. Beddome, 1883: synonym of Zeidora A. Adams, 1860 (invalid: junior homonym of Legrandia Hanley, 1872)
- Nesta H. Adams, 1870: synonym of Zeidora A. Adams, 1860
- Sipho T. Brown, 1827: synonym of Puncturella R. T. Lowe, 1827
- Siphonella Issel, 1869: synonym of Montfortista Iredale, 1929 (Invalid: junior homonym of Siphonella Hagenow, 1851)
- Subemarginula Gray, 1847: synonym of Hemitoma Swainson, 1840
- Zidora P. Fischer, 1885: synonym of Zeidora A. Adams, 1860 (invalid: unjustified emendation of Zeidora A. Adams, 1860)
