= Ampelita clotho =

Scientific classification
- Kingdom: Animalia
- Phylum: Mollusca
- Class: Gastropoda
- Order: Stylommatophora
- Family: Acavidae
- Genus: Ampelita
- Species: A. clotho

Binomial name
- Ampelita clotho (Deshayes, 1850)

Synonyms
- Helix (Ampelita) clotho Deshayes, 1850 superseded combination; Helix clotho Deshayes, 1850 superseded combination

Species of gastropod

Ampelita clotho is a species of tropical air-breathing land snail, a terrestrial pulmonate gastropod mollusk in the family Acavidae.

== Description ==
The height of the shell attains 22–6 mm, its diameter 48 mm.

(Original description in French) This shell could be mistaken for a variety of Ampelita lachesis; however, it is distinguished by its much more depressed spire and by the angle of incidence of the aperture on the longitudinal axis. It is also of a larger size.

The shell is orbicular and sub-discoid. Its spire, very obtuse at the apex, is formed of five and a half whorls, of which the first, barely convex, are evidently angular at their circumference. The last two whorls are more convex, and the body whorl, very obscurely angular, is proportionally wider and more developed than those which precede it. This body whorl, convex below, is pierced at the base by a large umbilicus whose diameter is almost equal to half that of the body whorl.

The exterior surface is smooth, and some irregular ridges are noticeable towards the aperture. The latter is oval-oblong, transverse and wider than high. It is oblique, and its plane inclines at an angle of 40 degrees on the longitudinal axis. The two upper and lower portions of the outer lip are slightly curved and almost parallel. The upper extremity inclines obliquely towards the base and ends far below the circumference. The lower extremity detaches itself, forming a kind of auricle on the umbilicus by curving towards the upper extremity. These extremities remain separated in a space which is approximately equal to one third of the circumference of the penultimate whorl. A left edge, thick and projecting, extends in a straight line from one extremity to the other and completes the aperture. The right lip is thick, dilated and turned outwards. The shell's test is thick.

== Distribution ==
This species is endemic to Madagascar.
