= Ampelita lindae =

Scientific classification
- Kingdom: Animalia
- Phylum: Mollusca
- Class: Gastropoda
- Order: Stylommatophora
- Family: Acavidae
- Genus: Ampelita
- Species: A. lindae

Binomial name
- Ampelita lindae O. L. Griffiths & D. G. Herbert, 2013

Species of gastropod

Ampelita lindae is a species of tropical air-breathing land snail, a terrestrial pulmonate gastropod mollusk in the family Acavidae.

== Description ==
The height of the shell attains 12.6 mm, its diameter is 30.5 mm.

== Distribution ==
This species is endemic to Madagascar.
