= Ampelita owengriffithsi =

Scientific classification
- Kingdom: Animalia
- Phylum: Mollusca
- Class: Gastropoda
- Order: Stylommatophora
- Family: Acavidae
- Genus: Ampelita
- Species: A. owengriffithsi

Binomial name
- Ampelita owengriffithsi K. C. Emberton, Slapcinsky, C. A. Campbell, Rakotondrazafy, Andriamiarison & J. D. Emberton, 2010

Species of gastropod

Ampelita owengriffithsi is a species of tropical air-breathing land snail, a terrestrial pulmonate gastropod mollusk in the family Acavidae.

== Description ==
The height of the shell attains 25.5 mm, its diameter 54.7 mm.

The shell, contains 4.9 whorls. It features a keeled body whorl periphery. The spire is depressed and domed, with a rounded apex. The suture is moderately to rather shallowly impressed and broadly, shallowly channeled.

The aperture, measured parallel to the line connecting the upper and lower peristome insertions, is 7.02 mm in height (1.15 times the peristome insertion distance). Its width, perpendicular to this line, is 23.24 mm (0.42 times the shell diameter), resulting in an aperture height-to-width ratio of 0.30. The penultimate aperture protrudes 2.5 mm (0.11 times the aperture width) into the final aperture. The peristome is reflected throughout and moderately thick.

The umbilicus is broad, revealing all previous whorls, and measures 7.02 mm in width (0.13 times the shell diameter). The first whorl diameter is 2.39 mm, and the second whorl diameter is 7.25 mm, yielding an embryonic coiling tightness of 1.01 (2/ln second-whorl diameter). The embryonic whorl count is unclear. Embryonic sculpture consists of pustules arranged in irregular axial rows. Post-embryonic sculpture features irregular, discontinuous, axially-elongate ridges.

The shell's general color is brown, with a light brown band encircling the umbilicus.

== Distribution ==
This species is endemic to Madagascar.
