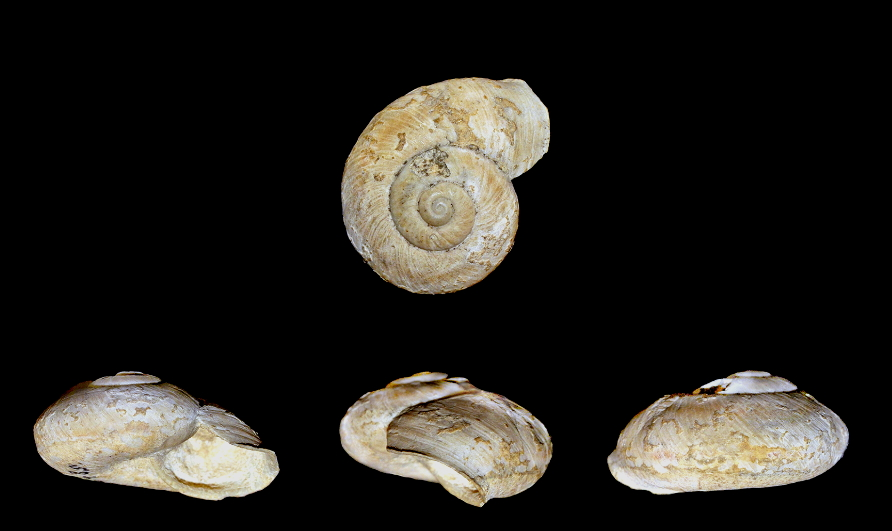
- Shell of Ampelita hova (specimen at MNHN, Paris)

Scientific classification
- Kingdom: Animalia
- Phylum: Mollusca
- Class: Gastropoda
- Order: Stylommatophora
- Family: Acavidae
- Genus: Ampelita
- Species: A. hova

Binomial name
- Ampelita hova (Angas, 1877)

Synonyms
- Helix (Ampelita) hova (Angas, 1877); Helix hova Angas, 1877 superseded combination; Helix madera Mabille, 1884 (uncertain > unassessed)

= Ampelita hova =

Species of gastropod

Ampelita hova is a species of tropical air-breathing land snail, a terrestrial pulmonate gastropod mollusk in the family Acavidae.

== Description ==
(Original description) This shell, wider than high, is quite solid. It exhibits closely spaced growth riblets and, under magnification, a very fine shagreen texture. Its coloration is yellowish-green with three broad brown spiral bands. It has four and a half moderately convex whorls. The upper surface of the body whorl displays a very slight spiral depression. The umbilical funnel is small. The umbilicus is slightly compressed and non-perspective. The aperture is oblique, oval-rectangular, and completely white inside, including the callus connecting its edges. The peristome is pure white, slightly dilated, and slightly reflected.

== Distribution ==
This species is endemic to Madagascar.
