= Ampelita galactostoma =

Scientific classification
- Kingdom: Animalia
- Phylum: Mollusca
- Class: Gastropoda
- Order: Stylommatophora
- Family: Acavidae
- Genus: Ampelita
- Species: A. galactostoma

Binomial name
- Ampelita galactostoma (L. Pfeiffer, 1849)

Synonyms
- Helix galactostoma L. Pfeiffer, 1849 (original combination); Helix (Ampelita) galactostoma Petit (pro parte)

Species of gastropod

Ampelita galactostoma is a species of tropical air-breathing land snail, a terrestrial pulmonate gastropod mollusk in the family Acavidae.

== Description ==
(Original description in Latin) This solid, convex-orbicular shell, tawny in color, exhibits oblique striations and a granular texture under magnification. It features an obtuse apex and four and a half slightly convex whorls. The penultimate whorl is keeled, and the body whorl descends towards the aperture. The base is separated from the moderately sized, perspective umbilicus by a subangular margin. The aperture is very oblique, oval, and white within. The simple peristome is brown-bordered, and the columellar edge is white and slightly dilated at the top.

== Distribution ==
This species is endemic to Madagascar.
