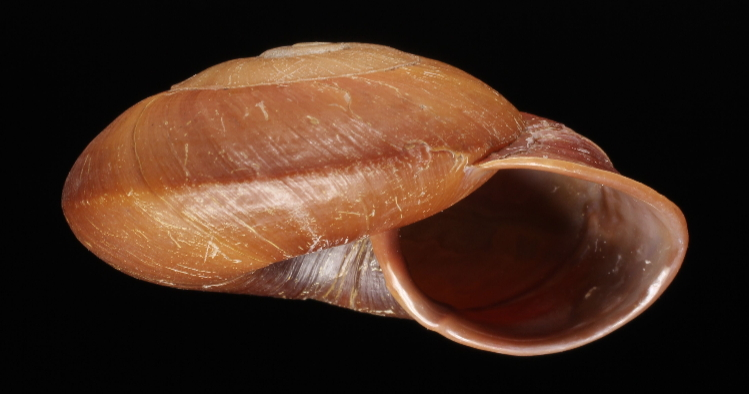
- Shell of Ampelita omphalodes var. loucoubeensis (specimen at MNHN, Paris)

Scientific classification
- Kingdom: Animalia
- Phylum: Mollusca
- Class: Gastropoda
- Order: Stylommatophora
- Family: Acavidae
- Genus: Ampelita
- Species: A. omphalodes

Binomial name
- Ampelita omphalodes (L. Pfeiffer, 1845)

Synonyms
- Helix omphalodes (L. Pfeiffer, 1845) (original combination)

= Ampelita omphalodes =

Species of gastropod

Ampelita omphalodes is a species of tropical air-breathing land snail, a terrestrial pulmonate gastropod mollusk in the family Acavidae.

Variety

- Ampelita omphalodes var. loucoubeensis (Crosse, 1881)

== Description ==
The height of the shell attains 16 mm, its diameter 41 mm.

(Original description in Latin) This widely umbilicate, depressed, and solid shell is lightly striated. Under a yellowish, deciduous epidermis. The shell is white, with reddish bands at the periphery and suture. The spire is barely raised, and the shell has five rather flat whorls. The body whorl barely descends anteriorly, and the base is slightly more convex, subcompressed around the large, spiral umbilicus, which is chestnut inside. The aperture is very oblique and lunate-oval. The peristome is shortly reflexed, brown, with converging margins.

== Distribution ==
This species is endemic to Madagascar.
