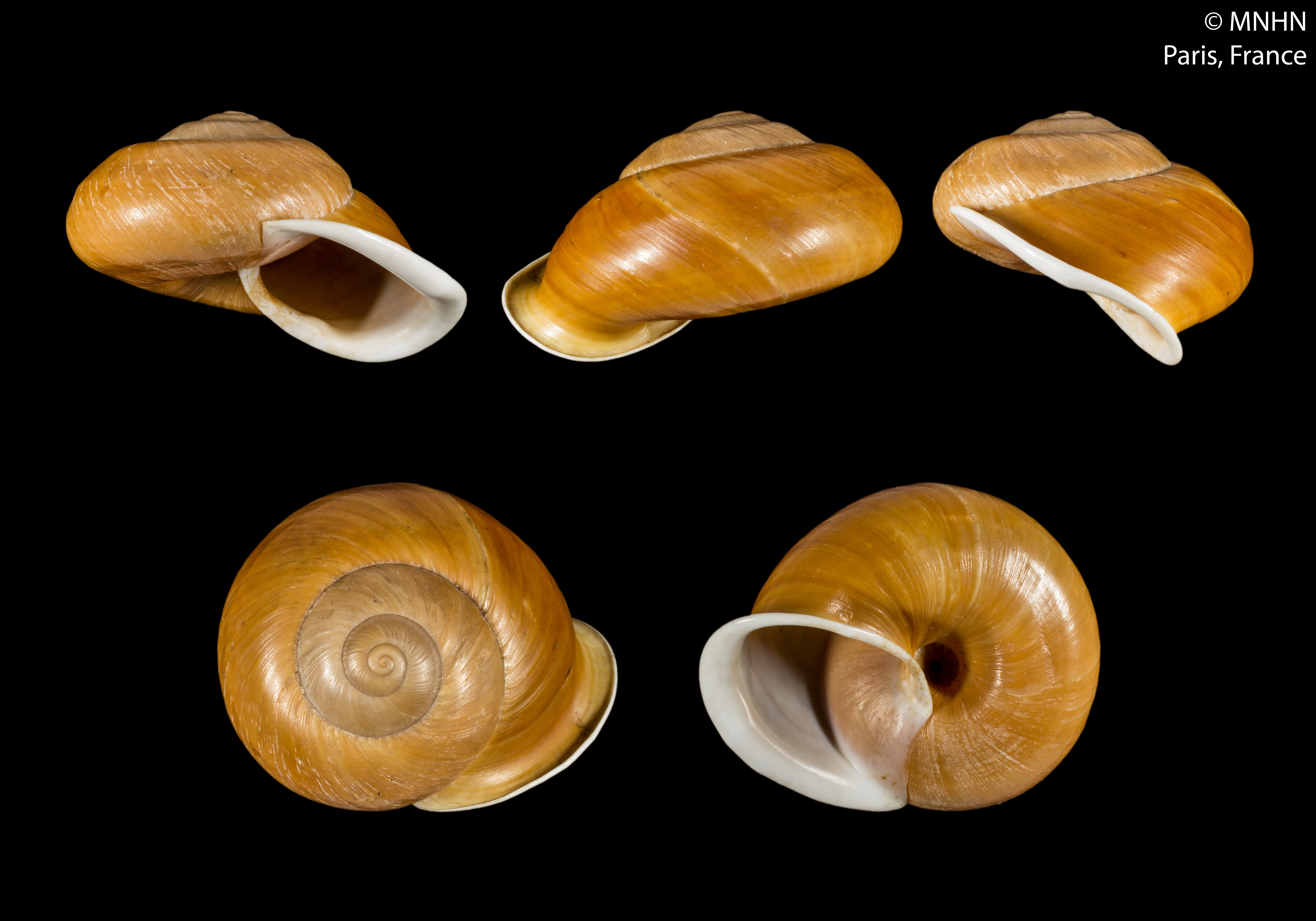
- Shell of Ampelita funebris (syntype at MNHN, Paris))

Scientific classification
- Domain: Eukaryota
- Kingdom: Animalia
- Phylum: Mollusca
- Class: Gastropoda
- Order: Stylommatophora
- Family: Acavidae
- Genus: Ampelita
- Species: A. funebris

Binomial name
- Ampelita funebris (Morelet, 1877)

Synonyms
- Helix funebris Morelet, 1877 superseded combination; Helix (Ampelita) funebris Petit (pro parte)

= Ampelita funebris =

Species of gastropod

Ampelita funebris is a species of tropical air-breathing land snail, a terrestrial pulmonate gastropod mollusk in the family Acavidae.

== Description ==
The height of the shell attains 26 mm, its diameter 53 mm.

(Original description in Latin) This widely umbilicated, orbicular-convex shell is quite solid, with faint growth striae and a finely granular texture visible under magnification. Uniformly colored, it is either purplish-black or dark beige. The slightly elevated spire consists of five whorls, separated by a distinct suture. The body whorl is flattened near the suture, then convex with a slight spiral depression. The clearly flattened base also exhibits a slight spiral depression. A funnel-shaped structure surrounds the umbilicus. The final half-whorl descends, with the descent intensifying near the large, oblique, oval aperture. The white peristome is widely reflected. The middle of the columellar edge has a slight bulge on its inner margin.

== Distribution ==
This species is endemic to Madagascar.
