= Ampelita lincolni =

Scientific classification
- Kingdom: Animalia
- Phylum: Mollusca
- Class: Gastropoda
- Order: Stylommatophora
- Family: Acavidae
- Genus: Ampelita
- Species: A. lincolni

Binomial name
- Ampelita lincolni K. C. Emberton & Rakotondrazafy, 2020

Species of gastropod

Ampelita lincolni is a species of tropical air-breathing land snail, a terrestrial pulmonate gastropod mollusk in the family Acavidae.

== Distribution ==
This species is endemic to Madagascar.
