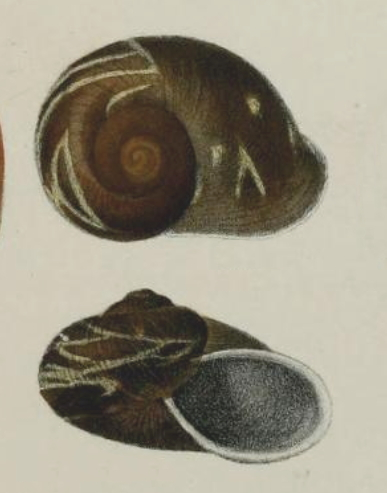
- Shell of Ampelita percyana (holotype)

Scientific classification
- Domain: Eukaryota
- Kingdom: Animalia
- Phylum: Mollusca
- Class: Gastropoda
- Order: Stylommatophora
- Family: Acavidae
- Genus: Ampelita
- Species: A. percyana

Binomial name
- Ampelita percyana (E. A. Smith, 1880)

Synonyms
- Helix (Ampelita) percyana E. A. Smith, 1880 (original combination)

= Ampelita percyana =

Species of gastropod

Ampelita percyana is a species of tropical air-breathing land snail, a terrestrial pulmonate gastropod mollusk in the family Acavidae.

== Description ==
The height of the shell attains 18 mm, its diameter 31 mm.

(Original description in Latin) The shell, characterized by its thinness and depressed-globose form, is moderately umbilicate. Its surface is minutely granulate in subserial rows and sculpted with very oblique growth lines. The shell's coloration is brownish-olive, sparsely marked with opaque milky-white flashes. It consists of four rapidly increasing, convex whorls. The body whorl is large, somewhat inflated, and descends anteriorly. The spire is slightly prominent, terminating in an obtuse apex. The aperture is large, transverse, and slightly oblique, positioned nearly subhorizontally, with a lilac interior. The peristome is white, shortly expanded, and reflexed. Its margins are approximate, and the columellar edge is oblique, rather straight, and barely arched.

== Distribution ==
This species is endemic to Madagascar.
