= Ampelita gaudens =

Scientific classification
- Kingdom: Animalia
- Phylum: Mollusca
- Class: Gastropoda
- Order: Stylommatophora
- Family: Acavidae
- Genus: Ampelita
- Species: A. gaudens

Binomial name
- Ampelita gaudens (Mabille, 1884)

Synonyms
- Helix (Ampelita) lanciformis O. Boettger, 1889 (junior synonym); Helix gaudens Mabille, 1884 (original combination)

Species of gastropod

Ampelita gaudens is a species of tropical air-breathing land snail, a terrestrial pulmonate gastropod mollusk in the family Acavidae.

Varieties

- Ampelita gaudens var. campbelliana (Pilsbry in Tryon, 1890)
- Ampelita gaudens var. gaudens (Mabille, 1884)
- Ampelita gaudens var. macrogranulosa Fischer-Piette, C. P. Blanc, F. Blanc & F. Salvat, 1994
- Ampelita gaudens var. nossibeensis O. Boettger, 1889

== Description ==
The height of the shell attains 27 mm, its diameter 63 mm.

(Original description in Latin) This brown shell features a wide, deep umbilicus that allows a view to the apex. Its shape is discoid-subdepressed, solid yet lightweight. The shell is very finely punctuated near the suture, while the remaining upper surface is malleated and irregularly striated. The apex is only slightly raised. Five and a quarter rapidly growing, convex whorls are separated by a distinct suture. The body whorl is very large, with a slightly fragmented keel along its equator. Near the aperture, the body whorl descends abruptly and significantly. The base exhibits a slight flat area around the umbilicus and small growth riblets covered in tiny granules. A yellowish band encircles the umbilicus. The aperture is very oblique, elongated, with nearly parallel upper and lower edges. Its interior is a pale grayish-blue. The peristome is shortly reflected. The columella is slightly dilated at the top but does not extend over the umbilicus.

== Distribution ==
This species is endemic to Madagascar.
