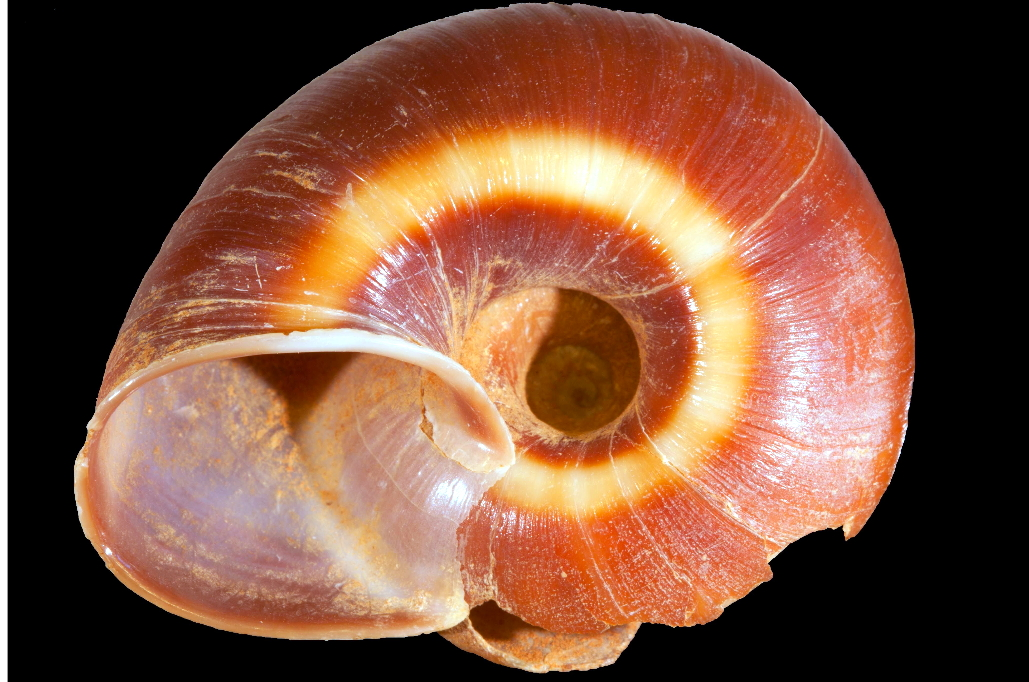
- Shell of Ampelita bizonalis (specimen at the Swedish Museum of Natural History)

Scientific classification
- Kingdom: Animalia
- Phylum: Mollusca
- Class: Gastropoda
- Order: Stylommatophora
- Family: Acavidae
- Genus: Ampelita
- Species: A. bizonalis

Binomial name
- Ampelita bizonalis Odhner, 1919

= Ampelita bizonalis =

Species of gastropod

Ampelita bizonalis is a species of tropical air-breathing land snail, a terrestrial pulmonate gastropod mollusk in the family Acavidae.

== Description ==
The height of the shell attains 17 mm, its diameter 36 mm.

(Original description in French) The shell is very depressed, with a wide, perspective umbilicus. Its somewhat shiny surface is sculpted with prominent, irregular growth lines and is microscopically rough. Five flattened whorls are separated by a fine suture. The body whorl is almost angular at the periphery, significantly widened, and descends abruptly towards the oval aperture. The upper lip is straight, sharp, and barely reflected; the outer lip and especially the lower lip are well reflected and sinuous as they approach the nearly straight columella. A thin layer of callus connects the lips across the inner wall.

The shell is dark brown towards the periphery, becoming a lighter yellowish-brown on the upper whorls. A whitish line marks the suture. A narrow tawny band appears at the body whorl's angle, and a wider band encircles the umbilicus, which is dark brown within. The lower part of the aperture is chocolate-colored with a white layer, the reflected lip white below, and the rest brownish.

== Distribution ==
This species is endemic to Madagascar.
