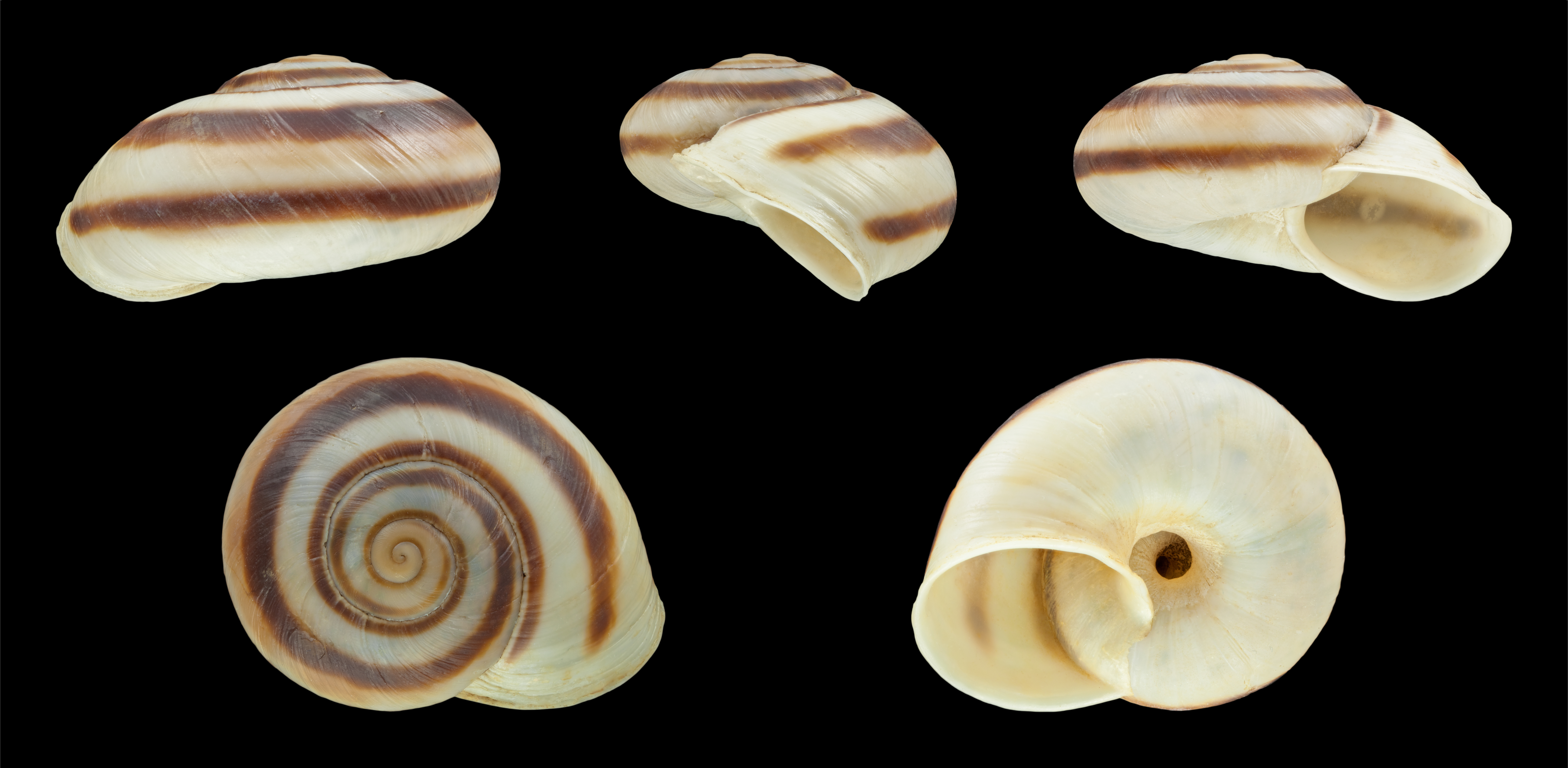
- Shell of Ampelita madecassina

Scientific classification
- Kingdom: Animalia
- Phylum: Mollusca
- Class: Gastropoda
- Order: Stylommatophora
- Family: Acavidae
- Genus: Ampelita
- Species: A. madecassina

Binomial name
- Ampelita madecassina (A. Férussac, 1822)

Synonyms
- Helix madecassina A. Férussac, 1822 (original combination)

= Ampelita madecassina =

Species of gastropod

Ampelita madecassina is a species of tropical air-breathing land snail, a terrestrial pulmonate gastropod mollusk in the family Acavidae.

== Distribution ==
This species is endemic to Madagascar.
