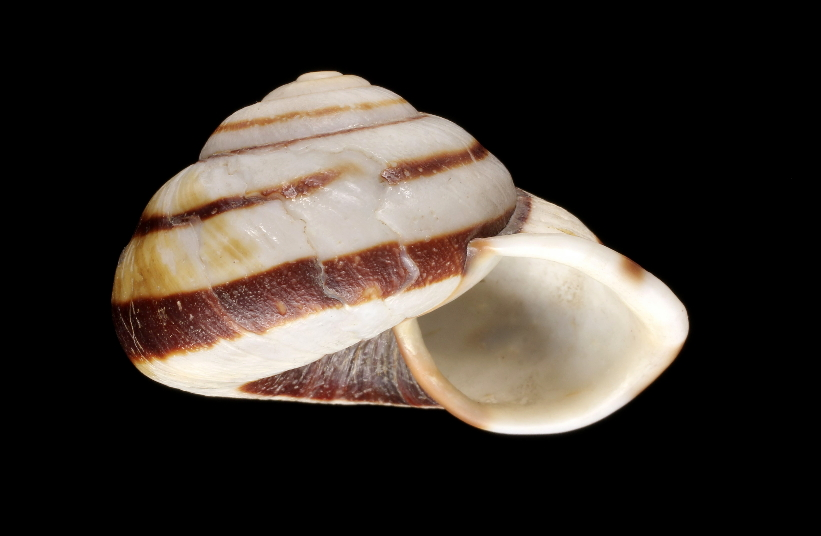
- Shell of Ampelita subsepulcralis (syntype at MNHN, Paris)

Scientific classification
- Kingdom: Animalia
- Phylum: Mollusca
- Class: Gastropoda
- Order: Stylommatophora
- Family: Acavidae
- Genus: Ampelita
- Species: A. subsepulcralis

Binomial name
- Ampelita subsepulcralis (Crosse, 1868)

Synonyms
- Ampelita subsepulcralis var. minor (Crosse & P. Fischer, 1890); Helix subsepulcralis Crosse, 1868 (original combination); Helix subsepulcralis var. minor Crosse & P. Fischer, 1890 (original combination)

= Ampelita subsepulcralis =

Species of gastropod

Ampelita subsepulcralis is a species of tropical air-breathing land snail, a terrestrial pulmonate gastropod mollusk in the family Acavidae.

Varieties

- Ampelita subsepulcralis var. nigropurpurea (Crosse & P. Fischer, 1890)
- Ampelita subsepulcralis var. obscura (Crosse, 1868)

== Description ==
The height of the shell attains 23 mm, its diameter 40.5 mm.

(Original description in Latin) The shell is characterized by its wide umbilicus and its subdepressed-turbinate form. The shell is solid and exhibits a somewhat smooth surface with very faint, suboblique, unequal striae. Under a very thin, highly deciduous, tawny epidermis, the shell reveals a white base, spirally zoned with blackish-chestnut. The spire is short, and the suture is impressed. The shell comprises five rather rapidly increasing, somewhat convex whorls. The body whorl descends and is deflected anteriorly. It is somewhat rounded, featuring a more flattened, slightly compressed base. It is encircled spirally by three blackish-chestnut zones: a smaller one located above, a wider one positioned slightly below the peripheral line, and a third that completely occupies the large, spiral umbilicus. The aperture is markedly oblique, elliptical-oval, and whitish internally. The peristome is widely reflexed, with its margins joined by a rather thick callus, chestnut-bordered at the termination points of the body whorl's zones, and its outer lip is dilated.

== Distribution ==
This species is endemic to Madagascar.
