= Ampelita stilpna =

Scientific classification
- Kingdom: Animalia
- Phylum: Mollusca
- Class: Gastropoda
- Order: Stylommatophora
- Family: Acavidae
- Genus: Ampelita
- Species: A. stilpna

Binomial name
- Ampelita stilpna (Mabille, 1884)

Synonyms
- Helix stilpna Mabille, 1884 (original combination)

Species of gastropod

Ampelita stilpna is a species of tropical air-breathing land snail, a terrestrial pulmonate gastropod mollusk in the family Acavidae.

== Description ==
The height of the shell attains 19 mm, its diameter 39 mm.

(Original description in French) This subglobular-depressed shell is umbilicate, solid, and rather thick, featuring coarse ribbed-striations and three reddish-brown bands. Two bands are on the upper surface, while the third encircles the umbilical region. The spire is very obtuse, mammillated, and only slightly raised, with a large apex. The whorls are convex, rapidly growing, and the body whorl is large and well-rounded at the periphery, lacking any angularity. The umbilicus is moderately sized, slightly flared, revealing the spiral coiling, and is weakly indented by the reflected columellar edge.

== Distribution ==
This species is endemic to Madagascar.
