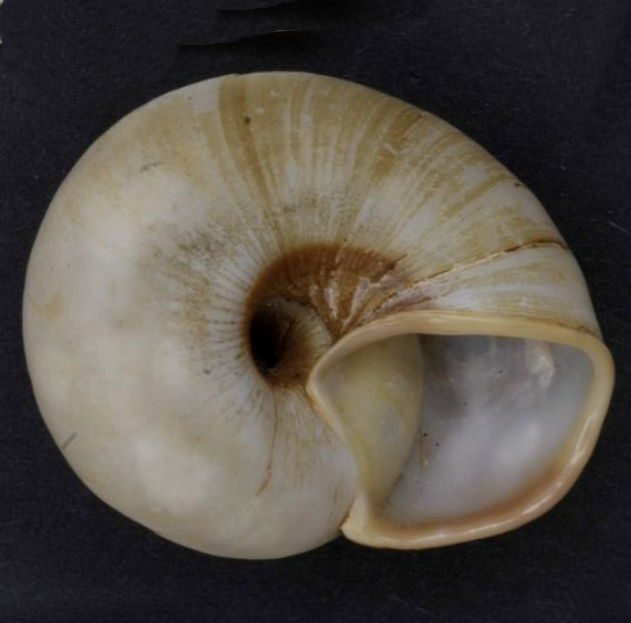
- Shell of Ampelita lachesis (specimen at Naturalis Biodiversity Center)

Scientific classification
- Kingdom: Animalia
- Phylum: Mollusca
- Class: Gastropoda
- Order: Stylommatophora
- Family: Acavidae
- Genus: Ampelita
- Species: A. lachesis

Binomial name
- Ampelita lachesis (Deshayes, 1850)

Synonyms
- Ampelita lachesis var. lachesis (Deshayes, 1850); Ampelita lachesis var. monacha (Mabille, 1884) (preoccupied name, not Pfeiffer, 1859); Helix (Ampelita) lachesis Deshayes, 1850 superseded combination; Helix lachesis Deshayes, 1850 superseded combination

= Ampelita lachesis =

Species of gastropod

Ampelita lachesis is a species of tropical air-breathing land snail, a terrestrial pulmonate gastropod mollusk in the family Acavidae.

== Description ==
The height of the shell attains 20 mm, its diameter 45 mm.

(Original description in French) This shell closely resembles Ampelita atropos but possesses distinct characteristics. It is orbicular-depressed with a subconical, obtusely tipped spire of five regular whorls. The early whorls are nearly flat and contiguous, suggesting angularity in juvenile shells. The last two whorls are more convex with a shallow suture. The body whorl is proportionally larger, obscurely angular at the periphery, and features a large central umbilicus nearly equal in diameter to the whorl itself. The smooth exterior displays only faint, irregular growth striae. The aperture is oval-oblong to subquadrangular, transverse, wider than high, and very oblique (20 degrees to the longitudinal axis), sloping basally. In profile, the upper right edge curves sharply and extends well below the circumference, almost perpendicular to the aperture. The lower outer lip, initially nearly parallel, curves inward at the umbilicus. The lower extremity stops at the umbilicus edge, curving toward the upper, though remaining separated by approximately two-fifths of the penultimate whorl.

The thickened lip is pinkish-brown in its upper half and at the umbilicus, whitish elsewhere, barely reflected above but more so below. Coloration is simple: maroon brown, reddish above to the last whorl's periphery, with the umbilicus interior similarly colored; the upper surface is milky white. The shell is thin and fragile.

== Distribution ==
This species is endemic to Madagascar.
