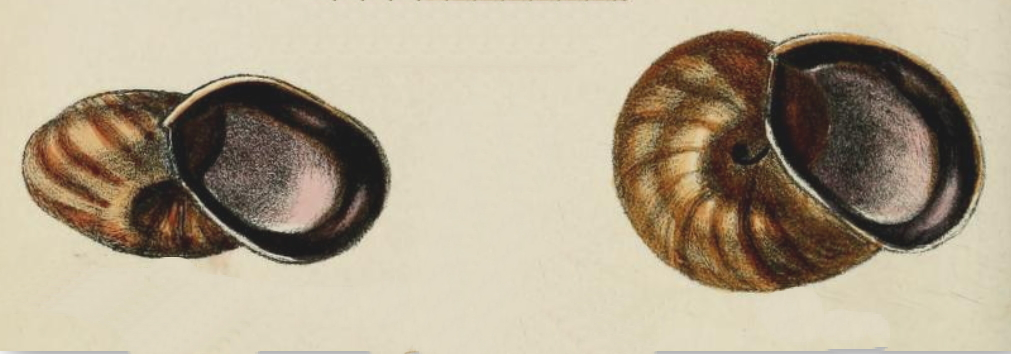
- Shell of Ampelita watersi (holotype)

Scientific classification
- Domain: Eukaryota
- Kingdom: Animalia
- Phylum: Mollusca
- Class: Gastropoda
- Order: Stylommatophora
- Family: Acavidae
- Genus: Ampelita
- Species: A. watersi

Binomial name
- Ampelita watersi (Angas, 1877)

Synonyms
- Helix (Ampelita) watersi (Angas, 1877); Helix watersi Angas, 1877 superseded combination

= Ampelita watersi =

Species of gastropod

Ampelita watersi is a species of tropical air-breathing land snail, a terrestrial pulmonate gastropod mollusk in the family Acavidae.

== Description ==
(Original description) This discoidal shell is rather solid and features a small, compressed umbilicus. Its surface is obliquely closely striated with irregular, somewhat undulating, erect striae, crossed by numerous concentric lines, resulting in a minutely reticulated appearance at the intersections. Light purplish-brown, darkening behind the lip, the shell is partially covered by a pale straw-colored epidermis. The spire is depressed, with four rapidly increasing, somewhat convex whorls. The body whorl is very wide, swollen, and bluntly keeled, with a slight depression above the keel. The nearly horizontal aperture is transversely lunate-ovate, margined within by a broad purplish-black band, with a pale lilac interior. The thickened, expanded, and reflected peristome is edged with white, and its margins approximate and are joined by a callus.

== Distribution ==
This species is endemic to Madagascar.
