= Ampelita calida =

Scientific classification
- Kingdom: Animalia
- Phylum: Mollusca
- Class: Gastropoda
- Order: Stylommatophora
- Family: Acavidae
- Genus: Ampelita
- Species: A. calida

Binomial name
- Ampelita calida Fischer-Piette, F. Blanc & Salvat, 1975

Species of gastropod

Ampelita calida is a species of tropical air-breathing land snail, a terrestrial pulmonate gastropod mollusk in the family Acavidae. Ampelita calida is a recognized species in the genus Ampelita and its taxonomic status is confirmed by the authoritative World Register of Marine Species. It is part of a genus of colorful land snails that are endemic to Madagascar and inhabit native rainforests, where many species remain rare and are difficult to locate.

== Description ==
The height of the shell attains 20.5 mm, its diameter 32 mm.

== Distribution ==
This species is endemic to Madagascar.
