= Ampelita soulaiana =

Conservation status
- Vulnerable (IUCN 2.3)

Scientific classification
- Kingdom: Animalia
- Phylum: Mollusca
- Class: Gastropoda
- Order: Stylommatophora
- Family: Acavidae
- Genus: Ampelita
- Species: A. soulaiana

Binomial name
- Ampelita soulaiana Fischer-Piette, Cauquoin & Testud, 1973

Species of gastropod

Ampelita soulaiana is a species of tropical air-breathing land snail, a terrestrial pulmonate gastropod mollusk in the family Acavidae.

== Distribution ==
This species is endemic to Madagascar.
