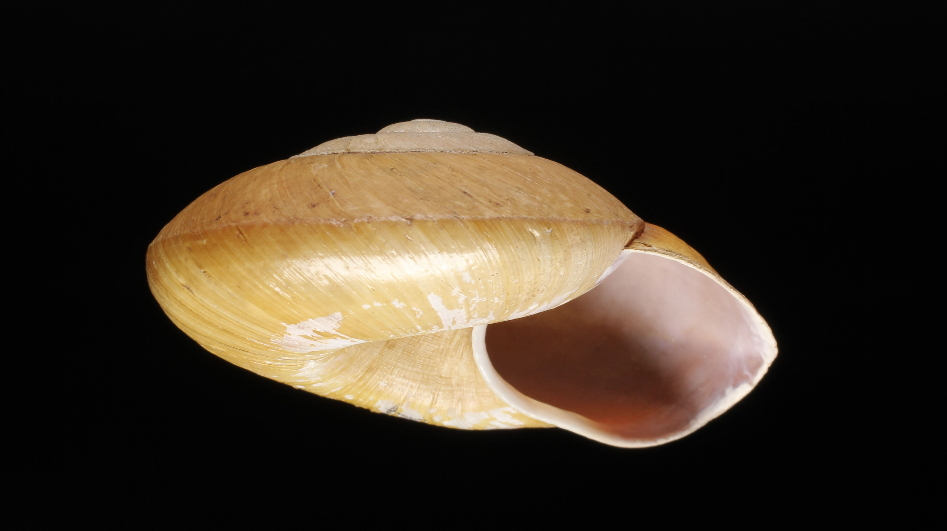
- Shell of Ampelita suarezensis (syntype at MNHN, Paris)

Scientific classification
- Kingdom: Animalia
- Phylum: Mollusca
- Class: Gastropoda
- Order: Stylommatophora
- Family: Acavidae
- Genus: Ampelita
- Species: A. suarezensis

Binomial name
- Ampelita suarezensis (Crosse & P. Fischer, 1877)

Synonyms
- Helix suarezensis Crosse & P. Fischer, 1877 (original combination)

= Ampelita suarezensis =

Species of gastropod

Ampelita suarezensis is a species of tropical air-breathing land snail, a terrestrial pulmonate gastropod mollusk in the family Acavidae.

== Description ==
The height of the shell attains 20 mm, its diameter 46 mm.

(Original description in Latin) The shell is widely and previously umbilicate. The shell is somewhat depressed and is moderately thick. It shows suboblique rugose striations, and has a uniform pale olive-tawny color. The spire is slightly prominent with a flattened apex. The suture is strongly impressed. Five rather flat whorls are present, the first two somewhat rugose. The body whorl scarcely descends, featuring a strong keel slightly above the middle, a more convex base, and flattening around the umbilicus. The aperture is obliquely subhorizontal, lunate-elliptical, and livid violet-brown inside. The peristome is simple, dirty whitish, with margins joined by a very thin, violet-brown callus. The columellar margin is somewhat dilated, slightly reflexed, and slightly sinuous, while the basal and outer margins are attenuated and subacute.

== Distribution ==
This species is endemic to Madagascar.
