= Ampelita granulosa =

Scientific classification
- Kingdom: Animalia
- Phylum: Mollusca
- Class: Gastropoda
- Order: Stylommatophora
- Family: Acavidae
- Genus: Ampelita
- Species: A. granulosa

Binomial name
- Ampelita granulosa (Deshayes, 1850)

Synonyms
- Ampelita (Ampelita) granulosa (Deshayes, 1850) alternative representation; Helix (Ampelita) granulosa Deshayes, 1850 superseded combination; Helix granulosa Deshayes, 1850 superseded combination

Species of gastropod

Ampelita granulosa is a species of tropical air-breathing land snail, a terrestrial pulmonate gastropod mollusk in the family Acavidae.

== Description ==
The height of the shell attains 17 mm, its diameter 45 mm.

(Original description in French) This orbicular-flattened shell has a subconical spire with a very depressed apex. The six regular, convex whorls are separated by a deep, sub-channeled suture. The whorls are narrow, with the body whorl obscurely angular at the periphery and convex below. A large, funnel-shaped umbilicus, equal in diameter to the body whorl, reveals all spire whorls from below. The outer surface is covered with numerous growth striae, which, unlike most species, are composed of oblong granulations linked like rosary beads. The aperture is extremely oblique, angled 25-30 degrees to the longitudinal axis. The upper right lip terminates well below the penultimate whorl's circumference, while the lower lip curves towards it. The slightly thickened left edge completes the aperture. The aperture is oval-oblong, wider than high, and its brownish right edge is strongly flared outwards. In profile, this edge exhibits a deep, re-entrant sinuosity corresponding to the body whorl's angle. The shell is a very pale brownish color above and white below.

== Distribution ==
This species is endemic to Madagascar.
