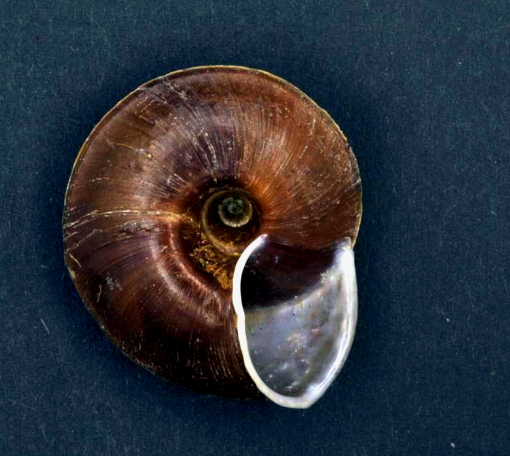
- Shell of Ampelita xystera (specimen at Naturalis Biodiversity Center)

Scientific classification
- Kingdom: Animalia
- Phylum: Mollusca
- Class: Gastropoda
- Order: Stylommatophora
- Family: Acavidae
- Genus: Ampelita
- Species: A. xystera

Binomial name
- Ampelita xystera (L. Pfeiffer, 1841)

Synonyms
- Ampelita (Xystera) xystera (L. Pfeiffer, 1841) alternative representation; Ampelita hemioxia Pilsbry, 1894 junior subjective synonym; Ampelita shavi (E. A. Smith, 1879); Ampelita sikorae Ancey, 1890 (junior synonym); Helix (Ampelita) shavi E. A. Smith, 1879 (junior synonym); Helix novacula (misspelling of specific epithet); Helix novaeula E. von Martens, 1879 junior objective synonym; Helix subfunebris Mabille, 1886 (junior synonym); Helix xystera L. Pfeiffer, 1841 (original combination)

= Ampelita xystera =

Species of gastropod

Ampelita xystera is a species of tropical air-breathing land snail, a terrestrial pulmonate gastropod mollusk in the family Acavidae.

== Description ==
The height of the shell attains 16 mm, its diameter 45 mm.

(Original description in Latin) The shell is orbicular, depressed, and umbilicate, characterized by a very sharp keel. It is thin, translucent, and olive-brown in color. The suture is barely discernible. The shell exhibits four flat whorls that increase rapidly in size, with the body whorl being convex at the base. The umbilicus is wide, funnel-shaped, pervious, and margined. The aperture is very oblique, depressed, and irregular in shape. The peristome is reflexed and sinuate, and the columellar margin ascends in a nearly straight line.

== Distribution ==
This species is endemic to Madagascar.
