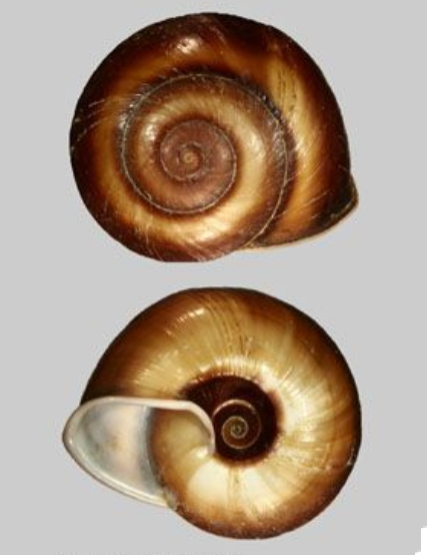
- Shell of Ampelita basizona (specimen at the Natural History Museum Rotterdam)

Scientific classification
- Kingdom: Animalia
- Phylum: Mollusca
- Class: Gastropoda
- Order: Stylommatophora
- Family: Acavidae
- Genus: Ampelita
- Species: A. basizona

Binomial name
- Ampelita basizona Mousson, 1882

Synonyms
- Ampelita (Helix) basizona Mousson, 1882 (basionym); Ampelita calypso (L. Pfeiffer, 1862) (name based on junior primary homonym); Helix (Ampelita) gonostyla Ancey, 1882 (junior synonym); Helix calypso L. Pfeiffer, 1862; Helix cyanostoma Mabille, 1884 (junior synonym); Helix galactostomella Mabille, 1886 (junior synonym)

= Ampelita basizona =

Species of gastropod

Ampelita basizona is a species of tropical air-breathing land snail, a terrestrial pulmonate gastropod mollusk in the family Acavidae.

== Description ==
(Original description in Latin) The solid shell is well umbilicated, depressed-conical and somewhat shiny, with unequal striations and a brownish-black color. The spire is depressed-conical and regular, with a very obtuse, denuded, grayish apex and a distinct suture. Five moderately increasing whorls are present, the first rather flat, the others becoming convex. The body whorl barely descends, is obtusely angled, less convex below, and tightly rounded towards the open umbilicus. A broad, yellow band encircles the middle. The oblique (45° to the axis) aperture is obtusely triangular and violaceous-gray within. The whitish peristome is shortly expanded and reflexed, its strongly converging margins joined by a thin, translucent lamina. The upper margin is curvedly produced, the basal margin nearly straight, and both ascend abruptly at the insertion, not encroaching on the umbilicus.

== Distribution ==
This species is endemic to Madagascar.
