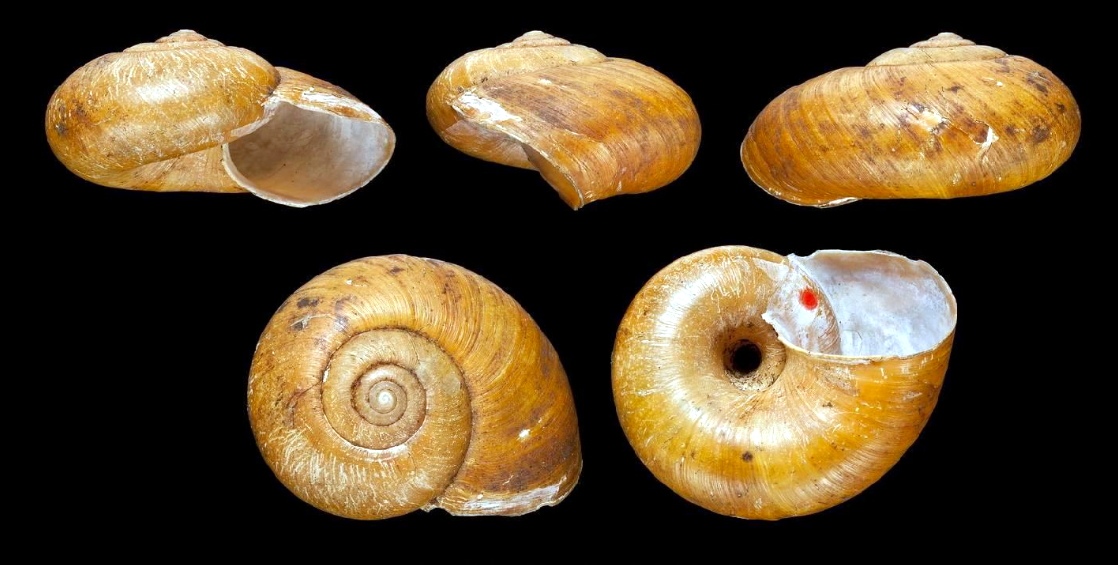
- Shell of Ampelita covani (specimen at the Natural History Museum, London)

Scientific classification
- Domain: Eukaryota
- Kingdom: Animalia
- Phylum: Mollusca
- Class: Gastropoda
- Order: Stylommatophora
- Family: Acavidae
- Genus: Ampelita
- Species: A. covani

Binomial name
- Ampelita covani (E. A. Smith, 1879)

Synonyms
- Helix (Macrocyclis) covani E. A. Smith, 1879 (original combination); Rhytida covani (E. A. Smith, 1879) superseded combination

= Ampelita covani =

Species of gastropod

Ampelita covani is a species of tropical air-breathing land snail, a terrestrial pulmonate gastropod mollusk in the family Acavidae.

== Description ==
The height of the shell attains 16 mm, its diameter 36 mm.

The species' moderately thick, orbicularly depressed shell features a broad, open umbilicus. Its lightish-brown color, transitioning to olivaceous on the spire, is marked by decussate sculpture of fine spiral striae and oblique growth lines, creating a subgranulated surface. The depressed spire, with slightly convex outlines and a somewhat raised apex, consists of 5 to 5.5 rather convex whorls, increasing gradually and separated by an impressed suture. The large, rounded body whorl descends slightly and is compressed anteriorly, exhibiting weaker sculpture beneath (except within the umbilicus) and lacking any umbilical angulation. The umbilicus is open and perspective to the apex. The oblique aperture is white. The peristome is subsimple; its upper margin is prominent medially, thin, and seemingly barely expanded, while the columellar edge is slightly thickened, expanded, and reflexed.

== Distribution ==
This species is endemic to Madagascar.
