= Ampelita vesconis =

Scientific classification
- Domain: Eukaryota
- Kingdom: Animalia
- Phylum: Mollusca
- Class: Gastropoda
- Order: Stylommatophora
- Family: Acavidae
- Genus: Ampelita
- Species: A. vesconis

Binomial name
- Ampelita vesconis (Morelet, 1851)

Synonyms
- Helix vesconis Morelet, 1851 (original combination); Helix (Ampelita) vesconis Morelet, 1851

Species of gastropod

Ampelita vesconis is a species of tropical air-breathing land snail, a terrestrial pulmonate gastropod mollusk in the family Acavidae.

== Description ==
The height of the shell attains 7 mm, its diameter 44 mm.

(Original description in Latin) The shell is umbilicate and orbicularly convex. It is chestnut in coloration and exhibits oblique costulate striations. It is characterized by five narrow, whitish-red zones: one located at the suture, another median, and a third that circumscribes the umbilical area. The shell consists of five gradually increasing whorls. The body whorl is convex at the base and slightly deflected anteriorly. The aperture is oblique, oval, and exhibits a uniform internal coloration. The peristome is only slightly thickened, with a somewhat straight outer lip and a slightly reflexed columellar margin.

== Distribution ==
This species is endemic to Madagascar.
