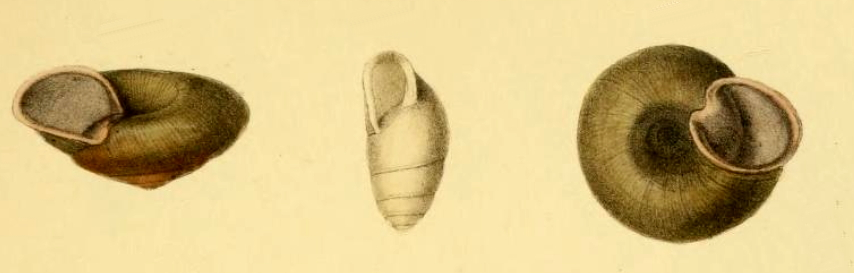
- Shell of Ampelita alluaudi (holotype)

Scientific classification
- Kingdom: Animalia
- Phylum: Mollusca
- Class: Gastropoda
- Order: Stylommatophora
- Family: Acavidae
- Genus: Ampelita
- Species: A. alluaudi

Binomial name
- Ampelita alluaudi (Dautzenberg, 1895)

Synonyms
- Helix (Ampelita) alluaudi Dautzenberg, 1895 (original combination)

= Ampelita alluaudi =

Species of gastropod

Ampelita alluaudi is a species of tropical air-breathing land snail, a terrestrial pulmonate gastropod mollusk in the family Acavidae.

== Description ==
The length of the shell attains 16 mm, its diameter 22 mm.

(Original description in French) The shell is depressed and solid, consisting of five flattened whorls. The surface is marked by curved growth lines. The body whorl, which descends significantly, has a prominent keel that diminishes towards the aperture. The base of the shell is convex and features a wide, deep umbilicus. The aperture is small and rounded, with a thickened, reflected lip. The coloration transitions from whitish on the early whorls to brownish-brown on the penultimate whorl and blackish-brown on the body whorl. The peristome is purplish-brown, with a slightly lighter columellar border.

== Distribution ==
This species is endemic to Madagascar.
