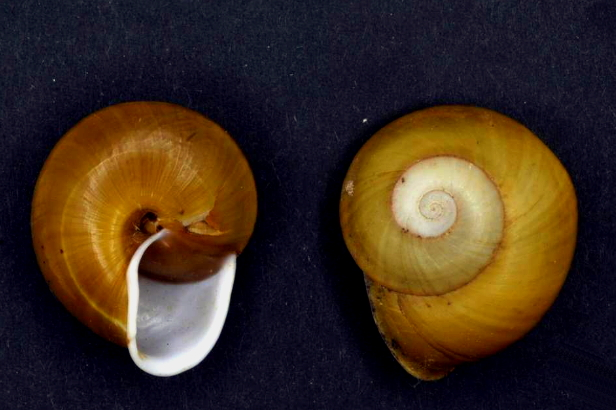
- Shell of Ampelita lancula (specien at Naturalis Biodiversity Center)

Scientific classification
- Kingdom: Animalia
- Phylum: Mollusca
- Class: Gastropoda
- Order: Stylommatophora
- Family: Acavidae
- Genus: Ampelita
- Species: A. lancula

Binomial name
- Ampelita lancula (A. Férussac, 1821)

Synonyms
- Helix cazenavetti Fischer & Bernardi, 1857 (junior synonym); Helix guillaini Petit de la Saussaye, 1850 (junior synonym); Helix lancula A. Férussac, 1821 (original combination); Helix terveriana Grateloup, 1840 (junior synonym)

= Ampelita lancula =

Species of gastropod

Ampelita lancula is a species of tropical air-breathing land snail, a terrestrial pulmonate gastropod mollusk in the family Acavidae. The snail was originally described by André Étienne d'Audebert de Férussac (French Naturalist) in 1821. He originally placed it in the genus Helix, calling it Helix Lancula.

== Description ==
The height of the shell attains 20 mm, its diameter is 37 mm. The shell shape is classified as "depressed" or "heliciform" meaning it is structurally flattened.

It is strictly an endemic species.

== Distribution ==
This species is endemic to Madagascar.
