= Ampelita consanguinea =

Scientific classification
- Kingdom: Animalia
- Phylum: Mollusca
- Class: Gastropoda
- Order: Stylommatophora
- Family: Acavidae
- Genus: Ampelita
- Species: A. consanguinea

Binomial name
- Ampelita consanguinea (Deshayes, 1850)

Synonyms
- Helix (Ampelita) consanguinea Deshayes, 1850 superseded combination; Helix consanguinea Deshayes, 1850 superseded combination

Species of gastropod

Ampelita consanguinea is a species of tropical air-breathing land snail, a terrestrial pulmonate gastropod mollusk in the family Acavidae.

== Description ==
The height of the shell attains 28 mm, its diameter 45 mm.

(Original description in French) This orbicular-depressed shell consists of five whorls. The spire is subconical with an obtuse apex.

The early whorls are whitish, slightly convex, and nearly contiguous, suggesting a possibly keeled or angular form in younger specimens. The suture is initially shallow, deepening in the final two whorls. The body whorl is regularly convex at the periphery, cylindrical, and barely depressed below, featuring a centrally located, infundibuliform umbilicus, abruptly bordered by an obtuse angle. The umbilicus diameter is slightly more than a third of the body whorl's diameter. The shell's smooth surface displays only faint, irregular growth striae. The oval-transverse aperture is wider than high and drooping, with the upper part of the right lip curving below the circumference. The lower edge barely extends above the umbilicus. The aperture's extremities are separated by slightly less than half the penultimate whorl's circumference. The aperture plane inclines at 30 degrees to the longitudinal axis. The outer lipe is quite thick, strongly reflected basally but only slightly so above. This lip is a maroon brown, varying in intensity between individuals. The shell is generally uniformly colored. On a brownish or reddish-white background, the upper spire bears two distinct, equal, dark brown bands: one at the suture, the other above the periphery. The umbilicus is consistently brown within, encircled by a whitish band.

== Distribution ==
This species is endemic to Madagascar.
