= Ampelita dingeoni =

Scientific classification
- Kingdom: Animalia
- Phylum: Mollusca
- Class: Gastropoda
- Order: Stylommatophora
- Family: Acavidae
- Genus: Ampelita
- Species: A. dingeoni

Binomial name
- Ampelita dingeoni Fischer-Piette, F. Blanc & Salvat, 1975

Species of gastropod

Ampelita dingeoni is a species of tropical air-breathing land snail, a terrestrial pulmonate gastropod mollusk in the family Acavidae.

== Description ==
The length of the shell attains 22 mm, its diameter 38.5 mm.

== Distribution ==
This species is endemic to Madagascar.
