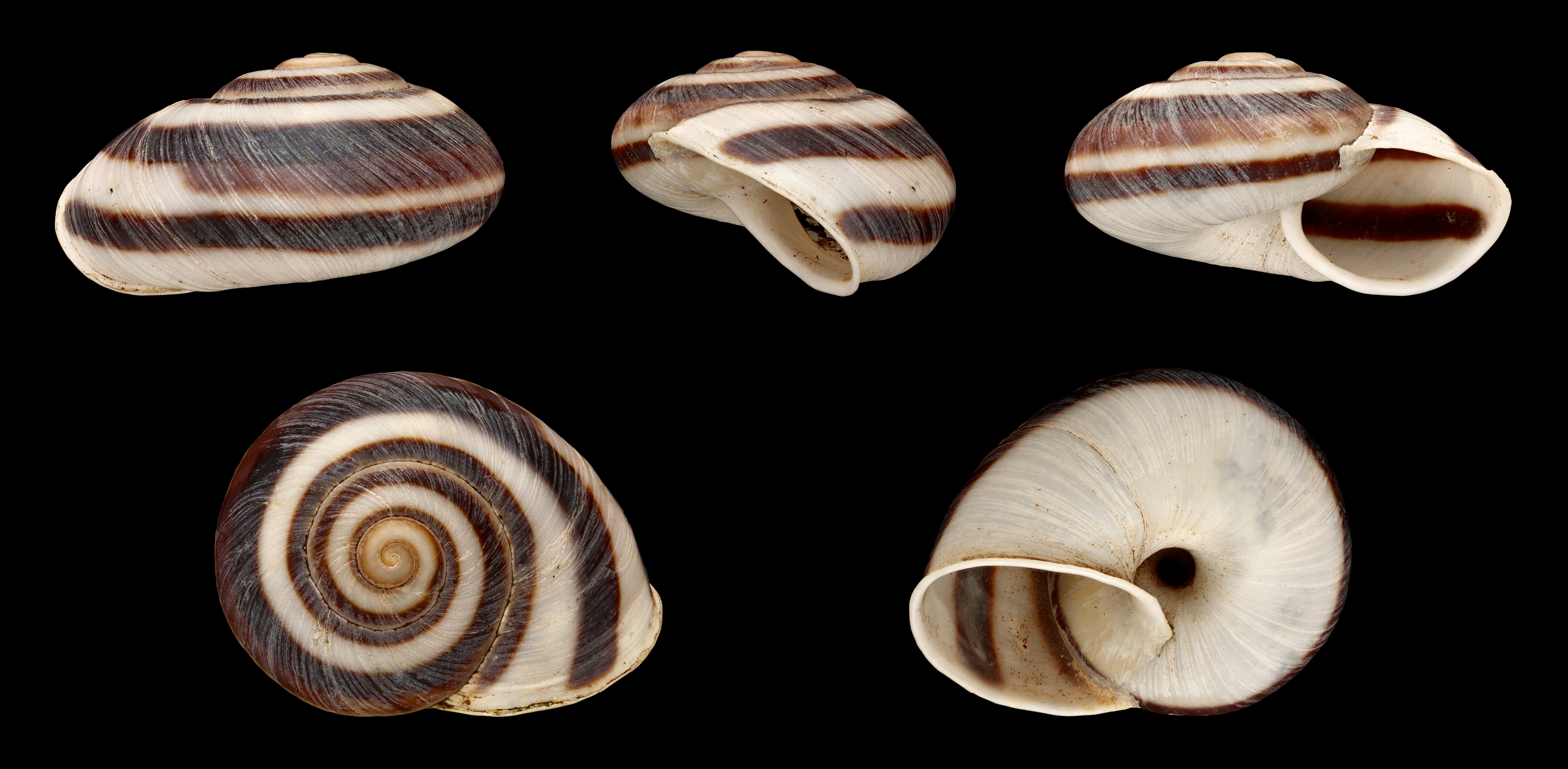
- Shell of Ampelita duvalii

Scientific classification
- Kingdom: Animalia
- Phylum: Mollusca
- Class: Gastropoda
- Order: Stylommatophora
- Family: Acavidae
- Genus: Ampelita
- Species: A. duvalii

Binomial name
- Ampelita duvalii (Petit de la Saussaye, 1844)

Synonyms
- Helix duvalii Petit de la Saussaye, 1844 (original combination)

= Ampelita duvalii =

Species of gastropod

Ampelita duvalii is a species of tropical air-breathing land snail, a terrestrial pulmonate gastropod mollusk in the family Acavidae.

== Description ==
The height of the shell attains 21 mm, its diameter 40 mm.

(Original description in Latin) This orbicular, depressed-conical shell is brown with a decussate (crossed) sculpture. Five slightly convex whorls are separated by a distinct, brown-bordered suture. The body whorl features a yellowish band, and the base is also yellowish. The aperture is oval, with a reflected peristome, and a wide, deep umbilicus.

== Distribution ==
This species is endemic to Madagascar.
