= Ampelita unicolor =

Scientific classification
- Kingdom: Animalia
- Phylum: Mollusca
- Class: Gastropoda
- Order: Stylommatophora
- Family: Acavidae
- Genus: Ampelita
- Species: A. unicolor

Binomial name
- Ampelita unicolor (L. Pfeiffer, 1845)

Synonyms
- Helix unicolor L. Pfeiffer, 1845 (original combination)

Species of gastropod

Ampelita unicolor is a species of tropical air-breathing land snail, a terrestrial pulmonate gastropod mollusk in the family Acavidae.

== Description ==
The height of the shell attains 16 mm, its diameter 32 mm.

(Original description in Latin) The shell is umbilicated and depressed. It is characterized by a sharp keel and a thin, brown structure. Its upper surface is finely striated, while the lower surface features several raised spiral lines. The spire is depressed-conoidal. The shell comprises five rather flat whorls, which gradually increase in size. The body whorl does not descend anteriorly, and the base is convex, exhibiting an abrupt angle at the narrow umbilicus. The aperture is rhomboidal. The peristome is dark brown, with its margins connected by a very thin callus. The upper margin is dilated and expanded, the basal margin is ascending and straight, and the columellar margin is short, dilated, partially concealing the umbilicus, and forms an angular junction with the basal margin.

== Distribution ==
This species is endemic to Madagascar.
