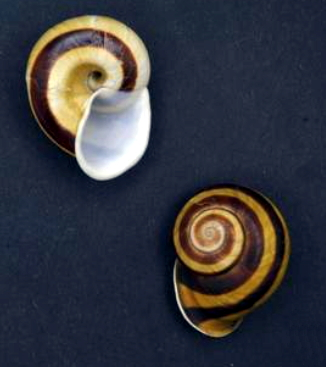
- Shell of Ampelita sepulcralis (specimen at Naturalis Biodiversity Center)

Scientific classification
- Kingdom: Animalia
- Phylum: Mollusca
- Class: Gastropoda
- Order: Stylommatophora
- Family: Acavidae
- Genus: Ampelita
- Species: A. sepulcralis

Binomial name
- Ampelita sepulcralis (A. Férussac, 1821)

Synonyms
- Ampelita sepulcralis var. funebris E. von Martens, 1879 junior subjective synonym; Ampelita sepulcralis var. olivacea (Pilsbry, 1890) unavailable name; Helix (Ampelita) eurychila Crosse & P. Fischer, 1883 (junior synonym); Helix (Ampelita) eurychila var. minor Crosse & P. Fischer, 1883; Helix (Helicella) sepulcralis A. Férussac, 1821 (original combination); Helix excoriata E. von Martens, 1883 (junior synonym); Helix labrella Lamarck, 1822 junior subjective synonym; Helix sepulcralis A. Férussac, 1821 superseded combination; Helix sepulcralis var. funebris E. von Martens, 1879; Helix sepulcralis var. olivacea Pilsbry, 1890 (invalid; name preoccupied); Helix sepulcralis var. praeclara Crosse & P. Fischer, 1890 (junior synonym); Helix sepulcralis var. proeclara (incorrect subsequent spelling); Helix sganziniana Crosse & P. Fischer, 1876 (junior synonym)

= Ampelita sepulcralis =

Species of gastropod

Ampelita sepulcralis is a species of tropical air-breathing land snail, a terrestrial pulmonate gastropod mollusk in the family Acavidae.

Varieties

- Ampelita sepulcralis var. alba Fischer-Piette & Garreau, 1965 (uncertain > unassessed)
- Ampelita sepulcralis var. lethifera (Crosse & P. Fischer, 1890) (uncertain > unassessed)

== Description ==
The height of the shell attains 23.2 mm, its diameter 44.2 mm.

This shell contains 4.4 whorls. The body whorl is convex below the suture, transitioning to concave before a weak carina above the shell margin, with the remaining periphery evenly rounded. The spire is flat, and the suture is deeply impressed and broadly guttered.

The aperture, measured parallel to the line connecting the upper and lower peristome insertions, is 10.61 mm in height (2.27 times the peristome insertion distance). Its width, perpendicular to this line, is 20.59 mm (0.47 times the shell diameter), resulting in an aperture height-to-width ratio of 0.52. The penultimate aperture protrudes 2.0 mm (0.10 times the aperture width) into the final aperture. The peristome is slightly reflected.

The umbilicus is wide, revealing all previous whorls. Embryonic sculpture consists of large pustules and broad, rounded growth lines in the sutures. Post-embryonic sculpture is densely pustulate.

The shell's general color is a uniform light brown. The umbilicus is bordered by a cream-colored band, which is further bordered by two darker brown bands.

== Distribution ==
This species is endemic to Madagascar.
