= Ampelita pfeifferi =

Scientific classification
- Kingdom: Animalia
- Phylum: Mollusca
- Class: Gastropoda
- Order: Stylommatophora
- Family: Acavidae
- Genus: Ampelita
- Species: A. pfeifferi

Binomial name
- Ampelita pfeifferi Fischer-Piette, 1952

Species of gastropod

Ampelita pfeifferi is a species of tropical air-breathing land snail, a terrestrial pulmonate gastropod mollusk in the family Acavidae.

== Distribution ==
This species is endemic to Madagascar.
