= Ampelita stephani =

Scientific classification
- Kingdom: Animalia
- Phylum: Mollusca
- Class: Gastropoda
- Order: Stylommatophora
- Family: Acavidae
- Genus: Ampelita
- Species: A. stephani

Binomial name
- Ampelita stephani Fischer-Piette, Cauquoin & Testud, 1973

Species of gastropod

Ampelita stephani is a species of tropical air-breathing land snail, a terrestrial pulmonate gastropod mollusk in the family Acavidae.

== Description ==
The height of the shell attains 15 mm, its diameter 27 mm.

== Distribution ==
This species is endemic to Madagascar.
