= Ampelita milloti =

Scientific classification
- Kingdom: Animalia
- Phylum: Mollusca
- Class: Gastropoda
- Order: Stylommatophora
- Family: Acavidae
- Genus: Ampelita
- Species: A. milloti

Binomial name
- Ampelita milloti Fischer-Piette, 1952

Species of gastropod

Ampelita milloti is a species of tropical air-breathing land snail, a terrestrial pulmonate gastropod mollusk in the family Acavidae.

== Description ==
The diameter of the shell attains 24.8 mm.

== Distribution ==
This species is endemic to Madagascar.
