= Ampelita caderyi =

Scientific classification
- Kingdom: Animalia
- Phylum: Mollusca
- Class: Gastropoda
- Order: Stylommatophora
- Family: Acavidae
- Genus: Ampelita
- Species: A. caderyi

Binomial name
- Ampelita caderyi Fischer-Piette, C. P. Blanc, F. Blanc & F. Salvat, 1994

Species of gastropod

Ampelita caderyi is a species of tropical air-breathing land snail, a terrestrial pulmonate gastropod mollusk in the family Acavidae.

== Distribution ==
This species is endemic to Madagascar.
