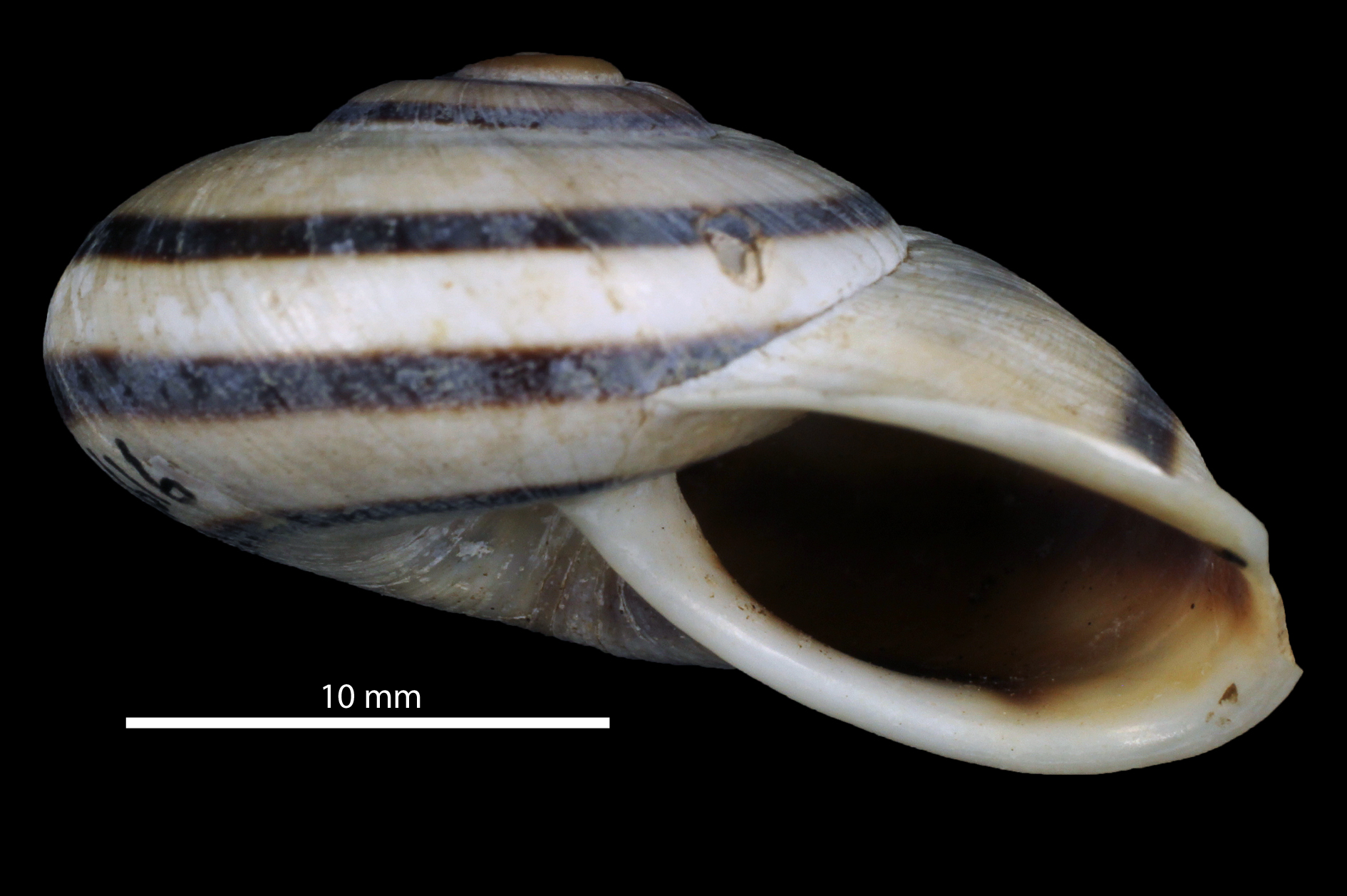
- Shell of Ampelita andriamamonjyi (paratype at MNHN, Paris)

Scientific classification
- Kingdom: Animalia
- Phylum: Mollusca
- Class: Gastropoda
- Order: Stylommatophora
- Family: Acavidae
- Genus: Ampelita
- Species: A. andriamamonjyi

Binomial name
- Ampelita andriamamonjyi O. L. Griffiths & D. G. Herbert, 2013

= Ampelita andriamamonjyi =

Species of gastropod

Ampelita andriamamonjyi is a species of tropical air-breathing land snail, a terrestrial pulmonate gastropod mollusk in the family Acavidae.

== Distribution ==
This species is endemic to Madagascar.
