= Ampelita stumpffii =

Scientific classification
- Kingdom: Animalia
- Phylum: Mollusca
- Class: Gastropoda
- Order: Stylommatophora
- Family: Acavidae
- Genus: Ampelita
- Species: A. stumpffii

Binomial name
- Ampelita stumpffii (Kobelt, 1880)

Synonyms
- Helix stumpffii Kobelt, 1880 (original combination)

Species of gastropod

Ampelita stumpffii is a species of tropical air-breathing land snail, a terrestrial pulmonate gastropod mollusk in the family Acavidae.

== Description ==
The height of the shell attains 15 mm, its diameter 26 mm.

(Original description in Latin) The shell, umbilicated and sharply keeled, presents a sublenticular form and is rather thin yet solid. Its surface is sculpted with fine growth striae and densely packed spiral striae.

The shell's coloration is a yellowish-green, with variable tinting and a whitish hue towards the suture, culminating in a lilac apex. It is ornamented with two narrow, vivid chestnut bands, one positioned near the suture and the other below the keel.

The shell comprises four rapidly increasing, somewhat flattened whorls, which are slightly impressed above the flat suture. The body whorl is sharply keeled and compressed on both sides of the keel. It does not descend anteriorly, and exhibits a gibbously inflated base, featuring a blunt crest surrounding the narrow, pervious, funnel-shaped umbilicus. The aperture is markedly oblique, irregularly rhomboidal, and pinkish internally with translucent bands. The peristome is thickened, with an expanded upper margin that is depressed towards the keel, a reflexed basal margin, and an ascending columellar margin that partially covers the umbilicus. The insertions of the peristome are not approximate.

== Distribution ==
This species is endemic to Madagascar.
