= Ampelita michellae =

Scientific classification
- Kingdom: Animalia
- Phylum: Mollusca
- Class: Gastropoda
- Order: Stylommatophora
- Family: Acavidae
- Genus: Ampelita
- Species: A. michellae

Binomial name
- Ampelita michellae K. C. Emberton & Rakotondrazafy, 2020

Species of gastropod

Ampelita michellae is a species of tropical air-breathing land snail, a terrestrial pulmonate gastropod mollusk in the family Acavidae.

First collected in 2007 in Northern Madagascar, along 34 other snails of which 13 new species, and described in detail by Kenneth C. Emberton and Judicaël A. Rakotondrazafy.

This species was named after Michelle Kintana Emberton, daughter of the author.

== Distribution ==
This species is endemic to Madagascar.
