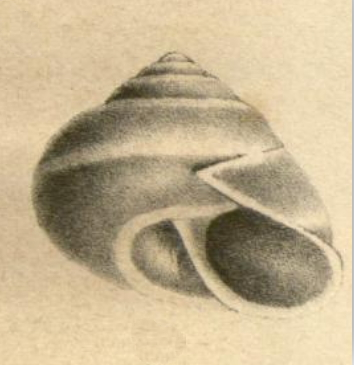
- Shell of Ampelita chlorozona (holotype)

Scientific classification
- Kingdom: Animalia
- Phylum: Mollusca
- Class: Gastropoda
- Order: Stylommatophora
- Family: Acavidae
- Genus: Ampelita
- Species: A. chlorozona

Binomial name
- Ampelita chlorozona (Grateloup, 1840)

Synonyms
- Helix chlorozona Grateloup, 1840 (original combination)

= Ampelita chlorozona =

Species of gastropod

Ampelita chlorozona is a species of tropical air-breathing land snail, a terrestrial pulmonate gastropod mollusk in the family Acavidae.

== Description ==
The height of the shell attains 18 mm, its diameter 30 mm.

(Original description in French) The transverse bands of Ampelita chlorozona are sharply defined and of a lemon-yellow color. They are located either at the sutural edge of the shell or in the middle of the body whorl near the umbilicus.

The latter penetrates into the interior of the aperture, towards the columellar summit. The aperture is regularly oval. The spire is conoid, composed of 4 to 5 whorls.

The columella and the outer lip which is slightly reflected, are of a pale yellow.

== Distribution ==
This species is endemic to Madagascar.
