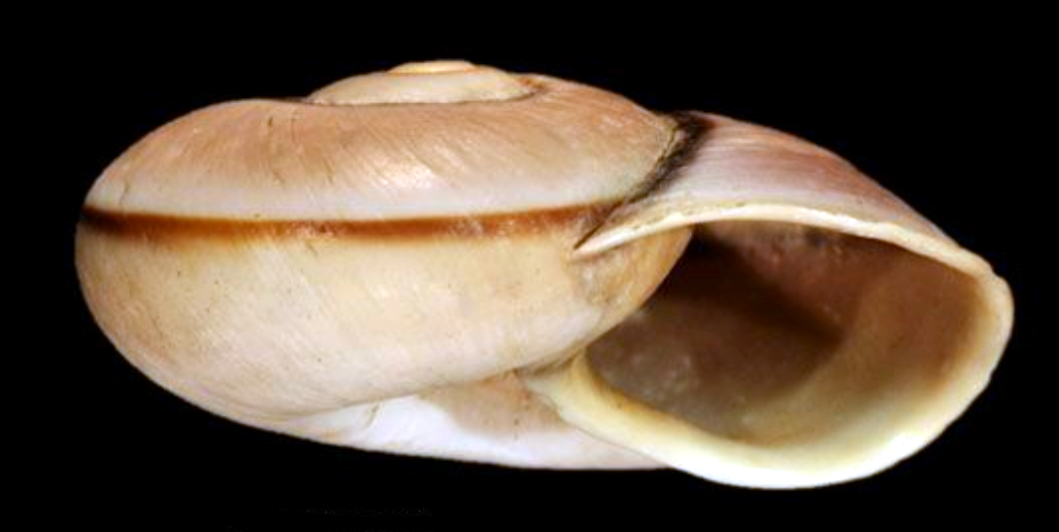
- Shell of Ampelita denisi (specimen at the Natural History Museum, Rotterdam)

Scientific classification
- Kingdom: Animalia
- Phylum: Mollusca
- Class: Gastropoda
- Order: Stylommatophora
- Family: Acavidae
- Genus: Ampelita
- Species: A. denisi

Binomial name
- Ampelita denisi Dautzenberg, 1928

Synonyms
- Helix (Ampelita) duvali Petit (pro parte)

= Ampelita denisi =

Species of gastropod

Ampelita denisi is a species of tropical air-breathing land snail, a terrestrial pulmonate gastropod mollusk in the family Acavidae.

== Description ==
The height of the shell attains 30 mm, its diameter 50 mm.

== Distribution ==
This species is endemic to Madagascar.
