= Ampelita anosiana =

Scientific classification
- Kingdom: Animalia
- Phylum: Mollusca
- Class: Gastropoda
- Order: Stylommatophora
- Family: Acavidae
- Genus: Ampelita
- Species: A. anosiana

Binomial name
- Ampelita anosiana Fischer-Piette, C. P. Blanc, F. Blanc & F. Salvat, 1994

Species of gastropod

Ampelita anosiana is a species of tropical air-breathing land snail, a terrestrial pulmonate gastropod mollusk belonging to the family Acavidae.

== Description ==
The height of the shell attains 12 mm, its diameter 26 mm.

== Distribution ==
This species is endemic to Madagascar.
