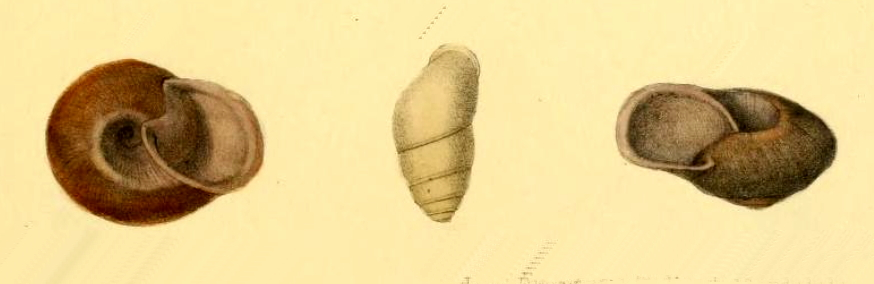
- Shell of Ampelita lamothei (holotype)

Scientific classification
- Kingdom: Animalia
- Phylum: Mollusca
- Class: Gastropoda
- Order: Stylommatophora
- Family: Acavidae
- Genus: Ampelita
- Species: A. lamothei

Binomial name
- Ampelita lamothei (Dautzenberg, 1895)

Synonyms
- Helix (Ampelita) lamothei Dautzenberg, 1895 (original combination)

= Ampelita lamothei =

Species of gastropod

Ampelita lamothei is a species of tropical air-breathing land snail, a terrestrial pulmonate gastropod mollusk in the family Acavidae.

== Description ==
The length of the shell attains 15 mm, its diameter 26 mm.

(Original description in French) This delicate shell exhibits a depressed profile, with a strongly convex basal surface. The shell surface is adorned with fine growth lines that intersect with spiral striae, creating a delicate reticulate pattern visible only under magnification. The shell comprises four whorls, the initial whorls displaying slight convexity. The body whorl is notably larger, descending significantly towards the aperture and featuring a broad, shallow decurrent depression. The base is characterized by a narrow but deep umbilicus, appearing swollen and subangular around the umbilical cavity. The aperture is distinctly oblique. The peristome is widely expanded, particularly on the side of the outer lip, which is subtly reflected. The columella is narrower and also reflected. A thin, applied callus connects the edges of the aperture. The coloration is a uniform dark brown, interrupted by a narrow, obsolete yellowish band encircling the umbilical cavity. The peristome is entirely black.

== Distribution ==
This species is endemic to Madagascar.
