= Ampelita ranomafanae =

Scientific classification
- Kingdom: Animalia
- Phylum: Mollusca
- Class: Gastropoda
- Order: Stylommatophora
- Family: Acavidae
- Genus: Ampelita
- Species: A. ranomafanae

Binomial name
- Ampelita ranomafanae K. C. Emberton, 1999

Species of gastropod

Ampelita ranomafanae is a species of tropical air-breathing land snail, a terrestrial pulmonate gastropod mollusk in the family Acavidae.

== Distribution ==
This species is endemic to Madagascar.
