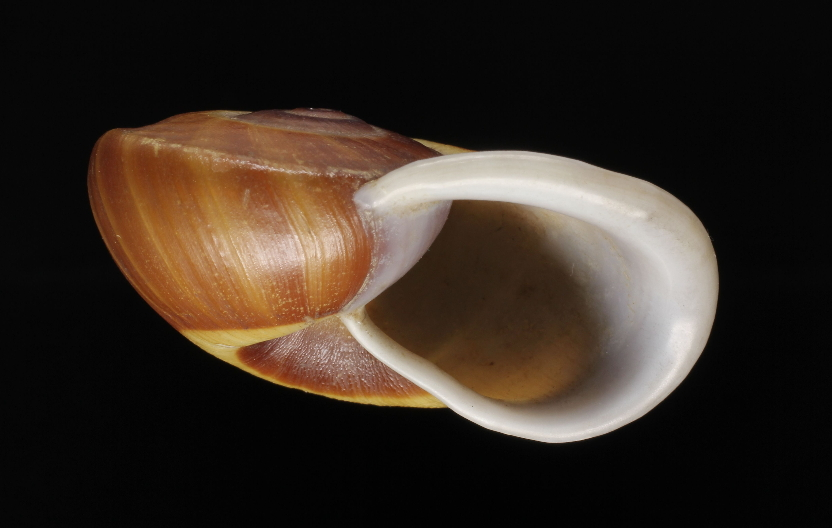
- Shell of Ampelita lamarei (specimen at MNHN, Paris)

Scientific classification
- Kingdom: Animalia
- Phylum: Mollusca
- Class: Gastropoda
- Order: Stylommatophora
- Family: Acavidae
- Genus: Ampelita
- Species: A. lamarei

Binomial name
- Ampelita lamarei (L. Pfeiffer, 1853)

Synonyms
- Ampelita pauliana Fischer-Piette, 1952 (junior synonym); Helix lamarei L. Pfeiffer, 1853 (original combination); Helix stragulum Crosse & P. Fischer, 1873 (junior synonym)

= Ampelita lamarei =

Species of gastropod

Ampelita lamarei is a species of tropical air-breathing land snail, a terrestrial pulmonate gastropod mollusk in the family Acavidae.

Subspecies
Ampelita lamarei dendritica Verdcourt, 2006
Variety
Ampelita lamarei var. sakalava (Angas, 1877)

== Description ==
(Original description in Latin as Helix stragulum) This narrowly umbilicated, very depressed shell is thin, minutely granulose under magnification, and longitudinally impressed with fine growth lines. Chestnut-brown with rare yellowish-straw spots, it features a sub-flattened spire with an obtuse apex and an impressed suture. Four flattened, rapidly increasing whorls are present, the upper 2.5 violaceous-brown, and the body whorl bordered with yellow at the suture. The body whorl is large, sub-depressed above, angulate-keeled slightly above the periphery, and has a convex, inflated base, sub-angulate around the umbilicus. The umbilicus area is dark chestnut, encircled by a pale yellow zone. The large, very oblique, elliptical-ovate aperture is bluish-white inside. The bluish-white peristome is widely reflexed, with margins joined by a thin callus, and the outer margin dilated medially and near the insertion.

== Distribution ==
This species is endemic to Madagascar.
