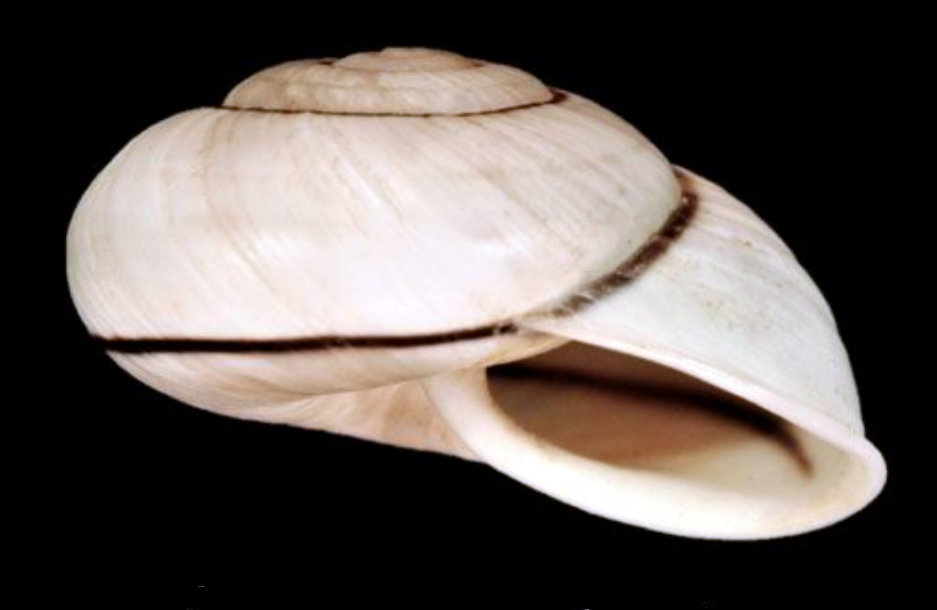
- Shell of Ampelita robillardi (specimen at the Natural History Museum Rotterdam)

Scientific classification
- Kingdom: Animalia
- Phylum: Mollusca
- Class: Gastropoda
- Order: Stylommatophora
- Family: Acavidae
- Genus: Ampelita
- Species: A. robillardi

Binomial name
- Ampelita robillardi (H. Adams & Angas, 1876)

Synonyms
- Ampelita (Vescona) robillardi (H. Adams & Angas, 1876) alternative representation; Helix robillardi H. Adams & Angas, 1876 superseded combination

= Ampelita robillardi =

Species of gastropod

Ampelita robillardi is a species of tropical air-breathing land snail, a terrestrial pulmonate gastropod mollusk in the family Acavidae.

== Description ==
The height of the shell attains 29 mm, its diameter 32 mm.

(Original description) The shell is umbilicated, orbicularly subglobose, and of moderate solidity. Its surface exhibits oblique striations and a whitish base, overlaid by a pale brown, shining epidermis. It is decorated with three very narrow dark brown bands, one of which is located at the suture.

The spire is depressedly conical, culminating in an obtuse apex. There are five moderately convex whorls, with the body whorl descending anteriorly and slightly flattened at the base. The umbilicus is open and funnel-shaped. The aperture is diagonal, truncately oval, and pale brown in its interior. The peristome margins approximate and are joined by a thin callus. The right margin is slightly flexuous, expanded, and subtly reflexed, while the columellar margin is thickened, reflexed, and dilated superiorly.

== Distribution ==
This species is endemic to Madagascar.
