= Ampelita fulgurata =

Conservation status
- Endangered (IUCN 2.3)

Scientific classification
- Kingdom: Animalia
- Phylum: Mollusca
- Class: Gastropoda
- Order: Stylommatophora
- Family: Acavidae
- Genus: Ampelita
- Species: A. fulgurata

Binomial name
- Ampelita fulgurata (G. B. Sowerby I, 1839)

Species of gastropod

Ampelita fulgurata is a species of medium-sized to large tropical air-breathing land snail, a terrestrial pulmonate gastropod mollusk in the family Acavidae.

== Distribution ==
This species is endemic to Madagascar.
