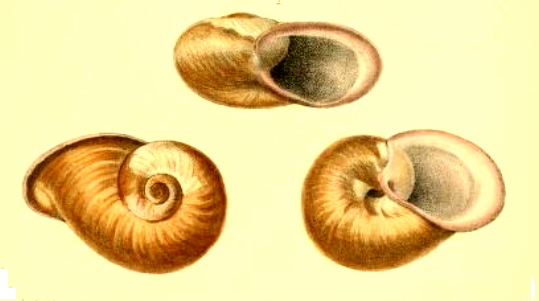
- Shell of Ampelita perampla (holotype)

Scientific classification
- Kingdom: Animalia
- Phylum: Mollusca
- Class: Gastropoda
- Order: Stylommatophora
- Family: Acavidae
- Genus: Ampelita
- Species: A. perampla

Binomial name
- Ampelita perampla Dautzenberg, 1908

Synonyms
- Helix (Ampelita) perampla Dautzenberg, 1908

= Ampelita perampla =

Species of gastropod

Ampelita perampla is a species of tropical air-breathing land snail, a terrestrial pulmonate gastropod mollusk in the family Acavidae.

== Description ==
The height of the shell attains 20 mm, its diameter 39 mm.

(Original description in French) This shell, though thin, is remarkably solid. It features an umbilicus reduced to a narrow perforation due to the penultimate whorl's base encroaching upon the umbilical cavity.

The spire is flattened with a barely protruding apex, comprising slightly convex whorls. The initial two whorls grow slowly, while the subsequent two expand rapidly. The body whorl is notably large, swollen, and slightly gibbous opposite the aperture, gently descending towards its extremity. The base is highly convex, with the umbilical region encircled by a blunt ridge. The aperture is very wide, with converging edges joined by a thin, closely adhering callus. The outer lip (labrum) is broadly flared and reflected, forming a blunt basal angle where it meets the inner lip.

The shell exhibits a whitish coloration, becoming increasingly tinged with purplish-brown towards the earlier whorls. The epidermis is a uniform tawny hue. The aperture's interior is white, and the peristome is bordered with dark brown.

== Distribution ==
This species is endemic to Madagascar.
