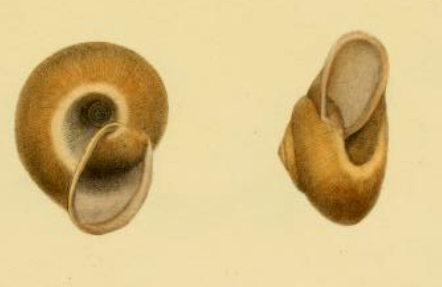
- Shell of Ampelita subatropos (holotype)

Scientific classification
- Kingdom: Animalia
- Phylum: Mollusca
- Class: Gastropoda
- Order: Stylommatophora
- Family: Acavidae
- Genus: Ampelita
- Species: A. subatropos

Binomial name
- Ampelita subatropos (Dautzenberg, 1895)

Synonyms
- Helix (Ampelita) subatropos Dautzenberg, 1895 (original combination)

= Ampelita subatropos =

Species of gastropod

Ampelita subatropos is a species of tropical air-breathing land snail, a terrestrial pulmonate gastropod mollusk in the family Acavidae.

== Description ==
The length of the shell attains 24 mm, its diameter 38 mm.

(Original description in French) The shell is somewhat flattened with a low, obtuse spire composed of five slightly convex whorls separated by well-defined sutures. The early whorls exhibit regular growth, while the body whorl expands more rapidly, particularly towards its extremity. This body whorl descends significantly towards the aperture and features a slight peripheral keel that diminishes anteriorly. The base is convex and adorned with a funnel-shaped umbilicus that reveals all underlying whorls. The shell surface is embellished with fine, granular growth lines. The body whorl exhibits prominent, oblique malleations. The aperture is notably oblique, exhibiting an elongated oval shape in the transverse plane. It is encircled by a thick, reflected peristome, with the edges closely juxtaposed and connected by a substantial, glossy callus. The shell exhibits a predominantly light yellowish-brown coloration, interrupted by a whitish zone encircling the umbilical cavity. The interior of the umbilicus is dark brown.

== Distribution ==
This species is endemic to Madagascar.
