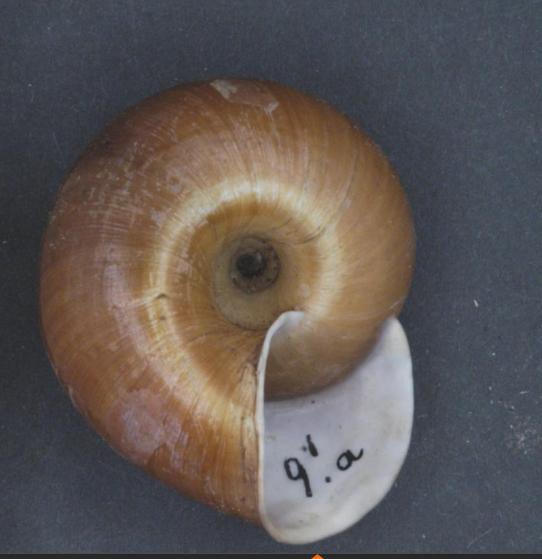
- Shell of Ampelita madagascariensis (specimen at Naturalis Biodiversity Center)

Scientific classification
- Kingdom: Animalia
- Phylum: Mollusca
- Class: Gastropoda
- Order: Stylommatophora
- Family: Acavidae
- Genus: Ampelita
- Species: A. madagascariensis

Binomial name
- Ampelita madagascariensis (Lamarck, 1816)

Synonyms
- Helix (Carocolla) madagascariensis Lamarck, 1816 (original combination); Helix lanx A. Férussac, 1821 (junior synonym); Helix lychna Mabille, 1884 (junior synonym); Helix madagascariensis Lamarck, 1816 (original combination); Helix radama R. P. Lesson, 1826 (junior synonym)

= Ampelita madagascariensis =

Species of gastropod

Ampelita madagascariensis is a species of tropical air-breathing land snail, a terrestrial pulmonate gastropod mollusk in the family Acavidae.

== Description ==
The height of the shell attains 22 mm, its diameter 48 mm.

(Original description of Helix lychna in French) This large, orbicular-depressed shell has a uniform, dark reddish-brown color above, with a whitish zone around the umbilicus below. Pronounced, nearly regular striae are accompanied by flattened areas, particularly noticeable at the periphery. Under high magnification, minute points or striae arranged longitudinally are visible on the shell's surface.

The spire is moderately elevated, with a small, obtuse apex. The well-developed body whorl is convex above, slightly compressed peripherally, and exhibits a subtle angulation in this region. The whorl is compressed below this angulation, a compression that ends at the whitish zone surrounding the umbilicus. The aperture is oval with a hint of a tetragonal shape. The peristome, very slightly thickened and obtuse, is weakly and briefly reflected.

== Distribution ==
This species is endemic to Madagascar.
