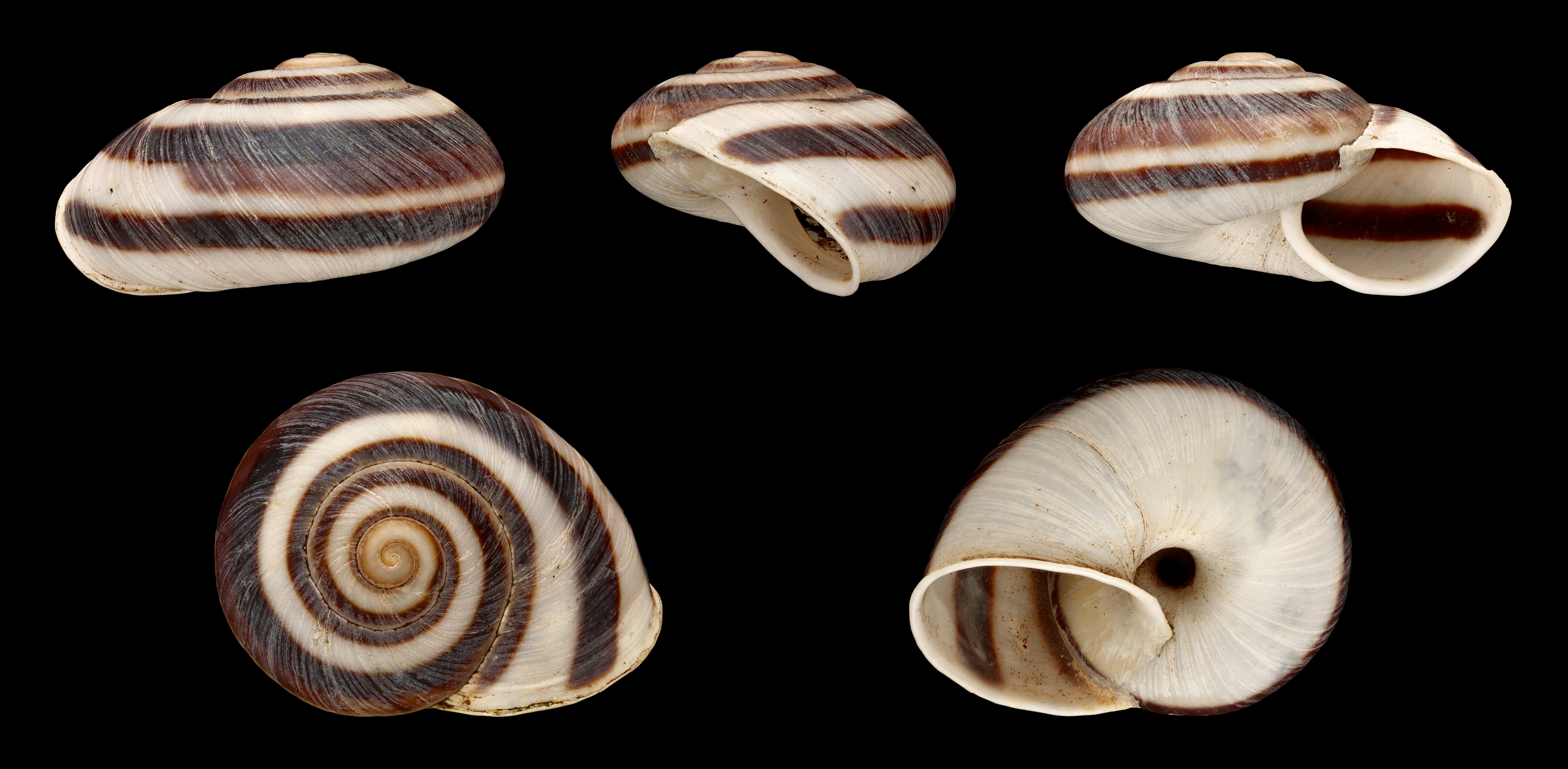
- Ampelita duvalii (Petit de la Saussaye, 1844)

Scientific classification
- Kingdom: Animalia
- Phylum: Mollusca
- Class: Gastropoda
- Order: Stylommatophora
- Family: Acavidae
- Genus: Ampelita; Beck, 1837

Type species
- Helix madagascariensis Lamarck, 1816

Synonyms
- Ampelita (Helix) Linnaeus, 1758 superseded combination; Ampelita (Vescona) Emberton, 1990 alternate representation; Ampelita (Xystera) Emberton, 1990·alternate representation; Helix (Ampelita) H. Beck, 1837

= Ampelita =

Genus of gastropods

Ampelita is a genus of air-breathing land snails, terrestrial pulmonate gastropod mollusks in the family Acavidae.

== Species ==
Species within the genus Ampelita include:

- Ampelita akoratsara Emberton, 1999
- Ampelita alluaudi (Dautzenberg, 1895)
- Ampelita ambanianae Emberton, 1999
- Ampelita amplaperta Fischer-Piette, C. P. Blanc, F. Blanc & Salvat, 1994
- Ampelita analamerae Emberton, 1999
- Ampelita andavakoerae Emberton & Rakotondrazafy, 2020
- Ampelita andriamamonjyi Griffiths & Herbert, 2013
- Ampelita anjajaviensis Emberton & Rakotondrazafy, 2020
- Ampelita anjanaharibei Emberton, 1999
- Ampelita anosiana Fischer-Piette, C. P. Blanc, F. Blanc & Salvat, 1994
- Ampelita atropos (Deshayes, 1840)
- Ampelita basizona Mousson, 1882
- Ampelita bathiei Fischer-Piette, 1952
- Ampelita battistinii Fischer-Piette & Garreau, 1965
- Ampelita beanka Griffiths & Herbert, 2013
- Ampelita bizonalis Odhner, 1919
- Ampelita caderyi Fischer-Piette, C.P. Blanc, F. Blanc & Salvat, 1994
- Ampelita caduca Fischer-Piette, F. Blanc & Salvat, 1975
- Ampelita calida Fischer-Piette, F. Blanc & Salvat, 1975
- Ampelita capdambrae Emberton & Rakotondrazafy, 2020
- Ampelita capuroni Fischer-Piette, F. Blanc & Salvat, 1975
- Ampelita celestinae Emberton & Rakotondrazafy, 2020
- Ampelita chlorozona (Grateloup, 1840)
- Ampelita clotho (Deshayes, 1850)
- Ampelita consanguinea (Deshayes, 1850)
- Ampelita covani (E. A. Smith, 1879)
- Ampelita crinieri Fischer-Piette, C. P. Blanc, F. Blanc & Salvat, 1994
- Ampelita culminans Fischer-Piette, 1952
- Ampelita decaryi Fischer-Piette, 1952
- Ampelita denisi Dautzenberg, 1928
- Ampelita dingeoni Fischer-Piette, F. Blanc & Salvat, 1975
- Ampelita duvalii (Petit de la Saussaye, 1844)
- Ampelita ela Emberton & Rakotondrazafy, 2020
- Ampelita fulgurata (G. B. Sowerby I, 1839)
- Ampelita funebris (Morelet, 1877)
- Ampelita futura Fischer-Piette & Garreau, 1965
- Ampelita galactostoma (L. Pfeiffer, 1849)
- Ampelita gaudens (Mabille, 1884)
- Ampelita globulus Fischer-Piette, F. Blanc & Vukadinovic, 1974
- Ampelita gonostyla (Ancey, 1882) (taxon inquirendum)
- Ampelita grandidieri Fischer-Piette, 1952
- Ampelita granulosa (Deshayes, 1850)
- Ampelita hova (Angas, 1877)
- Ampelita ivohibei Emberton, 1999
- Ampelita josephinae Emberton, 1999
- Ampelita katsaensis Fischer-Piette & Garreau, 1965
- Ampelita kendrae Emberton & Rakotondrazafy, 2020
- Ampelita kirae Emberton & Rakotondrazafy, 2020
- Ampelita lachesis (Deshayes, 1850)
- Ampelita lamarei (L. Pfeiffer, 1853)
- Ampelita lamothei (Dautzenberg, 1895)
- Ampelita lancula (Férussac, 1821)
- Ampelita lincolni Emberton & Rakotondrazafy, 2020
- Ampelita lindae Griffiths & Herbert, 2013
- Ampelita ludovici Fischer-Piette, C. P. Blanc, F. Blanc & Salvat, 1994
- Ampelita lurdoni Fischer-Piette, Blanc, C.P., Blanc, F. & Salvat, 1994
- Ampelita madagascariensis (Lamarck, 1816)
- Ampelita madecassina (Férussac, 1822)
- Ampelita marojeziana Fischer-Piette, C. P. Blanc, F. Blanc & Salvat, 1994
- Ampelita masoalae Emberton, 1999
- Ampelita michellae Emberton & Rakotondrazafy, 2020
- Ampelita milloti Fischer-Piette, 1952
- Ampelita miovaova Emberton & Rakotondrazafy, 2020
- Ampelita namerokoensis Fischer-Piette, 1952
- Ampelita neoglobulus Fischer-Piette, Blanc, C.P., Blanc, F. & Salvat, 1994
- Ampelita niarae Emberton & Rakotondrazafy, 2020
- Ampelita omphalodes (L. Pfeiffer, 1845)
- Ampelita owengriffithsi K. C. Emberton, Slapcinsky, Campbell, Rakotondrazafy, Andriamiarison & J. D. Emberton, 2010
- Ampelita parva Fischer-Piette & Garreau, 1965
- Ampelita perampla Dautzenberg, 1908
- Ampelita percyana (E. A. Smith, 1880)
- Ampelita petiti Fischer-Piette, 1952
- Ampelita pfeifferi Fischer-Piette, 1952
- Ampelita pilosa Fischer-Piette & Garreau, 1965
- Ampelita ranomafanae Emberton, 1999
- Ampelita raxworthyi Emberton, 1999
- Ampelita robillardi (H. Adams & Angas, 1876)
- Ampelita sepulcralis (Férussac, 1821)
- Ampelita soulaiana Fischer-Piette, Cauquoin & Testud, 1973
- Ampelita stephani Fischer-Piette, Cauquoin & Testud, 1973
- Ampelita stilpna (Mabille, 1884)
- Ampelita stumpffii (Kobelt, 1880)
- Ampelita suarezensis (Crosse & Fischer, 1877)
- Ampelita subatropos (Dautzenberg, 1895)
- Ampelita subsepulcralis (Crosse, 1868)
- Ampelita sylvatica Fischer-Piette & Garreau, 1965
- Ampelita thompsoni Emberton & Rakotondrazafy, 2020
- Ampelita unicolor (L. Pfeiffer, 1845)
- Ampelita vanoci Fischer-Piette, Blanc, C.P., Blanc, F. & Salvat, 1994
- Ampelita vesconis (Morelet, 1851)
- Ampelita watersi (Angas, 1877)
- Ampelita xystera (L. Pfeiffer, 1841)
- Ampelita zonata Fischer-Piette & Garreau, 1965

Synonyms

- Ampelita calypso (L. Pfeiffer, 1862): synonym of Ampelita basizona Mousson, 1882 (name based on junior primary homonym)
- Ampelita hemioxia Pilsbry, 1894: synonym of Ampelita xystera (L. Pfeiffer, 1841) (junior subjective synonym)
- Ampelita pauliana Fischer-Piette, 1952: synonym of Ampelita lamarei (L. Pfeiffer, 1853) (junior synonym)
- Ampelita shavi (E. A. Smith, 1879): synonym of Ampelita xystera (L. Pfeiffer, 1841)
- Ampelita sikorae Ancey, 1890: synonym of Ampelita xystera (L. Pfeiffer, 1841) (junior synonym)
- Ampelita subnigra Fulton, 1902: synonym of Ampelita omphalodes var. loucoubeensis (Crosse, 1881) (unaccepted > junior subjective synonym)
