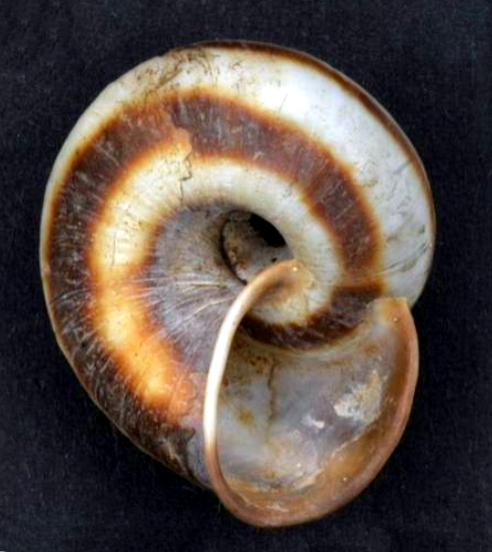
- Shell of Ampelita atropos (specimen at Naturalis Biodiversity Center)

Scientific classification
- Kingdom: Animalia
- Phylum: Mollusca
- Class: Gastropoda
- Order: Stylommatophora
- Family: Acavidae
- Genus: Ampelita
- Species: A. atropos

Binomial name
- Ampelita atropos (Deshayes, 1840)

Synonyms
- Helix atropos Deshayes, 1840 (original combination)

= Ampelita atropos =

Species of gastropod

Ampelita atropos is a species of tropical air-breathing land snail, a terrestrial pulmonate gastropod mollusk in the family Acavidae.

== Description ==
(Original description in French) The shell is orbicular, nearly discoid. Its spire is short and obtuse at the apex. It has five whorls, the first of which are whitish and barely convex; the last two are more rounded and widen quite rapidly.

The body whorl, especially, is proportionally larger than the others. It is somewhat flattened below, and this flattening forms an inclined plane that extends to the circumference of the umbilicus. This umbilicus is large, funnel-shaped, and its diameter is almost equal to that of the body whorl. The outer surface is smooth and exhibits only a few obsolete growth lines. The base of the last whorl, when examined with a magnifying glass, reveals a very large number of extremely fine, numerous, and closely spaced striae. The aperture is unique: it is positioned as a tangent to the penultimate whorl. It is oval-oblong, transverse, much wider than high. Its edge is formed by two very elongated and nearly parallel parts. One belongs to the upper side, and the other to the lower side; the middle portion is slightly sinuous, and forms a curvature corresponding to the circumference of the last whorl. The plane of this aperture forms an angle of 30 degrees with the longitudinal axis.

The specimen we have before us is a dark maroon brown; the interior of the umbilicus is the same color; the circumference of this part is circumscribed by a whitish zone. A second narrow zone appears a little below the circumference of the body whorl, and finally a third, narrower than the previous two, is placed below the suture and extends up towards the apex, dividing the surface of the first whorls into two equal parts.

== Distribution ==
This species is endemic to Madagascar.
