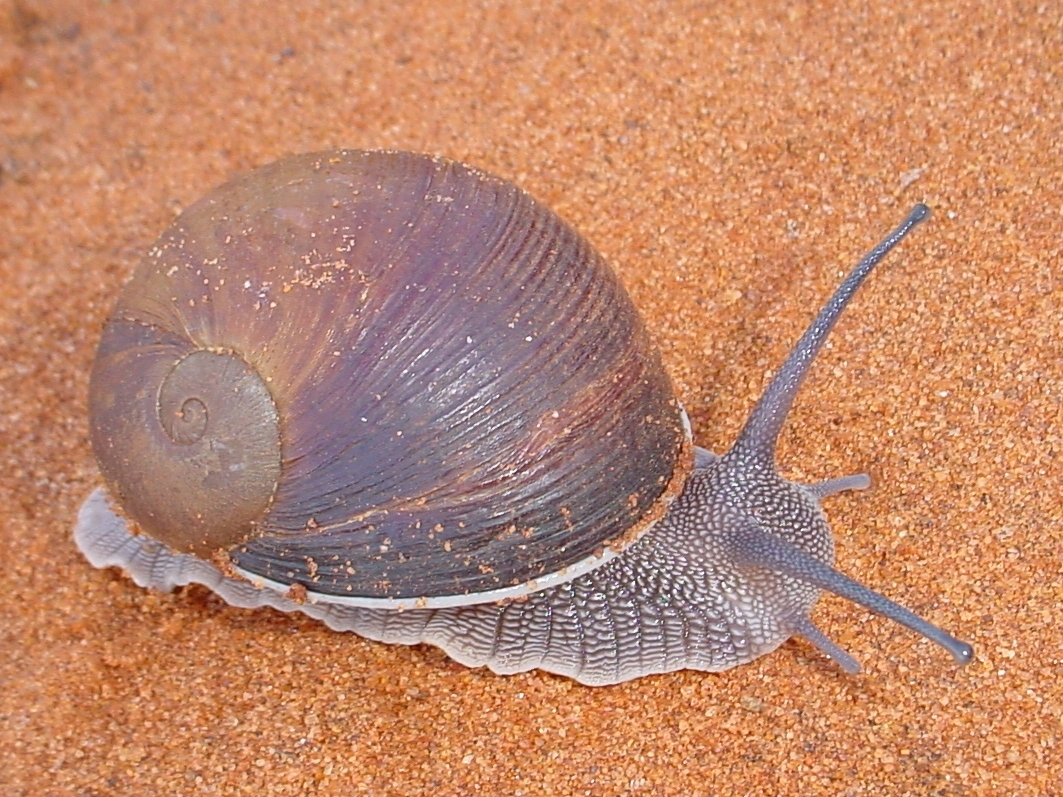
- A live individual of Helicophanta gloriosa

Scientific classification
- Kingdom: Animalia
- Phylum: Mollusca
- Class: Gastropoda
- Order: Stylommatophora
- Superfamily: Rhytidoidea
- Family: Acavidae; Pilsbry, 1895

Genera
- See text

= Acavidae =

Family of gastropods

Acavidae is a taxonomic family of air-breathing land snails, terrestrial pulmonate gastropod molluscs in the superfamily Rhytidoidea.

== Anatomy ==
In this family, the number of haploid chromosomes lies between 26 and 35 (according to the values in this table).

== Genera ==
The family Acavidae has no subfamilies.

Genera in the family Acavidae include:

- Acavus Montfort, 1810
- Ampelita Beck, 1837
- Embertoniphanta Groh & Poppe, 2002
- Eurystyla Ancey, 1887
- Helicophanta Férussac, 1821
- Oligospira Ancey, 1887
- † Pebasiconcha Wesselingh & Gittenberger, 1999 - with the only species † Pebasiconcha immanis Wesselingh & Gittenberger, 1999
- Reticulapex Emberton & Pearce, 2000
- Stylodonta De Cristofori & Jan, 1832

Genera brought into synonymy

- Acavella Jousseaume, 1894: synonym of Oligospira Ancey, 1887
- Columplica W. Hartmann, 1843: synonym of Stylodonta De Cristofori & Jan, 1832
- Poecilostylus Pilsbry, 1890: synonym of Eurystyla Ancey, 1887
- Stylodon H. Beck, 1837: synonym of Stylodonta De Cristofori & Jan, 1832
