= 2020 in paleomalacology =

This list 2020 in paleomalacology is a list of new taxa of ammonites and other fossil cephalopods, as well as fossil gastropods, bivalves and other molluscs that were described during the year 2020, as well as other significant discoveries and events related to molluscan paleontology that occurred in 2020.

== Ammonites ==
=== New taxa ===
Name	Novelty	Status	Authors	Age	Type locality	Country	Notes	Images
Acrimeroceras hoppeckense	Sp. nov	Valid	Korn & Buchwald in Korn et al.	Late Devonian		Germany		
Acrimeroceras ropicense	Sp. nov	Valid	Korn, Bartzsch & Weyer in Korn et al.	Late Devonian				
Acrimeroceras saalense	Sp. nov	Valid	Korn, Bartzsch & Weyer in Korn et al.	Late Devonian				
Acutimitoceras alabasense	Sp. nov	Valid	Nikolaeva	Devonian-Carboniferous boundary		Kazakhstan		
Acutimitoceras dzhanganense	Sp. nov	Valid	Nikolaeva	Devonian-Carboniferous boundary		Kazakhstan		
Almites hayasakai	Sp. nov	Valid	Ehiro & Ozawa	Permian (Asselian)	Taishaku Limestone	Japan		
Angolaites elegans	Sp. nov	Valid	Kennedy in Gale & Kennedy	Early Cretaceous (Albian)	Lower Duck Creek	United States (Texas)	A member of the family Brancoceratidae.	
Aspidoceras schweigertense	Sp. nov	Valid	Sarti	Late Jurassic (Tithonian)	Rosso Ammonitico Veronese Formation	Italy		
Aulacostephanus camericensis	Sp. nov	Valid	Cope & Etches	Late Jurassic (Kimmeridgian)		United Kingdom		
Baidites obesus	Sp. nov	Valid	Jattiot, Bucher & Brayard	Early Triassic		Indonesia		
Boesites biconcavus	Sp. nov	Valid	Ehiro & Ozawa	Permian (Asselian)	Taishaku Limestone	Japan		
Borissjakoceras falcatum	Sp. nov	Valid	Kennedy	Late Cretaceous (Cenomanian)		Tunisia	A member of the family Binneyitidae.	
?Bouleiceras betetensis	Sp. nov	Valid	Martínez & Joral	Early Jurassic (Toarcian)		Spain	A member of the family Hildoceratidae.	
Bouleiceras ibericum	Sp. nov	Valid	Martínez & Joral	Early Jurassic (Toarcian)		Spain	A member of the family Hildoceratidae.	
Cagliceras baldii	Sp. nov	Valid	Kovács, Dunai & Evanics	Early Jurassic (Toarcian)		Hungary	A member of the family Erycitidae.	
Cagliceras wegeneri	Sp. nov	Valid	Kovács, Dunai & Evanics	Early Jurassic (Toarcian)		Hungary	A member of the family Erycitidae.	
Carthaginites elegans	Sp. nov	Valid	Kennedy	Late Cretaceous (Cenomanian)		Algeria	A member of the family Turrilitidae.	
Churkites warei	Sp. nov	Valid	Jattiot, Bucher & Brayard	Early Triassic		Indonesia		
Collignoniceras badilleti	Sp. nov	Valid	Amédro & Châtelier in Amédro et al.	Late Cretaceous (Turonian)		France		
Collignoniceras hourqueigi	Sp. nov	Valid	Amédro & Châtelier in Amédro et al.	Late Cretaceous (Turonian)		France		
Collignoniceras vigennum	Sp. nov	Valid	Amédro & Châtelier in Amédro et al.	Late Cretaceous (Turonian)		France		
Conlinites evolutum	Sp. nov	Valid	Kennedy	Early Cretaceous (Albian)		Algeria	A member of the family Brancoceratidae.	
Coquandiceras	Gen. et comb. nov	Valid	Kennedy	Late Cretaceous (Cenomanian)		Algeria; Tunisia	A member of the family Acanthoceratidae belonging to the subfamily Mantelliceratinae. The type species is "Ammonites" jubae Coquand (1880); genus also includes "Ammonites" villei Coquand (1862).	
Cryptoturrilites	Gen. et sp. nov	Valid	Kennedy	Late Cretaceous (Cenomanian)		Tunisia	A member of the family Turrilitidae. The type species is C. tenuicostatus.	
Elobiceras (Craginites) simplex	Sp. nov	Valid	Kennedy in Gale & Kennedy	Early Cretaceous (Albian)	Lower Duck Creek	United States (Texas)	A member of the family Brancoceratidae.	
Elobiceras (Craginites) sparcicostatum	Sp. nov	Valid	Kennedy in Gale & Kennedy	Early Cretaceous (Albian)	Lower Duck Creek	United States (Texas)	A member of the family Brancoceratidae.	
Flemingites lidakensis	Sp. nov	Valid	Jattiot, Bucher & Brayard	Early Triassic		Indonesia		
Goniatites abaiensis	Sp. nov	Valid	Korn et al.	Carboniferous (Viséan)	Baktysai Formation	Kazakhstan		
Goniatites zhankurganensis	Sp. nov	Valid	Korn et al.	Carboniferous (Viséan)	Baktysai Formation	Kazakhstan		
Graysonites elegans	Sp. nov	Valid	Kennedy	Late Cretaceous (Cenomanian)		Algeria	A member of the family Acanthoceratidae.	
Gregoryceras boreale	Sp. nov	Valid	Mitta & Stupachenko	Late Jurassic (Oxfordian)		Russia	A member of the family Aspidoceratidae.	
Hoevelia megalomanica	Sp. nov	Valid	Korn, Hairapetian & Gholamalian	Late Devonian		Iran		
Homeomorphites	Gen. et sp. et comb. nov	Valid	Bert, Bersac & Canut	Early Cretaceous (Hauterivian to Barremian)		Argentina; Chile	A member of the family Neocomitidae. The type species is H. aguirreurretae; genus also includes H. ploszkiewiczi (Riccardi and Aguirre-Urreta, 1989) and H. varicostatus (Riccardi and Aguirre-Urreta, 1989). Announced in 2019; the final version of the article naming was published in 2020.	
Homoceratoides wangchengi	Sp. nov	Valid	Korn & Wang in Korn et al.	Carboniferous (Bashkirian)	Jingyuan Formation	China	A member of the family Bisatoceratidae. Announced in 2020; the final version of the article naming was published in 2021.	
Hoploscaphites peterseni	Sp. nov	Valid	Landman et al.	Late Cretaceous	Bearpaw Shale; Pierre Shale	United States (Montana; Wyoming)		
Howarthiceras	Gen. et comb. nov	Valid	Zakharov & Rogov	Upper Jurassic (Tithonian)		United States (California)	A new genus for "Groebericeras" baylei Imlay & Jones.	
Hybonoticeras pseudoharpephorum	Sp. nov	Valid	Sarti	Late Jurassic (Tithonian)	Rosso Ammonitico Veronese Formation	Italy		
Hypowaagenia	Gen. et sp. nov	Valid	Schweigert & Schlampp	Late Jurassic (Kimmeridgian)	Arzberg Formation	Germany; Pakistan?	A member of the family Aspidoceratidae. The type species is H. endressi; genus might also include "Aspidoceras" acanthomphalum Zittel (1870).	
Kosmoclymenia ebbighauseni	Sp. nov	Valid	Korn	Devonian (Famennian)		Morocco		
Lasswitzia	Gen. et comb. nov	Valid	Kennedy in Gale & Kennedy	Early Cretaceous (Albian)	Lower Duck Creek Formation	United States (Texas)	A member of the family Brancoceratidae. The type species is "Schloenbachia austinensis" Roemer var. minima Lasswitz (1904) (raised to the rank of a separate species Lasswitzia minima).	
Lenicostites	Gen. et comb. nov	Valid	Bert, Bersac & Canut	Early Cretaceous (Barremian)		France	A member of Ancyloceratoidea belonging to the new family Lenicostitidae. The type species is "Hemihoplites" rusticus Vermeulen (1996). Announced in 2019; the final version of the article naming was published in 2020.	
Lithacoceras főzyi	Sp. nov	Valid	Sarti	Late Jurassic (Tithonian)	Rosso Ammonitico Veronese Formation	Italy		
Litophragmatoceras curiosus	Sp. nov	Valid	Kennedy	Late Cretaceous (Cenomanian)		Algeria	A member of the family Flickiidae.	
Lytoceras pseudorsinii	Sp. nov	Valid	Sarti	Late Jurassic (Tithonian)	Rosso Ammonitico Veronese Formation	Italy		
Marcouxia chaiburiensis	Sp. nov	Valid	Tongtherm et al.	Early Triassic	Chaiburi	Thailand		
Margoceras	Gen. et sp. nov	Valid	Borissenkov	Permian (Cisuralian)		Russia (Nenets Autonomous Okrug)	A member of the family Paragastrioceratidae. Genus includes new species M. boreale.	
Mittaites	Gen. et comb. nov	Valid	Frau et al.	Early Cretaceous (Berriasian)		Russia	The type species is "Mazenoticeras" ceccai. Announced in 2020; the final version of the article naming it was published in 2021.	
Mortoniceratoides elegans	Sp. nov	Valid	Kennedy in Gale & Kennedy	Early Cretaceous (Albian)	Kiamichi	United States (Texas)	A member of the family Brancoceratidae.	
Muessenbiaergia bockwinkeli	Sp. nov	Valid	Korn	Devonian (Famennian)		Morocco	A member of the family Kosmoclymeniidae.	
Neophlycticeras algeriense	Sp. nov	Valid	Kennedy	Late Cretaceous (Cenomanian)		Algeria	A member of the family Lyelliceratidae.	
Neophyllites lavernockensis	Sp. nov	Valid	Hodges	Early Jurassic (Hettangian)	White Lias Formation	United Kingdom	Announced in 2020; the final version of the article naming it was published in 2021.	
Neotelodactylites	Gen. et comb. nov	Valid	Jattiot, Gris & Trincal	Early Jurassic (Toarcian)		France; Italy	A new genus for "Peronoceras" eucosmum Lippi Boncambi (1947).	
Neouddenites echiensis	Sp. nov	Valid	Kutygin	Permian		Russia (Sakha)	A member of the family Medlicottiidae.	
Paracraginites	Gen. et sp. nov	Valid	Kennedy in Gale & Kennedy	Early Cretaceous (Albian)	Lower Duck Creek	United States (Texas)	A member of the family Brancoceratidae. The type species is P. conlini.	
Paracrioceras giraudae	Sp. nov	Valid	Vermeulen et al.	Early Cretaceous		France		
Paragastrioceras cantabrignianum	Sp. nov	Valid	Borissenkov	Permian (Cisuralian)		Russia (Nenets Autonomous Okrug)	A member of the family Paragastrioceratidae.	
Paraspidites bicarinatus	Sp. nov	Valid	Jattiot, Bucher & Brayard	Early Triassic		Indonesia		
Paratornoceras ayense	Sp. nov	Valid	Korn & Buchwald in Korn et al.	Late Devonian				
Paratornoceras harounense	Sp. nov	Valid	Korn & Ebbighausen in Korn et al.	Late Devonian				
Paratornoceras peterseni	Sp. nov	Valid	Korn & Buchwald in Korn et al.	Late Devonian				
Paratornoceras thuringense	Sp. nov	Valid	Korn, Bartzsch & Weyer in Korn et al.	Late Devonian				
Pernaceras leroyi	Sp. nov	Valid	Vermeulen et al.	Early Cretaceous		France		
Pervinquieria (Deiradoceras) serpentiforme	Sp. nov	Valid	Kennedy in Gale & Kennedy	Early Cretaceous (Albian)	Lower Duck Creek	United States (Texas)	A member of the family Brancoceratidae.	
Pervinquieria (Pervinquieria) asper	Sp. nov	Valid	Kennedy in Gale & Kennedy	Early Cretaceous (Albian)	Lower Duck Creek	United States (Texas)	A member of the family Brancoceratidae.	
Procrioceratites	Gen. et sp. et comb. nov	Valid	Vermeulen et al.	Early Cretaceous		France	A member of the family Crioceratitidae. The type species is P. etiennei; genus also includes P. primitivus (Reboulet, 1996) and P. barrabei (Sarkar, 1955).	
Protacanthoceras sottaraense	Sp. nov	Valid	Kennedy	Late Cretaceous (Cenomanian)		Algeria	A member of the family Acanthoceratidae.	
Protacanthodiscus guerrai	Sp. nov	Valid	Sarti	Late Jurassic (Tithonian)	Rosso Ammonitico Veronese Formation	Italy		
Prouddenites evolutus	Sp. nov	Valid	Kutygin	Permian		Russia (Sakha)	A member of the family Medlicottiidae.	
Pseudodiscosphinctes pseudorhodanicus	Sp. nov	Valid	Caracuel & Sarti in Sarti	Late Jurassic (Tithonian)	Rosso Ammonitico Veronese Formation	Italy		
Pseudolissoceras atesinum	Sp. nov	Valid	Sarti	Late Jurassic (Tithonian)	Rosso Ammonitico Veronese Formation	Italy		
Pseudolongaeviceras	Gen. et sp. nov	Valid	Alifirov & Knyazev	Middle Jurassic (Callovian)		Russia	A member of the family Cardioceratidae. Genus includes new species P. densicostatum.	
Pseudoxybeloceras simplex	Sp. nov	Valid	Kennedy	Late Cretaceous		United Kingdom		
Ptychites embreei	Sp. nov	Valid	Bischof & Lehmann	Middle Triassic (Anisian)	Favret Formation	United States (Nevada)		
Reymenticoceras ornatum	Sp. nov	Valid	Kennedy	Late Cretaceous (Turonian)		Colombia	A member of the family Acanthoceratidae belonging to the subfamily Mammitinae. Announced in 2020; the final version of the article naming it was published in 2021.	
Romaniceras (Romaniceras) marigniacum	Sp. nov	Valid	Amédro & Châtelier in Amédro et al.	Late Cretaceous (Turonian)		France		
Roopnarinites	Gen. et comb. nov	Valid	Jattiot, Bucher & Brayard	Early Triassic		Indonesia	Genus includes "Meekoceras" paucesculptatum Welter (1922).	
Scaphites occlusus	Sp. nov	Valid	Kennedy	Late Cretaceous (Cenomanian)		Algeria; Tunisia	A member of the family Scaphitidae.	
Schaireria (Schaireria) vetera	Sp. nov	Valid	Sarti	Late Jurassic (Tithonian)	Rosso Ammonitico Veronese Formation	Italy		
Shumardites umbilicatus	Sp. nov	Valid	Ehiro & Ozawa	Permian (Asselian)	Taishaku Limestone	Japan		
Sormaites	Gen. et sp. nov	Valid	Muramiya & Shigeta	Late Cretaceous (Turonian)		Japan	A member of the family Diplomoceratidae. Genus includes new species S. teshioensis.	
Stoliczkaia (Stoliczkaia) djerissaensis	Sp. nov	Valid	Kennedy	Early Cretaceous (Albian)		Tunisia	A member of the family Lyelliceratidae.	
Subflemingites bihatiense	Sp. nov	Valid	Jattiot, Bucher & Brayard	Early Triassic		Indonesia		
Tescheniceras	Gen. et comb. nov	Valid	Vašíček	Early Cretaceous (Valanginian to Hauterivian)		Austria; France; Italy; Morocco; Romania; Serbia; Slovakia; Spain; Switzerland	A member of the family Neocomitidae. The type species is "Neocomites (Teschenites)" flucticulus Thieuloy (1977); genus also includes "Neocomites (Teschenites)" callidiscus Thieuloy (1971), "Teschenites" subflucticulus Reboulet (1996), "Neocomites (Teschenites)" pachydicranus Thieuloy (1977) and "Teschenites" subpachydicranus Reboulet (1996).	
Tumaroceras paveli	Sp. nov	Valid	Borissenkov	Permian (Cisuralian)		Russia (Nenets Autonomous Okrug)	A member of the family Paragastrioceratidae.	
Vidrioceras ellipticum	Sp. nov	Valid	Ehiro & Ozawa	Permian (Asselian)	Taishaku Limestone	Japan		
Virgatosimoceras propecostatum	Sp. nov	Valid	Sarti	Late Jurassic (Tithonian)	Rosso Ammonitico Veronese Formation	Italy		
Yezoceras elegans	Sp. nov	Valid	Aiba, Karasawa & Iwasaki	Late Cretaceous (Coniacian)		Japan	A member of the family Nostoceratidae.	

=== General research ===
- A study aiming to determine the drag force experienced by a wide range of ammonite shell shapes is published by Hebdon, Ritterbush & Choi (2020).
- A study evaluating how different parameters affected the ammonite shell's response to water pressure, aiming to determine whether the ammonite septa strengthened the shell against pressure at increasing water depths, is published by Lemanis (2020).
- A study on global patterns of ammonite diversification and extinction from the Early Devonian (Emsian) to the Early Triassic (Induan) is published by Whalen, Hull & Briggs (2020).
- A study on the abundance and size distribution of small specimens of Baculites and Hoploscaphites at eight cold methane seep sites in the Upper Cretaceous Pierre Shale (South Dakota, United States) is published by Rowe et al. (2020), who interpret their findings as indicating that newly hatched ammonites lived in close proximity to seep fluids emerging at the sediment-water interface and the associated microbial food web.
- A study on changes of hydrostatic properties of three species of Didymoceras during their ontogeny is published by Peterman et al. (2020).

== Other cephalopods ==
=== New taxa ===
Name	Novelty	Status	Authors	Age	Type locality	Country	Notes	Images
Alexoceras	Gen. et sp. nov	Valid	Leonova & Shchedukhin	Early Permian		Russia (Bashkortostan)	A nautiloid related to Temnocheilus. Genus includes new species A. mazaevi.	
Ancistroceras ristnensis	Sp. nov	Valid	Aubrechtová & Meidla	Ordovician		Estonia		
Ancistroceras vahikuelaensis	Sp. nov	Valid	Aubrechtová & Meidla	Ordovician		Estonia		
Bairstowius amaliae	Sp. nov	Valid	Rita et al.	Early Jurassic (Pliensbachian)	Lemede	Portugal	A belemnite belonging to the family Hastitidae.	
Barskoceras	Gen. et sp. nov	Valid	Leonova & Shchedukhin	Early Permian		Russia (Bashkortostan)	A probable member of Oncocerida. Genus includes new species B. mirum.	
Chromatoceras	Gen. et comb. nov	Valid	Turek & Manda	Silurian (Pridoli)	Kopanina	Czech Republic	A member of Oncocerida belonging to the family Oonoceratidae. The type species is "Cyrtoceras" veteranum Barrande (1866); genus also includes "Cyrtoceras" constringens Barrande (1866).	
Domatoceras bashkiricum	Sp. nov	Valid	Leonova & Shchedukhin	Early Permian		Russia (Bashkortostan)		
Domatoceras sterlitamakense	Sp. nov	Valid	Leonova & Shchedukhin	Early Permian		Russia (Bashkortostan)		
Enigmabelus	Gen. et 3 sp. nov	Valid	Keupp & Fuchs	Early Jurassic (Pliensbachian)	Amaltheenton	Germany	A member of Belemnitina. Genus includes new species E. doppelsteini, E. micros and possibly ? E. leptos.	
Houdongoceras	Gen. et sp. nov	Valid	Yang et al.	Permian Guadalupian	Gufeng Formation	China	A member of Orthocerida. Genus includes new species H. chaohuensis. Announced in 2020; the final version of the article naming it was published in 2021.	
Leniceras	Gen. et sp. nov	Valid	Leonova & Shchedukhin	Early Permian		Russia (Bashkortostan)	A nautiloid belonging to the family Liroceratidae. Genus includes new species L. ovale.	
Liroceras shakhtauense	Sp. nov	Valid	Leonova & Shchedukhin	Early Permian		Russia (Bashkortostan)	A nautiloid belonging to the family Liroceratidae.	
Lituites nehatuensis	Sp. nov	Valid	Aubrechtová & Meidla	Ordovician		Estonia		
Megaglossoceras barskovi	Sp. nov	Valid	Leonova & Shchedukhin	Early Permian		Russia (Bashkortostan)	A nautiloid belonging to the family Ephippioceratidae.	
Mosquoceras planum	Sp. nov	Valid	Leonova & Shchedukhin	Early Permian		Russia (Bashkortostan)		
Shatoceras	Gen. et sp. nov	Valid	Leonova & Shchedukhin	Early Permian		Russia (Bashkortostan)	A nautiloid related to Domatoceras. Genus includes new species S. umbilicatum.	
Shikhanonautilus	Gen. et sp. nov	Valid	Leonova & Shchedukhin	Early Permian		Russia (Bashkortostan)	A nautiloid belonging to the family Liroceratidae. Genus includes new species S. siphonoventralis.	
Sholakoceras formosum	Sp. nov	Valid	Leonova & Shchedukhin	Early Permian		Russia (Bashkortostan)		
Thyoceras	Gen. et sp. nov	Valid	Leonova & Shchedukhin	Early Permian		Russia (Bashkortostan)	A nautiloid related to Permonautilus. Genus includes new species T. involutum.	
Trematoceras watanabei	Sp. nov	Valid	Niko & Ehiro	Middle Triassic (Anisian)	Fukkoshi Formation	Japan		

=== General research ===
- A study aiming to determine whether the development of chamber volume in fossil cephalopod phragmocones conveys information about their physiology is published by Tajika et al. (2020), who evaluate the implications of their findings for the knowledge of the ecology and extinction selectivity of fossil cephalopods.
- A study on the spatial distribution of Givetian oncocerid fossils from the Hamar Laghdad ridge (eastern Anti-Atlas, Morocco), evaluating its implications for the knowledge of the life cycle of these cephalopods, is published by Pohle et al. (2020).
- Jurassic nautiloid Somalinautilus antiquus, previously known only from the Kimmeridgian strata of Ethiopia, is reported from the Kimmeridgian of Southern Germany by Schweigert (2020), who also reports the first finding of the species Somalinautilus clavifer the Middle Jurassic (Bathonian) of Southern Germany.
- A study on the reproductive strategies of fossil coleoids, based on data from shells of belemnoids, spirulids and sepiids, is published by Fuchs et al. (2020).
- A specimen of Plesioteuthis preserved with an associated tooth of a pterosaur is reported from the Upper Jurassic Altmühltal Formation (Germany) by Hoffmann et al. (2020), who evaluate the implications of this finding for the knowledge of the likely habitat of Plesioteuthis.

== Gastropods ==
=== New taxa ===
Name	Novelty	Status	Authors	Age	Type locality	Country	Notes	Images
Acanthinula karsdorfensis	Sp. nov	Valid	Kadolsky	Early Eocene		Germany	A species of Acanthinula sensu lato.	
Acroloxus aspis	Sp. nov	Valid	Kadolsky	Early Eocene		Germany	A species of Acroloxus.	
Acroloxus korys	Sp. nov	Valid	Kadolsky	Early Eocene		Germany	A species of Acroloxus.	
"Acteon" distinctus	Sp. nov	Valid	Landau, Ceulemans & Van Dingenen	Miocene (Tortonian)		France		
Afrodontops	Gen. et 2 sp. nov	Valid	Kadolsky	Early Eocene		Germany	A member of the family Charopidae. The type species is A. europaea; genus also includes A. comes.	
Alanstukella	Gen. et comb. nov	Valid	Mazaev	Carboniferous (Kasimovian) to Permian (Sakmarian)		Russia	A member of the family Trochonematidae. The type species is A. rossica (Stuckenberg, 1905).	
Albinulopsis	Gen. et sp. et comb. nov	Valid	Kadolsky	Eocene		France; Germany	A member of the family Gastrocoptidae. The type species is A. gibba; genus also includes "Pupa" bonneti Cossmann (1907).	
Altotomaria	Gen. et sp. nov	Valid	Ketwetsuriya et al.	Permian (Roadian)	Khao Khad Formation	Thailand	Genus includes new species A. reticulata.	
Ammonicera oliveri	Sp. nov	Valid	Landau, Ceulemans & Van Dingenen	Miocene (Tortonian)		France	A species of Ammonicera.	
Andonia delgadoi	Sp. nov	Valid	Landau, Van Dingenen & Ceulemans	Miocene (Tortonian)		France		
Andonia wilhelminamariae	Sp. nov	Valid	Landau & Mulder	Pliocene		Italy; Spain		
Anomphalus murankaensis	Sp. nov	Valid	Mazaev	Permian (Sakmarian)		Russia		
Apachella noinskyi	Sp. nov	Valid	Mazaev	Permian (Sakmarian)		Russia		
Apachella thailandensis	Sp. nov	Valid	Ketwetsuriya et al.	Permian (Roadian)	Khao Khad Formation	Thailand		
Aphanitoma roesti	Sp. nov	Valid	Landau, Van Dingenen & Ceulemans	Miocene (Tortonian)		France	A species of Aphanitoma.	
Aquitanobursa javana	Sp. nov	Valid	Landau et al.	Miocene		Indonesia	A member of the family Bursidae.	
Assiminea striatura	Sp. nov	Valid	Bullis et al.	Late Cretaceous (Cenomanian)	Burmese amber	Myanmar	A species of Assiminea.	
Auristomia insulsa	Sp. nov	Valid	Landau et al.	Miocene (Tortonian)		France	A species of Auristomia.	
Bactrocythara pascaleae	Sp. nov	Valid	Landau, Van Dingenen & Ceulemans	Miocene (Tortonian)		France	A species of Bactrocythara.	
Balticopta	Gen. et sp. nov	Valid	Balashov & Perkovsky	Eocene (Priabonian)	Baltic amber	Russia (Kaliningrad Oblast)	A member of the family Gastrocoptidae. The type species is B. gusakovi.	
Bania goehlichae	Sp. nov	Valid	Mandic, Harzhauser & Neubauer	Middle Miocene		Bosnia and Herzegovina		
Bela henkmulderi	Sp. nov	Valid	Landau, Van Dingenen & Ceulemans	Miocene (Tortonian)		France	A species of Bela.	
Bela keukelaari	Sp. nov	Valid	Landau, Van Dingenen & Ceulemans	Miocene (Tortonian)		France	A species of Bela.	
Bela pseudomegastoma	Sp. nov	Valid	Landau, Van Dingenen & Ceulemans	Miocene (Tortonian)		France	A species of Bela.	
Bela pseudovulpecula	Sp. nov	Valid	Landau, Van Dingenen & Ceulemans	Miocene (Tortonian)		France	A species of Bela.	
Bela redoniana	Sp. nov	Valid	Landau, Van Dingenen & Ceulemans	Miocene (Tortonian)		France	A species of Bela.	
Bela scarponii	Sp. nov	Valid	Landau, Van Dingenen & Ceulemans	Miocene (Tortonian)		France	A species of Bela.	
Bela sceauxensis	Sp. nov	Valid	Landau, Van Dingenen & Ceulemans	Miocene (Tortonian)		France	A species of Bela.	
Belgrandiella? nichterli	Sp. nov	Valid	Harzhauser et al.	Late Eocene		Spain	Possibly a species of Belgrandiella.	
Bellerophon erawanensis	Sp. nov	Valid	Ketwetsuriya et al.	Permian (Roadian)	Khao Khad Formation	Thailand		
Biarmeaspira mazaevi	Sp. nov	Valid	Ketwetsuriya et al.	Permian (Roadian)	Khao Khad Formation	Thailand		
Buccinaria minuscula	Sp. nov	Valid	Landau, Van Dingenen & Ceulemans	Miocene (Tortonian)		France	A species of Buccinaria.	
Calculocochlea	Gen. et sp. nov	Valid	Juárez-Ruiz, Matamales-Andreu & Kadolsky	Early Oligocene		Spain	A member of the family Vidaliellidae. Genus includes new species C. oliveri.	
Callitrochilia	Gen. et comb. nov	Valid	Gain, Belliard & Le Renard	Eocene		France	A member of the family Calliostomatidae. The type species is "Calliostoma (Eutrochus)" ditropis Cossmann & Pissarro (1902).	
Calogoniodiscus pyrenaicus	Sp. nov	Valid	Harzhauser et al.	Late Eocene		Spain		
Campanile madagasikara	Sp. nov		Pacaud	Late Miocene		Madagascar	A species of Campanile.	
Careliopsis gallica	Sp. nov	Valid	Landau et al.	Miocene (Tortonian)		France	A species of Careliopsis.	
Carychiopsina	Gen. et comb. nov	Valid	Kadolsky	Late Oligocene and early Miocene		Czech Republic; Poland	A member of the family Ellobiidae belonging to the subfamily Carychiinae. The type species is "Pupa" schwageri Reuss (1868); genus also includes C. costulata (Sandberger, 1862), C. prisyazhnyuki (Stworzewicz, 1999) and possibly C.? surai (Stworzewicz, 1999).	
Carychium bachi	Sp. nov	Valid	Kadolsky	Early Eocene		Germany	A species of Carychium.	
Carychium vagum	Sp. nov	Valid	Kadolsky	Early Eocene		Germany	A species of Carychium.	
Casmaria primitiva	Sp. nov	Valid	Landau et al.	Miocene		Indonesia	A species of Casmaria.	
Cassis robusta	Sp. nov	Valid	Landau et al.	Miocene		Indonesia	A species of Cassis.	
Cassitriton	Gen. et sp. nov	Valid	Craig & Tracey in Craig et al.	Eocene (Lutetian)		France	A member of the family Cymatiidae. The type species is C. magnificus Craig, Tracey & Gain.	
Cataegis ramosi	Sp. nov	Valid	Kiel, Aguilar & Kase	Late Pliocene	Bata Formation	Philippines	A species of Cataegis.	
Cheilospicata cedrus	Sp. nov	Valid	Garvie in Garvie, Goedert & Janssen			United States		
Chemnitzia miogallica	Sp. nov	Valid	Landau et al.	Miocene (Tortonian)		France	A species of Chemnitzia.	
Chemnitzia robusticostata	Sp. nov	Valid	Landau et al.	Miocene (Tortonian)		France	A species of Chemnitzia.	
Chilodonta tricostatula	Sp. nov	Valid	Gründel, Hostettler & Gfeller	Late Jurassic (Oxfordian)	St-Ursanne-Formation	Switzerland	A species of Chilodonta.	
Clanculus (Clanculopsis) krachi	Sp. nov	Valid	Nosowska	Middle Miocene		Poland; Ukraine	A species of Clanculus.	
Clathrella semilaeve	Sp. nov	Valid	Landau et al.	Miocene (Tortonian)		France		
Clathromangelia daisyae	Sp. nov	Valid	Landau, Van Dingenen & Ceulemans	Miocene (Tortonian)		France	A species of Clathromangelia.	
Clathromangelia densecostata	Sp. nov	Valid	Landau, Van Dingenen & Ceulemans	Miocene (Tortonian)		France	A species of Clathromangelia.	
Clathromangelia hakkennesi	Sp. nov	Valid	Landau, Van Dingenen & Ceulemans	Miocene (Tortonian)		France	A species of Clathromangelia.	
Clathromangelia helwerdae	Sp. nov	Valid	Landau, Van Dingenen & Ceulemans	Miocene (Tortonian)		France	A species of Clathromangelia.	
Clathromangelia karinneae	Sp. nov	Valid	Landau, Van Dingenen & Ceulemans	Miocene (Tortonian)		France	A species of Clathromangelia.	
Clathromangelia pereirae	Sp. nov	Valid	Landau, Van Dingenen & Ceulemans	Miocene (Tortonian)		France	A species of Clathromangelia.	
Clathromangelia vannieulandei	Sp. nov	Valid	Landau, Van Dingenen & Ceulemans	Miocene (Tortonian)		France	A species of Clathromangelia.	
Clathromangelia wopkeae	Sp. nov	Valid	Landau, Van Dingenen & Ceulemans	Miocene (Tortonian)		France	A species of Clathromangelia.	
Clavatula sceauxensis	Sp. nov	Valid	Landau, Van Dingenen & Ceulemans	Miocene (Tortonian)		France	A species of Clavatula.	
Clio gailae	Sp. nov	Valid	Goedert & Janssen in Garvie, Goedert & Janssen			United States (Washington)	A species of Clio.	
Cochleochilus? spiralocostatus	Sp. nov	Valid	Gründel, Hostettler & Gfeller	Late Jurassic (Oxfordian)	St-Ursanne-Formation	Switzerland	Possibly a member of the family Ataphridae.	
Coenaculum boucheti	Sp. nov	Valid	Landau, Ceulemans & Van Dingenen	Miocene (Tortonian)		France	A species of Coenaculum.	
Cryptochorda altavesna	Sp. nov	Valid	Pacaud & Sautereau	Eocene (Lutetian)		France	A member of the family Harpidae.	
Cryptochorda cosediensis	Sp. nov	Valid	Pacaud & Sautereau	Eocene (Lutetian))		France	A member of the family Harpidae.	
Cryptochorda neptis	Sp. nov	Valid	Pacaud & Sautereau	Eocene (Ypresian))		France	A member of the family Harpidae.	
Currylimacina asperita	Sp. nov	Valid	Garvie in Garvie, Goedert & Janssen			United States		
Cypraecassis minirufa	Sp. nov	Valid	Landau et al.	Miocene		Indonesia	A species of Cypraecassis.	
Cyrillia michalidesi	Sp. nov	Valid	Landau, Van Dingenen & Ceulemans	Miocene (Tortonian)		France	A species of Cyrillia.	
Daphnella groeneveldi	Sp. nov	Valid	Landau, Van Dingenen & Ceulemans	Miocene (Tortonian)		France	A species of Daphnella.	
Donaldina sakmaraensis	Sp. nov	Valid	Mazaev	Permian (Sakmarian)		Russia		
Ebala ornatissima	Sp. nov	Valid	Landau, Ceulemans & Van Dingenen	Miocene (Tortonian)		France	A species of Ebala.	
Emarginula rara	Sp. nov	Valid	Gründel, Hostettler & Gfeller	Late Jurassic (Oxfordian)	St-Ursanne-Formation	Switzerland	A species of Emarginula.	
Enneopupa priabonica	Sp. nov	Valid	Harzhauser et al.	Late Eocene		Spain		
Eoconus cambieni	Sp. nov	Valid	Landau, Van Dingenen & Ceulemans	Miocene (Tortonian)		France		
Eoconus vanhoutenae	Sp. nov	Valid	Landau, Van Dingenen & Ceulemans	Miocene (Tortonian)		France		
Eofavartia dharmai	Sp. nov	Valid	Merle & Landau	Middle Miocene		Indonesia	A member of the family Muricidae.	
Eohispania	Gen. et sp. nov	Valid	Harzhauser et al.	Late Eocene		Spain	Genus includes new species E. dominicii.	
Eotrichophorus	Gen. et sp. nov	Valid	Bullis et al.	Late Cretaceous (Cenomanian)	Burmese amber	Myanmar	A member of the family Cyclophoridae. Genus includes new species E. kachin.	
Erato crassus	Sp. nov	Valid	Fehse	Miocene		France	A species of Erato.	
Erato fragilis	Sp. nov	Valid	Fehse	Miocene		France	A species of Erato.	
Erato pinguis	Sp. nov	Valid	Fehse	Miocene		France	A species of Erato.	
Erato princeps	Sp. nov	Valid	Fehse	Miocene		France	A species of Erato.	
Erato prokimakowiczi	Sp. nov	Valid	Fehse	Miocene		France	A species of Erato.	
Erato quasiplanulosa	Sp. nov	Valid	Fehse	Miocene		France	A species of Erato.	
Erato tenuipustulata	Sp. nov	Valid	Fehse	Miocene		France	A species of Erato.	
Eulimella redoniana	Sp. nov	Valid	Landau et al.	Miocene (Tortonian)		France	A species of Eulimella.	
Eulimella semilaeve	Sp. nov	Valid	Landau et al.	Miocene (Tortonian)		France	A species of Eulimella.	
Eusassia	Gen. et comb. nov	Valid	Craig & Tracey in Craig et al.	Eocene		France	A member of the family Cymatiidae. The type species is "Triton (Lampusia)" chalmasi Vasseur (1882); genus also includes "Eutritonium (Sassia)" dubusi Cossmann & Pissarro (1905).	
Euthema annae	Sp. nov	In press	Balashov	Late Cretaceous (Cenomanian)	Burmese amber	Myanmar	A species of Euthema.	
Euthema truncatellina	Sp. nov	Valid	Balashov, Perkovsky & Vasilenko	Late Cretaceous (Cenomanian)	Burmese amber	Myanmar	A species of Euthema.	
Euthriofusus postumus	Sp. nov	Valid	Landau & Mulder	Pliocene		Spain		
Freboldia carinii	Sp. nov	Valid	Pieroni & Nützel	Middle Triassic	Esino Limestone	Italy		
Fusulculus hanseni	Nom. nov	Valid	Pacaud	Early Paleocene		Denmark	A species of Fusulculus; a replacement name for Epalxis ? rosenkrantzi Hansen (2019).	
Gosseletina microstriata	Sp. nov	Valid	Ketwetsuriya et al.	Permian (Roadian)	Khao Khad Formation	Thailand	A member of the family Gosseletinidae. Originally described as a species of Gosseletina; Mazaev (2021) transferred it to the genus Nemaspira.	
Haedropleura brebioni	Sp. nov	Valid	Landau, Van Dingenen & Ceulemans	Miocene (Tortonian)		France	A species of Haedropleura.	
Haedropleura gallica	Sp. nov	Valid	Landau, Van Dingenen & Ceulemans	Miocene (Tortonian)		France	A species of Haedropleura.	
Haedropleura ligeriana	Sp. nov	Valid	Landau, Van Dingenen & Ceulemans	Miocene (Tortonian)		France	A species of Haedropleura.	
Headonia	Gen. et comb. nov	Valid	Harzhauser et al.	Late Eocene	Headon Hill Formation	France; United Kingdom	The type species is "Planorbis" euomphalus Sowerby (1816)	
Heliconoides hodgkinsoni	Sp. nov	Valid	Garvie in Garvie, Goedert & Janssen			United States		
Helvetataphrus	Gen. et comb. nov	Valid	Gründel, Hostettler & Gfeller	Late Jurassic (Oxfordian)	St-Ursanne-Formation	France; Switzerland	A member of the family Ataphridae. The type species is "Turbo" subrugosus Buvignier (1852).	
Heterogen praelongispira	Sp. nov	Valid	Matsuoka & Hirano	Pleistocene	Katata Formation	Japan	A species of Heterogen.	
Heterosubulites longusapertura	Sp. nov	Valid	Ketwetsuriya et al.	Permian (Roadian)	Khao Khad Formation	Thailand		
Incisilabium trochiformis	Sp. nov	Valid	Lozouet, Cahuzac & Charles	Eocene (Priabonian)		France	A member of the family Modulidae.	
Ividella tuberculata	Sp. nov	Valid	Landau et al.	Miocene (Tortonian)		France	A member of the family Pyramidellidae. Originally described as a species of Ividella, but subsequently transferred to the genus Mulderia.	
Katosira ? bicarinata	Sp. nov	Valid	Ferrari, Little & Atkinson	Early Jurassic (Toarcian)	Blea Wyke Sandstone Formation	United Kingdom	A member of the family Zygopleuridae.	
Klavlia minuta	Sp. nov	Valid	Mazaev	Permian (Sakmarian)		Russia		
Laminifera nannodes	Sp. nov	Valid	Harzhauser et al.	Late Eocene		Spain		
Laxecostula	Gen. et comb. nov	Valid	Harzhauser et al.	Eocene (Lutetian)	Bouxwiller Formation	France	Genus includes "Helix" laxecostulata Sandberger (1871).	
Leufroyia annegienae	Sp. nov	Valid	Landau, Van Dingenen & Ceulemans	Miocene (Tortonian)		France	A species of Leufroyia.	
Leufroyia hesseli	Sp. nov	Valid	Landau, Van Dingenen & Ceulemans	Miocene (Tortonian)		France	A species of Leufroyia.	
Leufroyia ligeriana	Sp. nov	Valid	Landau, Van Dingenen & Ceulemans	Miocene (Tortonian)		France	A species of Leufroyia.	
Leufroyia renauleauensis	Sp. nov	Valid	Landau, Van Dingenen & Ceulemans	Miocene (Tortonian)		France	A species of Leufroyia.	
Leufroyia riccardoi	Sp. nov	Valid	Landau, Van Dingenen & Ceulemans	Miocene (Tortonian)		France	A species of Leufroyia.	
Leufroyia seani	Sp. nov	Valid	Landau, Van Dingenen & Ceulemans	Miocene (Tortonian)		France	A species of Leufroyia.	
Limacina parvabrazensis	Sp. nov	Valid	Garvie & Janssen in Garvie, Goedert & Janssen			United States	A species of Limacina.	
Limacina pseudopygmaea	Sp. nov	Valid	Garvie & Janssen in Garvie, Goedert & Janssen			United States	A species of Limacina.	
Limacina texanopsis	Sp. nov	Valid	Garvie in Garvie, Goedert & Janssen			United States	A species of Limacina.	
Limacina yadongensis	Sp. nov	Valid	Li et al.	Early Eocene	Zhepure Formation	China	A species of Limacina.	
Loriolotrema	Gen. et sp. nov	Valid	Gründel, Hostettler & Menkveld-Gfeller	Late Jurassic		Switzerland	A member of the family Brachytrematidae. Genus includes new species L. liriola.	
Lozouetina naonedosca	Sp. nov	Disputed	Pacaud & Gómez	Eocene (Bartonian)		France; Spain	A member of the family Ovulidae belonging to the subfamily Pediculariinae. Considered to be a junior synonym of Lozouetina recluzi by Dolin & Garvie (2026).	
Macromphalina alinemulderae	Sp. nov	Valid	Landau & Mulder	Pliocene		Spain	A species of Macromphalina.	
Macropupina	Gen. et sp. nov	Valid	Bullis et al.	Late Cretaceous (Cenomanian)	Burmese amber	Myanmar	A member of the family Pupinidae. Genus includes new species M. electricus.	
Mangelia burgersae	Sp. nov	Valid	Landau, Van Dingenen & Ceulemans	Miocene (Tortonian)		France	A species of Mangelia.	
Margarites hayashii	Sp. nov	Valid	Kiel, Aguilar & Kase	Late Pliocene	Bata Formation	Philippines	A species of Margarites.	
Megastomia pseudopolysarcula	Sp. nov	Valid	Landau et al.	Miocene (Tortonian)		France	A species of Megastomia.	
Menestho bertieae	Sp. nov	Valid	Landau et al.	Miocene (Tortonian)		France	A species of Menestho.	
Microsassia	Gen. et sp. nov	Valid	Craig & Tracey in Craig et al.	Eocene (Lutetian)		France	A member of the family Cymatiidae. The type species is M. inconspicua Craig & Tracey.	
Microtriton	Gen. et 2 sp. et comb. nov	Valid	Craig & Tracey in Craig et al.	Eocene		France	A member of the family Cymatiidae. The type species is M. biplicoides Craig & Tracey; genus also includes new species M. dollfusi Craig & Tracey, as well as "Lampusia (Simpulum)" bourdoti Cossmann (1897).	
Mitromorpha mulderi	Sp. nov	Valid	Landau, Van Dingenen & Ceulemans	Miocene (Tortonian)		France	A species of Mitromorpha.	
Modulus benoisti	Sp. nov	Valid	Lozouet, Cahuzac & Charles	Miocene (Serravallian)		France	A species of Modulus.	
Moelleria jansseni	Sp. nov	Valid	Hoeksema, Rijken & Simons	Pleistocene		France	A species of Moelleria.	
Monoplex dissimilis	Sp. nov	Valid	Landau et al.	Miocene		Indonesia	A species of Monoplex.	
Monoplex gradatus	Sp. nov	Valid	Craig, Tracey & Gain in Craig et al.	Eocene		France	A species of Monoplex.	
Nassitriton	Gen. et sp. nov	Valid	Craig & Tracey in Craig et al.	Eocene		France	A member of the family Cymatiidae. The type species is N. conicus Craig, Tracey & Le Renard; genus might also include "Lampusia (Sassia)" lennieri Cossmann & Pissarro (1901).	
Naticopsis sokensis	Sp. nov	Valid	Mazaev	Permian (Sakmarian)		Russia		
Nemdaella usensis	Sp. nov	Valid	Mazaev	Permian (Sakmarian)		Russia		
Neniopsilla	Gen. et sp. nov	Valid	Harzhauser et al.	Late Eocene		Spain	Genus includes new species N. amoena.	
Neritopsis brasili	Sp. nov	Valid	Symonds, Gain & Le Renard	Eocene		France	A species of Neritopsis.	
Neritopsis toddi	Sp. nov	Valid	Symonds, Gain & Le Renard	Eocene		France	A species of Neritopsis.	
Niveria ledoni	Sp. nov	Valid	Fehse & Vicián	Late Miocene		France	A species of Niveria.	
Niveria miocarinata	Sp. nov	Valid	Fehse & Vicián	Late Miocene		France	A species of Niveria.	
Ocinebrina bertai	Sp. nov	Valid	Kovács	Middle Miocene		Hungary	A species of Ocinebrina.	
Odostomia fortistriata	Sp. nov	Valid	Landau et al.	Miocene (Tortonian)		France	A species of Odostomia.	
Odostomia miopupa	Nom. nov	Valid	Landau et al.			France	A species of Odostomia; a replacement name for Odontostomia rissoides var. pupa Gougerot (1969).	
Odostomia robustissima	Sp. nov	Valid	Landau et al.	Miocene (Tortonian)		France	A species of Odostomia.	
Ovicarychium	Gen. et 2 sp. et comb. nov	Valid	Kadolsky	Eocene		France; Germany	A member of the family Ellobiidae belonging to the subfamily Carychiinae. The type species is O. ronlederi; genus also includes new species O.hennigeri, as well as O. bigeminatum (Deshayes, 1863), O. carbonarium (Wenz, 1932), O. interferens (Deshayes, 1863), O. polysarcum (Cossmann, 1914), O. quadridens(Andreae, 1884), O. remiense (Boissy, 1848) and O. sparnacense (Deshayes, 1863).	
Oxfordina	Gen. et comb. nov	Valid	Gründel, Hostettler & Gfeller	Late Jurassic (Oxfordian)	St-Ursanne-Formation	Switzerland	A member of the family Eucyclidae. The type species is "Trochus" crassicosta Buvignier (1852).	
Palaeostoa costellata	Sp. nov	Valid	Kadolsky	Early Eocene		Germany	A member of the family Palaeostoidae.	
Paleodiplommatina	Gen. et sp. nov	Disputed	Bullis et al.	Late Cretaceous (Cenomanian)	Burmese amber	Myanmar	A member of the family Diplommatinidae. Genus includes new species P. spelomphalos. Considered to be a junior synonym of the genus Euthema by Balashov (2020).	
Paracraticula? catalaunica	Sp. nov	Valid	Harzhauser et al.	Late Eocene		Spain		
Parasassia	Gen. et comb. et 2 sp. nov	Valid	Craig & Tracey in Craig et al.	Eocene		France	A member of the family Cymatiidae. The type species is "Triton" multigraniferum Deshayes (1835); genus also includes "Triton" bicinctum Deshayes (1835), "Triton" dumortieri Baudon (1853), "Lampusia (Simpulum)" polysarca Cossmann & Pissarro (1901), "Lampusia (Simpulum)" pustulifera Cossmann & Pissarro (1901) and "Murex" reticulosus Lamarck (1803), as well as new species P. globosa Craig & Tracey and P. polysarcoides Craig & Tracey.	
Parthenina brebioni	Sp. nov	Valid	Landau et al.	Miocene (Tortonian)		France	A species of Parthenina.	
Parthenina chauvereauensis	Sp. nov	Valid	Landau et al.	Miocene (Tortonian)		France	A species of Parthenina.	
Parthenina clementiensis	Sp. nov	Valid	Landau et al.	Miocene (Tortonian)		France	A species of Parthenina.	
Parthenina lamellata	Sp. nov	Valid	Landau et al.	Miocene (Tortonian)		France	A species of Parthenina.	
Parthenina ligeriana	Sp. nov	Valid	Landau et al.	Miocene (Tortonian)		France	A species of Parthenina.	
Parthenina milleti	Sp. nov	Valid	Landau et al.	Miocene (Tortonian)		France	A species of Parthenina.	
Parthenina pouweri	Sp. nov	Valid	Landau et al.	Miocene (Tortonian)		France	A species of Parthenina.	
Parthenina redoniana	Sp. nov	Valid	Landau et al.	Miocene (Tortonian)		France	A species of Parthenina.	
Parthenina sceauxensis	Sp. nov	Valid	Landau et al.	Miocene (Tortonian)		France	A species of Parthenina.	
Parthenina tenuicostata	Sp. nov	Valid	Landau et al.	Miocene (Tortonian)		France	A species of Parthenina.	
Parthenina wesselinghi	Sp. nov	Valid	Landau et al.	Miocene (Tortonian)		France	A species of Parthenina.	
Patella staceata	Sp. nov	Valid	Gründel, Hostettler & Gfeller	Late Jurassic (Oxfordian)	St-Ursanne-Formation	Switzerland	A species of Patella.	
Perissocyclos	Gen. et sp. nov	Valid	Bullis et al.	Late Cretaceous (Cenomanian)	Burmese amber	Myanmar	A member of the family Cyclophoridae. Genus includes new species P. kyrtostoma.	
Peruvispira brasilensis	Sp. nov	In press	Simões et al.	Late Paleozoic	Taciba Formation	Brazil		
Planitriton	Gen. et comb. nov	Valid	Craig & Tracey in Craig et al.	Eocene	Calcaire Grossier d'Etrechy	France	A member of the family Cymatiidae. The type species is "Triton" planicostatum Deshayes (1835).	
Platyzona gradata	Sp. nov	Valid	Ketwetsuriya et al.	Permian (Roadian)	Khao Khad Formation	Thailand		
Pleurotomaria pogibshiensis	Sp. nov	Valid	Ferrari et al.	Early Jurassic (Hettangian)	Pogibshi Formation	United States (Alaska)		
Pleurotomoides barnardi	Sp. nov	Valid	Landau, Van Dingenen & Ceulemans	Miocene (Tortonian)		France		
Pleurotomoides vanderdoncki	Sp. nov	Valid	Landau, Van Dingenen & Ceulemans	Miocene (Tortonian)		France		
Praealaerato venusta	Sp. nov	Valid	Fehse	Miocene		France	A member of the family Eratoidae.	
Profundimitra lacuiensis	Nom. nov	Valid	Nielsen & Ampuero	Early Miocene		Chile	A species of Profundimitra; a replacement name for Mitra martini Philippi (1887).	
Prososthenia krijgsmani	Sp. nov	Valid	Mandic, Harzhauser & Neubauer	Middle Miocene		Bosnia and Herzegovina		
Prososthenia milosevici	Sp. nov	Valid	Neubauer et al.	Miocene		Serbia	A member of the family Hydrobiidae belonging to the subfamily Pyrgulinae.	
Prososthenia? naissensis	Sp. nov	Valid	Neubauer et al.	Miocene		Serbia	A member of the family Hydrobiidae belonging to the subfamily Pyrgulinae.	
Prososthenia rundici	Sp. nov	Valid	Neubauer et al.	Miocene		Serbia	A member of the family Hydrobiidae belonging to the subfamily Pyrgulinae.	
Protocharonia	Gen. et comb. nov	Valid	Craig & Tracey in Craig et al.	Eocene		France	A member of the family Charoniidae. The type species is "Triton" formosum Deshayes (1865); genus also includes "Eutritonium (Sassia) gouetense" var. semitextum Cossmann (1919).	
Protoplex	Gen. et sp. et comb. nov	Valid	Craig & Tracey in Craig et al.	Eocene		France; United Kingdom	A member of the family Cymatiidae. The type species is P. gervillei Craig & Tracey; genus also includes "Murex" nodularius Lamarck (1803), "Sassia" websteri Wrigley (1932) and "Sassia" biserialis Wrigley (1932).	
Provanna azurini	Sp. nov	Valid	Kiel, Aguilar & Kase	Late Pliocene	Bata Formation	Philippines	A species of Provanna.	
Pseudangaria	Gen. et comb. nov	Valid	Gründel, Hostettler & Gfeller	Late Jurassic (Oxfordian)	St-Ursanne-Formation	Switzerland	A member of the family Angariidae. The type species is "Delphinula" kobyi De Loriol in De Loriol & Koby (1895).	
Pseudoneptunea constantinensis	Sp. nov	Valid	Gain & Belliard	Eocene		France		
Pseudoneptunea prima	Sp. nov	Valid	Gain & Belliard	Paleocene (Thanetian)		France		
Pseudoneptunea trinodularia	Sp. nov	Valid	Gain & Belliard	Eocene		France		
Pseudoscilla breitenbergeri	Sp. nov	Valid	Landau et al.	Miocene (Tortonian)		France	A species of Pseudoscilla.	
Pseudotectonica	Gen. et sp. nov	Valid	Harzhauser et al.	Late Eocene		Spain	Genus includes new species P. pulchra.	
Pyrgulina cancellatissima	Sp. nov	Valid	Landau et al.	Miocene (Tortonian)		France	A species of Pyrgulina.	
Pyrgulina presselierensis	Sp. nov	Valid	Landau et al.	Miocene (Tortonian)		France	A species of Pyrgulina.	
Raphitoma breitenbergeri	Sp. nov	Valid	Landau, Van Dingenen & Ceulemans	Miocene (Tortonian)		France	A species of Raphitoma.	
Raphitoma dellabellaorum	Sp. nov	Valid	Landau, Van Dingenen & Ceulemans	Miocene (Tortonian)		France	A species of Raphitoma.	
Raphitoma soniusae	Sp. nov	Valid	Landau, Van Dingenen & Ceulemans	Miocene (Tortonian)		France	A species of Raphitoma.	
Raphitoma vogeli	Sp. nov	Valid	Landau, Van Dingenen & Ceulemans	Miocene (Tortonian)		France	A species of Raphitoma.	
Rimula lobilloensis	Sp. nov	Valid	Landau & Mulder	Pliocene		Spain	A species of Rimula.	
Rimulopsis torulosus	Sp. nov	Valid	Gründel, Hostettler & Gfeller	Late Jurassic (Oxfordian)	St-Ursanne-Formation	Switzerland	A member of the family Fissurellidae.	
Rotatrigonostoma	Gen. et sp. et comb. nov	Valid	Landau, Breitenberger & Harzhauser	Miocene		Austria; Romania	A member of the family Cancellariidae. Genus includes new species R. reinholdkunzi, as well as "Pseudomalaxis" boettgeri Cossmann (1916).	
Sassiella	Gen. et 11 sp. et comb. nov	Valid	Craig & Tracey in Craig et al.	Eocene		France	A member of the family Cymatiidae. The type species is S. lacertina Craig & Tracey; genus also includes new species S. angulata Craig & Tracey, S. bacata Craig & Tracey, S. caputdraconis Craig & Tracey, S. crassilabrum Craig & Tracey, S. decussata Craig & Tracey, S. multivittata Craig & Tracey, S. puncticarinata Craig & Tracey, S. radulfivillensis Craig & Tracey, S. scalaris Craig & Tracey and S. vincta Craig & Tracey, as well as "Murex" colubrinus Lamarck (1803) and "Lampusia (Simpulum) polyzonalis" var. parameces Cossmann & Pissarro (1901).	
Schilderina charlesi	Sp. nov	Valid	Dolin & Aguerre	Miocene		France	A member of the family Cypraeidae.	
Schilderina vaesseni	Sp. nov	Valid	Dolin & Aguerre	Miocene		France	A member of the family Cypraeidae.	
Scissurella nesbittae	Sp. nov	Valid	Geiger & Goedert	Eocene or Oligocene (latest Priabonian or earliest Rupelian)	Gries Ranch Formation	United States (Washington)	A species of Scissurella.	
Scutus mirus	Sp. nov	Valid	Gard	Late Oligocene to early Miocene		New Zealand	A species of Scutus.	
Seguenzia statiana	Sp. nov	Valid	Sosso, Bertolaso & Dell'Angelo	Miocene (Tortonian)	Marne di S. Agata Fossili Formation	Italy	A species of Seguenzia.	
Selvovum	Gen. et comb. nov	Valid	Juárez-Ruiz, Matamales-Andreu & Kadolsky	Late Eocene		Spain	A member of the family Vidaliellidae; a new genus for "Ampullaria" selvensis.	
Semicypraea italorossii	Sp. nov	Valid	Checchi, Zamberlan & Alberti	Eocene (Ypresian-Lutetian)		Italy	A member of the family Cypraeidae.	
Semiricinula preturbinoides	Sp. nov	Valid	Landau et al.	Miocene (Langhian)		Indonesia	A species of Semiricinula.	
Skenea wesselinghi	Sp. nov	Valid	Hoeksema & Simons	Pliocene		Belgium; Netherlands	A species of Skenea.	
Skeneopsoides	Gen. et sp. nov	Valid	Hoeksema, Rijken & Simons	Pliocene		Netherlands	A member of the family Skeneidae. Genus includes new species S. dejongi.	
Spiralinella pagoda	Sp. nov	Valid	Landau et al.	Miocene (Tortonian)		France	A species of Spiralinella.	
Spinatus	Gen. et 2 sp. et comb. nov	Valid	Dekkers et al.	Miocene		Indonesia	A member of the family Strombidae. The type species is S. echinatus; genus also includes new species S. wonosariensis, as well as "Strombus" tjilonganensis Martin (1899).	
Steenbergia wohlmuthorum	Sp. nov	Valid	Walther & Groh	Late Pleistocene		Madeira	A member of the family Geomitridae.	
Stegocoelia samaraensis	Sp. nov	Valid	Mazaev	Permian (Sakmarian)		Russia		
Stephaniphera	Gen. et sp. nov	Valid	Schneider, Kollmann & Pickford	Late Cretaceous	Al-Khodh Formation	Oman	A member of Cerithioidea belonging to the family Hemisinidae. The type species is S. coronata.	
Strebloceras kobayashii	Sp. nov	Valid	Haga	Middle Pleistocene	Toyohashi Formation	Japan	A member of the family Caecidae.	
Streptacis? khaokhadensis	Sp. nov	Valid	Ketwetsuriya et al.	Permian (Roadian)	Khao Khad Formation	Thailand		
Streptacis volgenesis	Sp. nov	Valid	Mazaev	Permian (Sakmarian)		Russia		
Striactaenonina elegans	Sp. nov	Valid	Ferrari, Little & Atkinson	Early Jurassic (Toarcian)	Blea Wyke Sandstone Formation	United Kingdom	A member of Architectibranchia belonging to the family Tubiferidae.	
Subtemenia	Gen. et comb. nov	Valid	Schneider, Kollmann & Pickford	Late Cretaceous	Al-Khodh Formation	Iran; Oman	A member of the family Pseudomelaniidae. The type species is "Paryphostoma" morgani Douvillé (1904).	
Siphocypraea daughenbaughi	Sp. nov		Berschauer & Waller		Tamiami Formation	United States (Florida)	A member of the family Cypraeidae.	
Subpterynotus feliciae	Sp. nov		Petuch & Berschauer			United States (Florida)	A species of Subpterynotus.	
Subpterynotus gabbi	Sp. nov		Petuch & Berschauer			United States (Florida)	A species of Subpterynotus.	
Teretia horroi	Sp. nov	Valid	Landau, Van Dingenen & Ceulemans	Miocene (Tortonian)		France	A species of Teretia.	
Trachydomia suwanneeae	Sp. nov	Valid	Ketwetsuriya et al.	Permian (Roadian)	Khao Khad Formation	Thailand		
Trachyspira eleganta	Sp. nov	Valid	Ketwetsuriya et al.	Permian (Roadian)	Khao Khad Formation	Thailand		
Triptychia catalanica	Sp. nov	Valid	Harzhauser et al.	Late Eocene		Spain		
Triptychia tomerdingensis	Sp. nov	Valid	Kadolsky	Miocene (Aquitanian)		Germany	A member of the family Filholiidae.	
Trochomodulus stampinicus	Sp. nov	Valid	Lozouet, Cahuzac & Charles	Oligocene (Rupelian)		France	A member of the family Modulidae.	
Truncatellina dilatatus	Sp. nov	Valid	Yu	Late Cretaceous (Cenomanian)	Burmese amber	Myanmar	Originally described as a species of Truncatellina; Balashov (2021) transferred it to the genus Euthema.	
Trypanocochlea lopburiensis	Sp. nov	Valid	Ketwetsuriya et al.	Permian (Roadian)	Khao Khad Formation	Thailand		
Turbo histrioides	Sp. nov	Valid	Kase et al.	Miocene		Japan	A species of Turbo.	
Turbo izuensis	Sp. nov	Valid	Kase et al.	Miocene		Japan	A species of Turbo.	
Turricarychium	Gen. et sp. nov	Valid	Kadolsky	Early Eocene		Germany	A member of the family Ellobiidae belonging to the subfamily Carychiinae. The type species is T. muelleri.	
Turritelloidea stepheni	Sp. nov	Valid	Ferrari, Little & Atkinson	Early Jurassic (Toarcian)	Blea Wyke Sandstone Formation	United Kingdom	A member of the family Gordenellidae.	
Umbilia darryli	Sp. nov	Valid	Hawke	Miocene		Australia	A species of Umbilia.	
Umbilia hallani	Sp. nov	Valid	Hawke	Miocene		Australia	A species of Umbilia.	
Vermetujanulus	Gen. et sp. nov	Valid	Walther & Groh	Late Pleistocene		Madeira	A member of the family Gastrodontidae. Genus includes new species V. boessnecki.	
Vetulonia philippinensis	Sp. nov	Valid	Kiel, Aguilar & Kase	Late Pliocene	Bata Formation	Philippines	A species of Vetulonia.	
Vexillum pseudoschafferi	Sp. nov	Valid	Biskupič	Miocene (Serravallian)	Studienka Formation	Slovakia	A species of Vexillum.	
Vexillum svagrovskyi	Sp. nov	Valid	Biskupič	Miocene (Serravallian)	Studienka Formation	Slovakia	A species of Vexillum.	
Vicetia bizzottoi	Sp. nov	Valid	Dominici, Fornasiero & Giusberti	Eocene (Priabonian)	Possagno Marl Formation	Italy	A member of the family Cypraeidae belonging to the subfamily Gisortiinae.	
Worthenia humiligrada	Sp. nov	Valid	Ketwetsuriya et al.	Permian (Roadian)	Khao Khad Formation	Thailand		
Worthenia morovi	Sp. nov	Valid	Mazaev	Permian (Sakmarian)		Russia		
Xenostoma	Gen. et sp. nov	Disputed	Bullis et al.	Late Cretaceous (Cenomanian)	Burmese amber	Myanmar	Genus includes new species X. lophopleura. Originally described as a member of the family Pupinidae; Balashov (2021) considered Xenostoma to be a junior synonym of the diplommatinid genus Euthema, and transferred X. lophopleura to the latter genus.	
Yunnania inflata	Sp. nov	Valid	Ketwetsuriya et al.	Permian (Roadian)	Khao Khad Formation	Thailand		
Zuella	Gen. et sp. nov	Valid	Kadolsky	Early Eocene		Germany	A member of the family Ellobiidae belonging to the subfamily Carychiinae. The type species is Z. venusta.	

=== Research ===
- A study on the evolutionary history of pteropods, based on molecular data and revised fossil evidence, is published by Peijnenburg et al. (2020).

== Bivalves ==
=== New taxa ===
Name	Novelty	Status	Authors	Age	Type locality	Country	Notes	Images
Adelfia	Gen. et comb. et sp. nov	Valid	Alvarez & Río	Eocene	La Meseta Formation; Loreto Formation; Submeseta Formation	Antarctica; Chile	A member of the family Veneridae. The type species is "Eumarcia" austrolissa Stilwell & Zinsmeister (1992); genus also includes "Venus" arenosa Ortmann (1899), as well as new species A. omega.	
Aguileria romualdoensis	Sp. nov	In press	Rodrigues et al.	Early Cretaceous (Aptian)	Romualdo Formation	Brazil	A member of the family Bakevelliidae.	
Amudariella	Gen. et comb. nov	Valid	Cooper	Cretaceous		Uzbekistan	A member of Trigoniida belonging to the group Myophorelloidea. The type species is "Trigonia" amudariensis Arkhanguelsky (1916); genus also includes "Korobkovitrigonia" subamudariensis Saveliev (1958).	
Araripenaia	Gen. et sp. nov	Valid	Da Silva et al.	Early Cretaceous	Crato Formation	Brazil	An unionid bivalve with possible hyriid affinities. Genus includes new species A. elliptica.	
Araripevellia	Gen. et sp. nov	In press	Rodrigues et al.	Early Cretaceous (Aptian)	Romualdo Formation	Brazil	A member of the family Bakevelliidae. Genus includes new species A. musculosa.	
Arca budoensis	Sp. nov	Valid	Amano in Amano & Kurita	Early Miocene	Asahi Formation	Japan	A species of Arca.	
Archivesica pastori	Sp. nov	Valid	Kiel, Aguilar & Kase	Late Pliocene	Bata Formation	Philippines	A member of the family Vesicomyidae.	
Astarte danningeri	Sp. nov	Valid	Mandic et al.	Early Miocene		Austria	A species of Astarte.	
Avichlamys hoferhauseri	Sp. nov	Valid	Szente	Early Triassic	Werfen Formation	Austria		
Bobkovaella	Gen. et comb. nov	Valid	Cooper	Cretaceous		Russia	A member of Trigoniida belonging to the group Myophorelloidea. Genus includes "Trigonia" sydorenkoeremeievae Scheglova-Borodina (1960) and "Korobkovitrigonia" tobolica Pojarkova (1990).	
Bogdanovaella	Gen. et comb. nov	Valid	Cooper	Cretaceous		Turkmenistan; Uzbekistan	A member of Trigoniida belonging to the group Myophorelloidea. Genus includes "Korobkovitrigonia" conspecta Vinokurova (1970), "Trigonia" darwaseana Romanovsky (1890), "Trigonia" ferganensis Arkhanguelsky (1916), "Korobkovitrigonia" kugitangensis Burkova (1963), "Trigonia" rhombifera Romanovsky (1890) and "Korobkovitrigonia" tagamensis Belyakova (1970).	
Cochisella	Gen. et comb. nov	Valid	Cooper	Cretaceous		United States (Arizona; Texas)	A member of Trigoniida belonging to the group Myophorelloidea. The type species is "Trigonia" guildi Stoyanow (1949); genus also includes "Trigonia" dumblei Stoyanow (1949), "Trigonia" gordoni Whitney (1952), "Trigonia" mearnsi Stoyanow (1949), "Trigonia" resoluta Stoyanow (1949), "Trigonia" saavedra Stoyanow (1949) and "Trigonia" taffi Cragin (1893).	
Channelaxinus antipoloensis	Sp. nov	Valid	Kiel, Aguilar & Kase	Early Pleistocene	Bata Formation	Philippines	A member of the family Thyasiridae.	
Conchocele majimai	Sp. nov	Valid	Kiel, Aguilar & Kase	Late Pliocene	Bata Formation	Philippines	A member of the family Thyasiridae.	
Conchocele visayaensis	Sp. nov	Valid	Kiel, Aguilar & Kase	Early Pleistocene	Bata Formation	Philippines	A member of the family Thyasiridae.	
Cratonaia	Gen. et sp. nov	Valid	Da Silva et al.	Early Cretaceous (Aptian)	Crato Formation	Brazil	A bivalve belonging to the order Unionida and to the group Silesunionoidea. Genus includes new species C. novaolindensis.	
Cristaflabellum	Gen. et comb. nov	Valid	Hautmann et al.	Triassic	San Cassiano Formation	Bosnia and Herzegovina; Italy	A member of the group Aviculopectinoidea. The type species is "Pecten" volaris Bittner (1902); genus also includes "Pecten" interstriatus Münster (1841).	
Diplodonta oesia	Nom. nov	Valid	Pacaud	Eocene (Lutetian)		France	A replacement name for Diplodonta profunda Deshayes (1857)	
Dulcina liogliogensis	Sp. nov	Valid	Kiel, Aguilar & Kase	Late Pliocene	Bata Formation	Philippines	A member of the family Lucinidae.	
Dulcina magoi	Sp. nov	Valid	Kiel, Aguilar & Kase	Late Pliocene	Bata Formation	Philippines	A member of the family Lucinidae.	
Elliptiolucina fernandoi	Sp. nov	Valid	Kiel, Aguilar & Kase	Late Pliocene to early Pleistocene	Bata Formation	Philippines	A member of the family Lucinidae.	
Eothyasira	Gen. et comb. nov	Valid	Karapunar et al.	Early Jurassic (Pliensbachian)		Germany	Genus includes "Venus" antiqua Münster (1841).	
Geloina amithoscutana	Sp. nov	Valid	Schneider, Kollmann & Pickford	Late Cretaceous	Al-Khodh Formation	Oman	A member of the family Cyrenidae.	
Gibbolucina aremorica	Nom. nov	Valid	Pacaud	Eocene		France	A member of the family Lucinidae; a replacement name for Lucina profunda Dufour (1881)	
Globodiscus	Gen. et 2 sp. nov	Valid	Hautmann et al.	Triassic		Indonesia; Romania	A member of the group Aviculopectinoidea. Genus includes new species G. kiliani and G. vinzenti.	
Gyrostrea bogdanovae	Sp. nov	Valid	Kosenko & Metelkin	Early Cretaceous (Hauterivian–Barremian)	Kugusem Formation	Kazakhstan	An oyster.	
Illyricocongeria forcakovici	Sp. nov	Valid	Mandic, Harzhauser & Neubauer	Middle Miocene		Bosnia and Herzegovina		
Lima allerdingensis	Sp. nov	Valid	Mandic et al.	Early Miocene		Austria	A species of Lima.	
Limopsis quenstedti	Nom. nov	Valid	Karapunar et al.				A replacement name for Nucula aurita Quenstedt (1856).	
Lucinoma canudai	Sp. nov	Valid	Kiel, Aguilar & Kase	Early Pleistocene	Bata Formation	Philippines	A member of the family Lucinidae.	
Lucinoma kosatorea	Sp. nov	Valid	Kiel, Aguilar & Kase	Early Pleistocene	Bata Formation	Philippines	A member of the family Lucinidae.	
Lucinoma tinagoensis	Sp. nov	Valid	Kiel, Aguilar & Kase	Early Pleistocene	Bata Formation	Philippines	A member of the family Lucinidae.	
Lucinoma velosoi	Sp. nov	Valid	Kiel, Aguilar & Kase	Early Pleistocene	Bata Formation	Philippines	A member of the family Lucinidae.	
Lutetigonia	Gen. et comb. nov	Valid	Cooper	Cretaceous		France; Tunisia	A member of Trigoniida belonging to the group Myophorelloidea. The type species is "Trigonia" palmata Leymerie (1842); genus also includes "Trigonia" cherahilensis Mongin (1951).	
Lyropecten terrysmithae	Sp. nov	Valid	Powell, Millard & Garcia	Miocene	Monterey Formation; Santa Margarita Sandstone	United States (California)	A scallop.	
Macheromenilia	Gen. et comb. nov	Valid	Cooper	Cretaceous		France	A member of Trigoniida belonging to the group Myophorelloidea. The type species is "Trigonia" constantii d'Orbigny (1844).	
Malletia tsubetsuensis	Sp. nov	Valid	Matsubara in Matsubara et al.	Miocene (Aquitanian)	Tsubetsu Formation	Japan	A member of the family Malletiidae	
Marciachlys	Gen. et comb. nov	Valid	Alvarez & Río	Eocene	Submeseta Formation	Antarctica	A member of the family Veneridae. The type species is "Eurhomalea" inflata Zinsmeister (1984).	
Mezounio	Gen. et sp. nov	Valid	Zakharov in Zakharov et al.	Middle Jurassic (Bajocian)		Russia	An unionid bivalve. Genus includes new species M. zverkovi.	
Monginellopsis	Gen. et sp. nov	Valid	Da Silva et al.	Early Cretaceous	Crato Formation	Brazil	A bivalve with possible trigonioidid affinities. Genus includes new species M. bellaradiata.	
Monopleura alesta	Sp. nov	Valid	Masse & Fenerci-Masse	Early Cretaceous (Barremian)		France	A rudist bivalve.	
Monopleura jurensis	Sp. nov	Valid	Masse & Fenerci-Masse	Early Cretaceous (Hauterivian)		France	A rudist bivalve.	
Muscatella	Gen. et sp. nov	Valid	Schneider, Kollmann & Pickford	Late Cretaceous	Al-Khodh Formation	Oman	A member of the family Cyrenidae. The type species is M. biszczukae.	
Myonera inouei	Sp. nov	Valid	Amano in Amano & Kurita	Paleocene (Selandian)	Tomikawa Formation	Japan	A member of the family Cuspidariidae.	
Myonia aparicioi	Sp. nov	Valid	Díaz Saravia & González	Carboniferous (Pennsylvanian)	Santa Elena Formation	Argentina		
Nanogyra brevisulcata	Sp. nov	Valid	Toscano & Lazo	Early Cretaceous	Neuquén Basin	Argentina	A bivalve belonging to the family Gryphaeidae.	
Neoquadratotrigonia	Gen. et comb. nov	Valid	Cooper	Cretaceous		Belgium; France; United Kingdom	A member of Trigoniida belonging to the group Myophorelloidea. The type species is "Trigonia" quadrata Agassiz (1840); genus also includes "Trigonia daedalea" bracquegniensis Gillet (1920, raised to the rank of the species N. bracquegniensis), "Trigonia daedalea" var. confusa Lycett (1875, raised to the rank of the species N. confusa), "Trigonia" daedalea Parkinson (1811), "Trigonia" rudis Parkinson (1811) and "Trigonia" spectabilis Sowerby (1826).	
Nicaniella schoberti	Sp. nov	Valid	Karapunar et al.	Early Jurassic (Pliensbachian)		Germany		
Oesterheldia	Gen. et sp. nov	Valid	Pérez & Giachetti	Late Oligocene – early Miocene		Argentina	A member of the family Carditidae. The type species is "Venericardia" cannada Ihering (1907); genus also includes "Cyclocardia" dalek Pérez & del Río (2017).	
Palaeomutela australis	Sp. nov	Valid	Guerrini et al.	Permian	Rio do Rasto Formation	Brazil	A bivalve belonging to the group Actinodontida and the family Palaeomutelidae. Announced in 2019; the final version of the article naming it was published in 2020.	
Paracuspidaria	Gen. et comb. nov	Valid	Karapunar et al.	Early Jurassic (Pliensbachian)		Germany	Genus includes "Cypricardia" goldfussiana Kuhn (1935) and "Cypricardia" walteri Kuhn (1935).	
Permophorus? yrigoyeni	Sp. nov	Valid	Díaz Saravia & González	Carboniferous (Pennsylvanian)	Santa Elena Formation	Argentina		
Pholadomya miyanoharaensis	Nom. nov	Valid	Matsubara	Cretaceous		Japan	A replacement name for Pholadomya japonica Amano (1956).	
Pratulum kurrawchipellu	Sp. nov	Valid	Rojas & Nielsen	Early Miocene	Ipún Beds	Chile	A species of Pratulum.	
Pratulum terpoorteni	Sp. nov	Valid	Rojas & Nielsen	Early Miocene	Navidad Formation	Chile	A species of Pratulum.	
Promytilus rochacamposi	Sp. nov	Valid	Díaz Saravia & González	Carboniferous (Pennsylvanian)	Santa Elena Formation	Argentina		
Protocardia broilii	Sp. nov	Valid	Yanin	Early Cretaceous (Berriasian)		Crimean Peninsula		
Relogiincola	Gen. et sp. nov	Valid	Guerrini et al.	Permian	Rio do Rasto Formation	Brazil	A bivalve belonging to the group Edmondioidea and the family Pachydomidae. Genus includes new species R. delicata. Announced in 2019; the final version of the article naming it was published in 2020.	
Retroceramus alliensis	Sp. nov	Valid	Zakharov in Zakharov et al.	Middle Jurassic (Bajocian)		Russia		
Retroceramus (?) inopinatus	Sp. nov	Valid	Zakharov in Zakharov et al.	Middle Jurassic (Bajocian)		Russia		
Rollieria franconica	Sp. nov	Valid	Karapunar et al.	Early Jurassic (Pliensbachian)		Germany		
Rollieria goldfussi	Nom. nov	Valid	Karapunar et al.				A replacement name for Nucula subovalis Goldfuss (1837).	
Romanovskajaella	Gen. et comb. nov	Valid	Cooper	Cretaceous			A member of Trigoniida belonging to the group Myophorelloidea. The type species is "Korobkovitrigonia" mediasiatica Belyakova (1970); genus also includes "Korobkovitrigonia" akkaptschigensis Belyakova (1970), "Korobkovitrigonia" bobkovae Belyakova (1970), "Korobkovitrigonia" gissarensis Belyakova (1970) and "Korobkovitrigonia" rugosa Belyakova (1970).	
Romanovskiella	Gen. et comb. nov	Valid	Cooper	Cretaceous		Uzbekistan	A member of Trigoniida belonging to the group Myophorelloidea. The type species is "Trigonia" romanovskii Arkhanguelsky (1916); genus also includes "Trigonia" aralensis Arkhangelsky (1912).	
Saveligonia	Gen. et comb. nov	Valid	Cooper	Cretaceous		Russia; Turkmenistan	A member of Trigoniida belonging to the group Myophorelloidea. The type species is "Litschkovitrigonia" media Saveliev (1958); genus also includes "Litschkovitrigonia inguschensis" alta Prozorovskii (1961, raised to the rank of the species S. alta), "Trigonia" inguschensis Renngarten (1926), "Trigonia" subdaedalea Renngarten (1926) and "Litschkovitrigonia" tenuituberculata Saveliev (1958).	
Shajia	Gen. et sp. nov	Valid	Rao et al.	Early Cretaceous (Aptian or Albian)	Langshan Formation	China; India	A rudist bivalve. Genus includes new species S. tibetica.	
Terraia decarinata	Sp. nov	Valid	Guerrini et al.	Permian	Rio do Rasto Formation	Brazil	A bivalve belonging to the family Astartidae. Announced in 2019; the final version of the article naming it was published in 2020.	
Trigonipraxis madjerensis	Sp. nov	Valid	Neubauer et al.	Miocene		Serbia	A member of the family Dreissenidae belonging to the subfamily Congeriinae.	
Vinokurovaella	Gen. et comb. nov	Valid	Cooper	Cretaceous			A member of Trigoniida belonging to the group Myophorelloidea. The type species is "Korobkovitrigonia" grumosa Vinokurova (1970); genus also includes "Quadratotrigonia" turkmenica Vinokurova (1970).	

== Other mollusks ==
=== New taxa ===
Name	Novelty	Status	Authors	Age	Type locality	Country	Notes	Images
Acanthochitona interglacialis	Sp. nov	Valid	Dell'Angelo et al.	Late Pleistocene		Saudi Arabia	A chiton, a species of Acanthochitona.	
Apoptopegma joyceae	Sp. nov	Valid	Smith, Brock & Paterson	Cambrian (Guzhangian)	Shannon Formation	Australia	A rostroconch.	
Catalanispira	Gen. et sp. et comb. nov	Valid	Ebbestad, Kolata & Isakar	Ordovician (Darriwilian and Sandbian)	Kõrgekallas; Platteville	Estonia; United States (Illinois)	A member of the family Onychochilidae. The type species is C. plattevillensis; genus also includes "Clisospira" reinwaldti Öpik (1930).	
Craspedochiton fontlevensis	Sp. nov	Valid	Dell'Angelo et al.	Miocene (Burdigalian)		France	A chiton, a species of Craspedochiton.	
Craspedochiton lozoueti	Sp. nov	Valid	Dell'Angelo et al.	Oligocene (Rupelian)		France	A chiton, a species of Craspedochiton.	
Crassaplax	Gen. et sp. nov	Valid	Högström, Ebbestad & Suzuki	Ordovician (Katian)	Boda Limestone	Sweden	A member of Paleoloricata. The type species is C. collicola.	
Lepidochitona chalossensis	Sp. nov	Valid	Dell'Angelo et al.	Oligocene (Rupelian)		France	A chiton, a species of Lepidochitona.	
Lepidochitona charlesi	Sp. nov	Valid	Dell'Angelo et al.	Oligocene (Rupelian)		France	A chiton, a species of Lepidochitona.	
Lepidochitona larratensis	Sp. nov	Valid	Dell'Angelo et al.	Oligocene (Rupelian)		France	A chiton, a species of Lepidochitona.	
Lepidochitona tarbelliana	Sp. nov	Valid	Dell'Angelo et al.	Oligocene (Rupelian)		France	A chiton, a species of Lepidochitona.	
Lepidochitona tessellata	Sp. nov	Valid	Dell'Angelo et al.	Oligocene (Rupelian)		France	A chiton, a species of Lepidochitona.	
Lepidochitona vancuycki	Sp. nov	Valid	Dell'Angelo et al.	Oligocene (Rupelian)		France	A chiton, a species of Lepidochitona.	
Lucilina aqabaensis	Sp. nov	Valid	Dell'Angelo et al.	Late Pleistocene		Saudi Arabia	A chiton, a species of Lucilina.	
Qaleruaqia	Gen. et sp. nov	Valid	Peel	Cambrian Stage 4	Aftenstjernesø Formation	Greenland	A member of the family Mattheviidae. The type species is Q. sodermanorum.	
Pseudoacanthochitona marsanensis	Sp. nov	Valid	Dell'Angelo et al.	Miocene (Burdigalian)		France	A chiton.	
Stenosemus radiatus	Sp. nov	Valid	Dell'Angelo et al.	Miocene (Burdigalian)		France	A chiton.	
Tonicella adunca	Sp. nov	Valid	Dell'Angelo et al.	Miocene (Aquitanian)		France	A chiton, a species of Tonicella.	
Tonicella nuda	Sp. nov	Valid	Dell'Angelo et al.	Oligocene (Rupelian)		France	A chiton, a species of Tonicella.	

=== Research ===
- New specimens of Pelagiella exigua with associated impressions of two clusters of chaetae, providing new information on the anatomy of this taxon, are described from the Cambrian Kinzers Formation (Pennsylvania, United States) by Thomas, Runnegar & Matt (2020), who infer the occurrence of a pair of chaeta-bearing appendages extending from the anterior body wall or foot of the animal (unique among living and extinct molluscs), and interpret Pelagiella as the earliest known stem gastropod.
