= Rimula =

Rimula may refer to:

- Rimula (gastropod)
- Rimula (fungus)
- Shell Rimula
