= Bactrocythara ascara =

Scientific classification
- Kingdom: Animalia
- Phylum: Mollusca
- Class: Gastropoda
- Subclass: Caenogastropoda
- Order: Neogastropoda
- Superfamily: Conoidea
- Family: Mangeliidae
- Genus: Bactrocythara
- Species: B. ascara

Binomial name
- Bactrocythara ascara (W.H. Dall & C.T. Simpson, 1900)

Synonyms
- † Mangilia ascara W.H. Dall & C.T. Simpson, 1900

Extinct species of gastropod

Bactrocythara ascara is an extinct species of sea snail, a marine gastropod mollusk in the family Mangeliidae.

This name is probably a misspelling of Bactrocythara asarca (Dall & Simpson, 1901)

== Distribution ==
This extinct species was found in Miocene strata of the Bowden Formation, Jamaica; age range: 7.246 to 2.588 Ma
