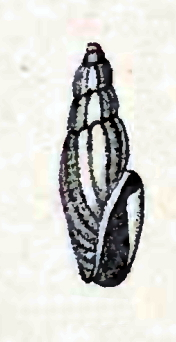
- Drawing of a shell of Bactrocythara labiosa

Scientific classification
- Kingdom: Animalia
- Phylum: Mollusca
- Class: Gastropoda
- Subclass: Caenogastropoda
- Order: Neogastropoda
- Superfamily: Conoidea
- Family: Mangeliidae
- Genus: Bactrocythara
- Species: B. labiosa

Binomial name
- Bactrocythara labiosa (E.A. Smith, 1872)

Synonyms
- Clathurella labiosa E.A. Smith, 1872; Philbertia thielei Knudsen, J., 1952

= Bactrocythara labiosa =

Species of gastropod

Bactrocythara labiosa is a species of sea snail, a marine gastropod mollusk in the family Mangeliidae.

== Description ==
The length of the shell attains 7 mm.

(Original description in Latin) The shell is elongate‑ovate and whitish. It consists of six whorls that show a translucent zone just below the suture. The whorls are moderately convex and slightly angled near their upper part. They are strongly ribbed with oblique longitudinal costae and are crossed by transverse grooves; the grooves are indistinct where they pass over the ribs.

The aperture is narrow and elongate, reaching a length that equals the spire, and it becomes constricted toward the base. The anal notch is distinct. The outer lip is very thick.

The shell is obliquely longitudinally costate, transversely sulcate. The sulci are indistinct on the ribs. The whorls are angulated above . The color of the shell is white, with a pellucid zone below the suture.

== Distribution ==
This species is found in the Atlantic Ocean off the Cape Verdes, West Africa, Ghana, Angola.
