= Rimula californiana =

Scientific classification
- Kingdom: Animalia
- Phylum: Mollusca
- Class: Gastropoda
- Subclass: Vetigastropoda
- Order: Lepetellida
- Family: Fissurellidae
- Subfamily: Rimulinae
- Genus: Rimula
- Species: R. californiana

Binomial name
- Rimula californiana Berry, 1964

Species of gastropod

Rimula californiana is a species of sea snail, a marine gastropod mollusk in the family Fissurellidae, the keyhole limpets and slit limpets.
