= Rimula aequisculpta =

Scientific classification
- Kingdom: Animalia
- Phylum: Mollusca
- Class: Gastropoda
- Subclass: Vetigastropoda
- Order: Lepetellida
- Family: Fissurellidae
- Genus: Rimula
- Species: R. aequisculpta

Binomial name
- Rimula aequisculpta Dall, 1927

Species of gastropod

Rimula aequisculpta is a species of sea snail, a marine gastropod mollusk in the family Fissurellidae, the keyhole limpets.
