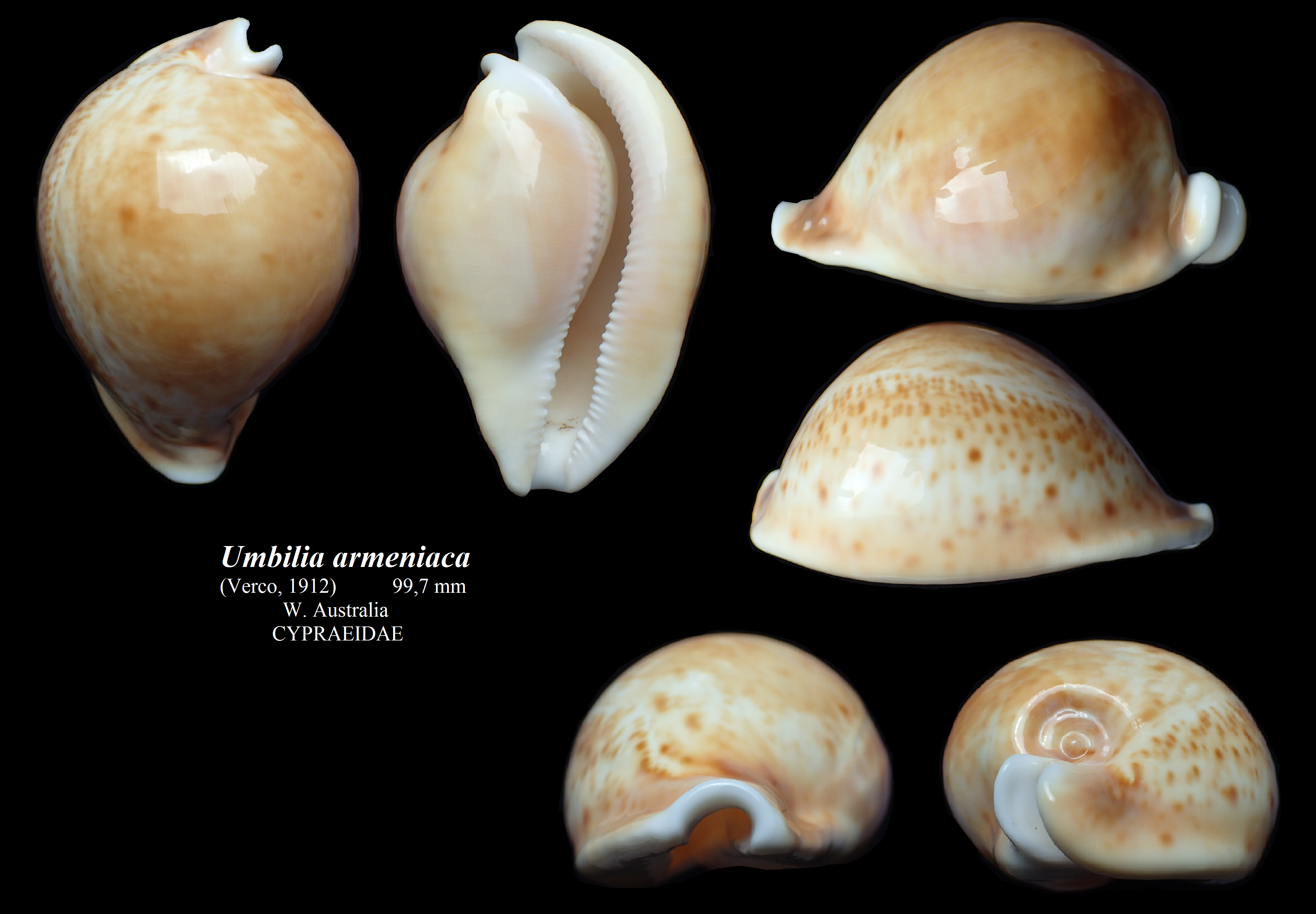

Scientific classification
- Kingdom: Animalia
- Phylum: Mollusca
- Class: Gastropoda
- Subclass: Caenogastropoda
- Order: Littorinimorpha
- Family: Cypraeidae
- Genus: Umbilia
- Species: U. armeniaca

Binomial name
- Umbilia armeniaca Verco, 1912

= Umbilia armeniaca =

Species of gastropod

Umbilia armeniaca is a species of sea snail, a cowry, a marine gastropod mollusk in the family Cypraeidae, the cowries.
