= Umbilia oriettae =

Scientific classification
- Kingdom: Animalia
- Phylum: Mollusca
- Class: Gastropoda
- Subclass: Caenogastropoda
- Order: Littorinimorpha
- Family: Cypraeidae
- Genus: Umbilia
- Species: U. oriettae

Binomial name
- Umbilia oriettae Lorenz & Massiglia, 2005

Species of gastropod

Umbilia oriettae is a species of sea snail, a cowry, a marine gastropod mollusk in the family Cypraeidae, the cowries.
