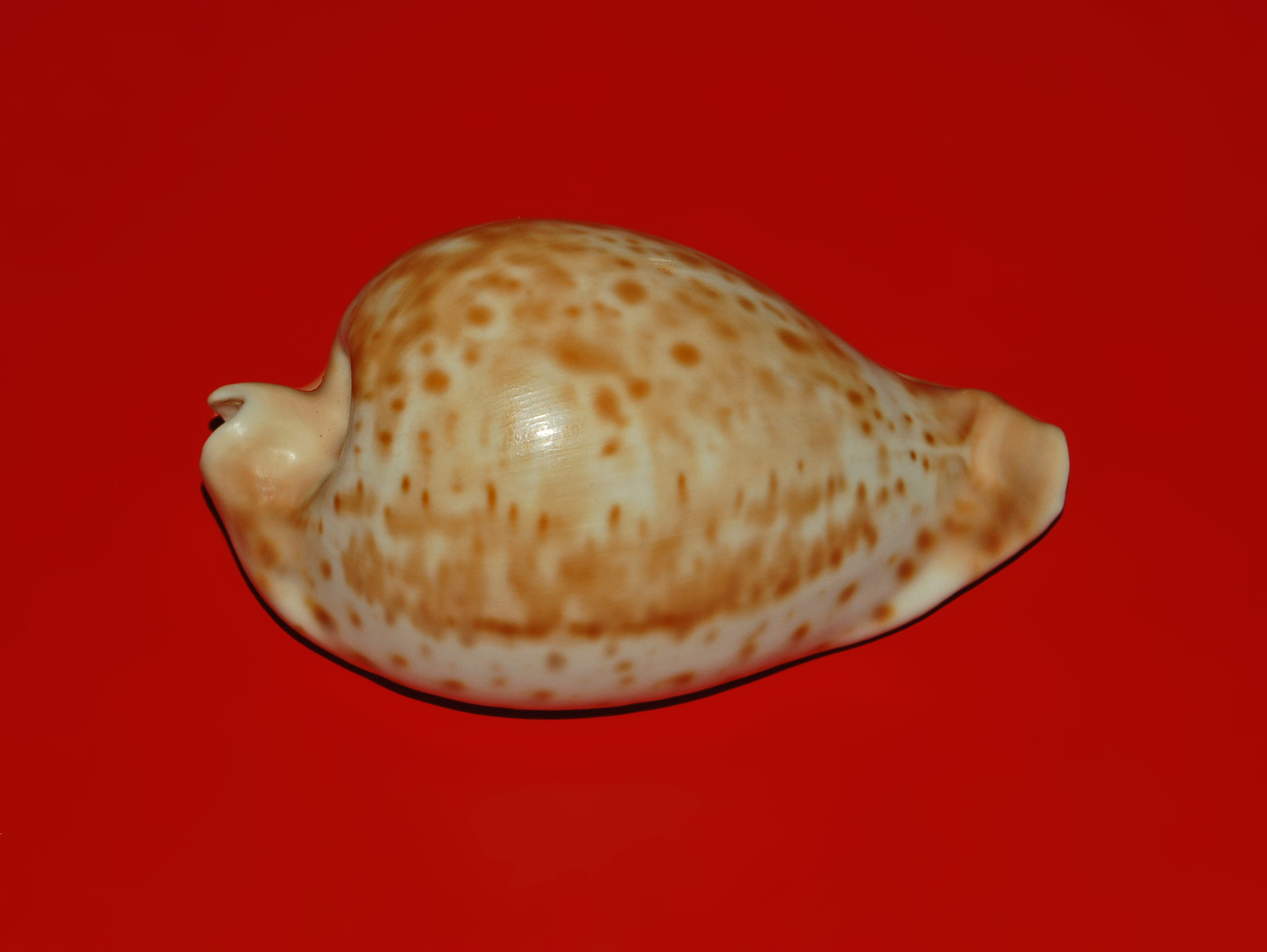
- A shell of Umbilia hesitata from Australia, dorsal view, anterior end towards the right

Scientific classification
- Kingdom: Animalia
- Phylum: Mollusca
- Class: Gastropoda
- Subclass: Caenogastropoda
- Order: Littorinimorpha
- Family: Cypraeidae
- Genus: Umbilia
- Species: U. hesitata

Binomial name
- Umbilia hesitata (Iredale, 1916)

Synonyms
- Cypraea hesitata Iredale, 1916 (basionym); Cypraea umbilicata Sowerby I, 1825 (invalid: junior homonym of Cypraea umbilicata Lightfoot, 1786 and C. umbilicata Dillwyn, 1823; Cypraea hesitata is a replacement name)

= Umbilia hesitata =

Species of gastropod

Umbilia hesitata, common name the umbilicate cowry or wonder cowry is a species of sea snail, a cowry, a marine gastropod mollusc in the family Cypraeidae, the cowries.

== Description ==
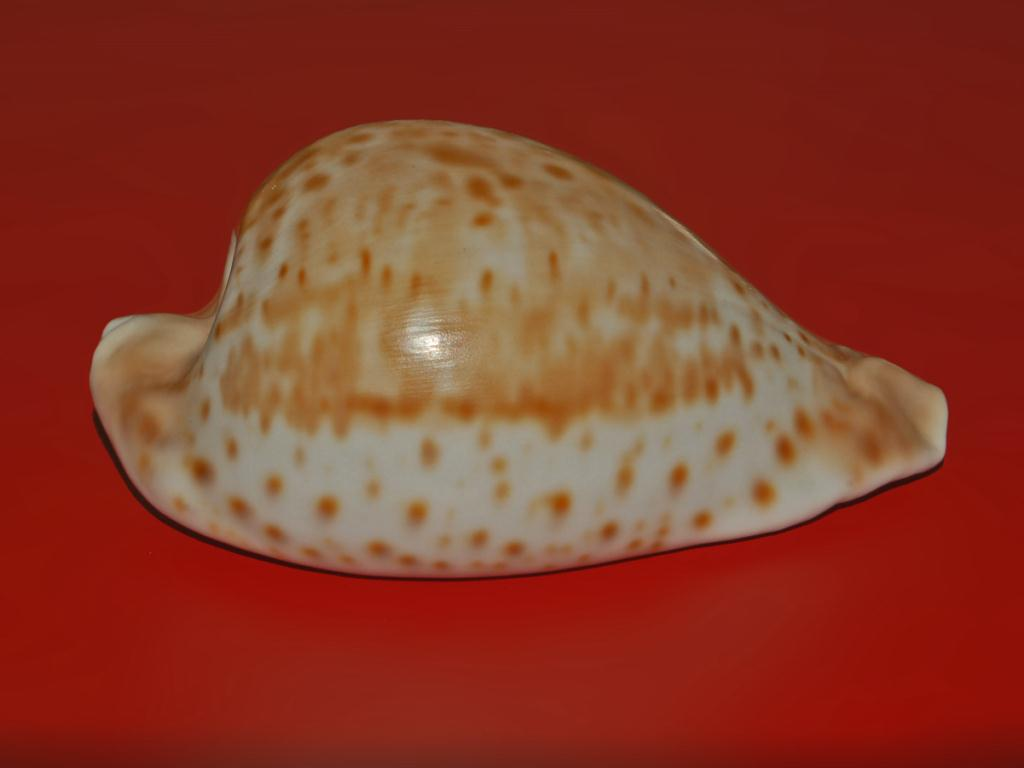
Umbilia hesitata, side view, anterior end towards the right

The shells of this uncommon species reach on average 75–100 millimetres (3.0–3.9 in) in length, with a maximum size of 120 millimetres (4.7 in) and a minimum size of 55 millimetres (2.2 in). The dorsal dome is smooth, round and appears almost inflated. The basic color of this cowry is white or pale brown or light pink, with many brown irregular small spots, especially close to the edges. The anterior and the posterior extremities are rostrate, with well-developed flanges, extended around the base. The base is mainly white, with a large sinuous aperture and small teeth. Females are smaller than males.

== Distribution ==
This species is widely distributed from South Australia to southern Queensland, mainly in the seas along Victoria, New South Wales and along northern and eastern Tasmania.

== Habitat ==
These cowries live in cold deep waters on the bottom sediment at about 100–200 metres (330–660 ft) of depth, where they are usually found by fishing. They likely feed on bryozoa or sponges. In parts of Tasmania, the species occurs in much shallower water in the subtidal zone.

== Subspecies ==
- Umbilia hesitata beddomei Schlinder, 1930 (dwarf form)
- Umbilia hesitata howelli Iredale, 1931 (albina form)
