= Rimula frenulata =

Scientific classification
- Kingdom: Animalia
- Phylum: Mollusca
- Class: Gastropoda
- Subclass: Vetigastropoda
- Order: Lepetellida
- Family: Fissurellidae
- Genus: Rimula
- Species: R. frenulata

Binomial name
- Rimula frenulata (Dall, 1889)

Species of gastropod

Rimula frenulata is a species of sea snail, a marine gastropod mollusk in the family Fissurellidae, the keyhole limpets.
