= Umbilia petilirostris =

Scientific classification
- Kingdom: Animalia
- Phylum: Mollusca
- Class: Gastropoda
- Subclass: Caenogastropoda
- Order: Littorinimorpha
- Family: Cypraeidae
- Genus: Umbilia
- Species: U. petilirostris

Binomial name
- Umbilia petilirostris Darragh, 2002

Species of gastropod

Umbilia petilirostris is a species of sea snail, a cowry, a marine gastropod mollusc in the family Cypraeidae, the cowries.
