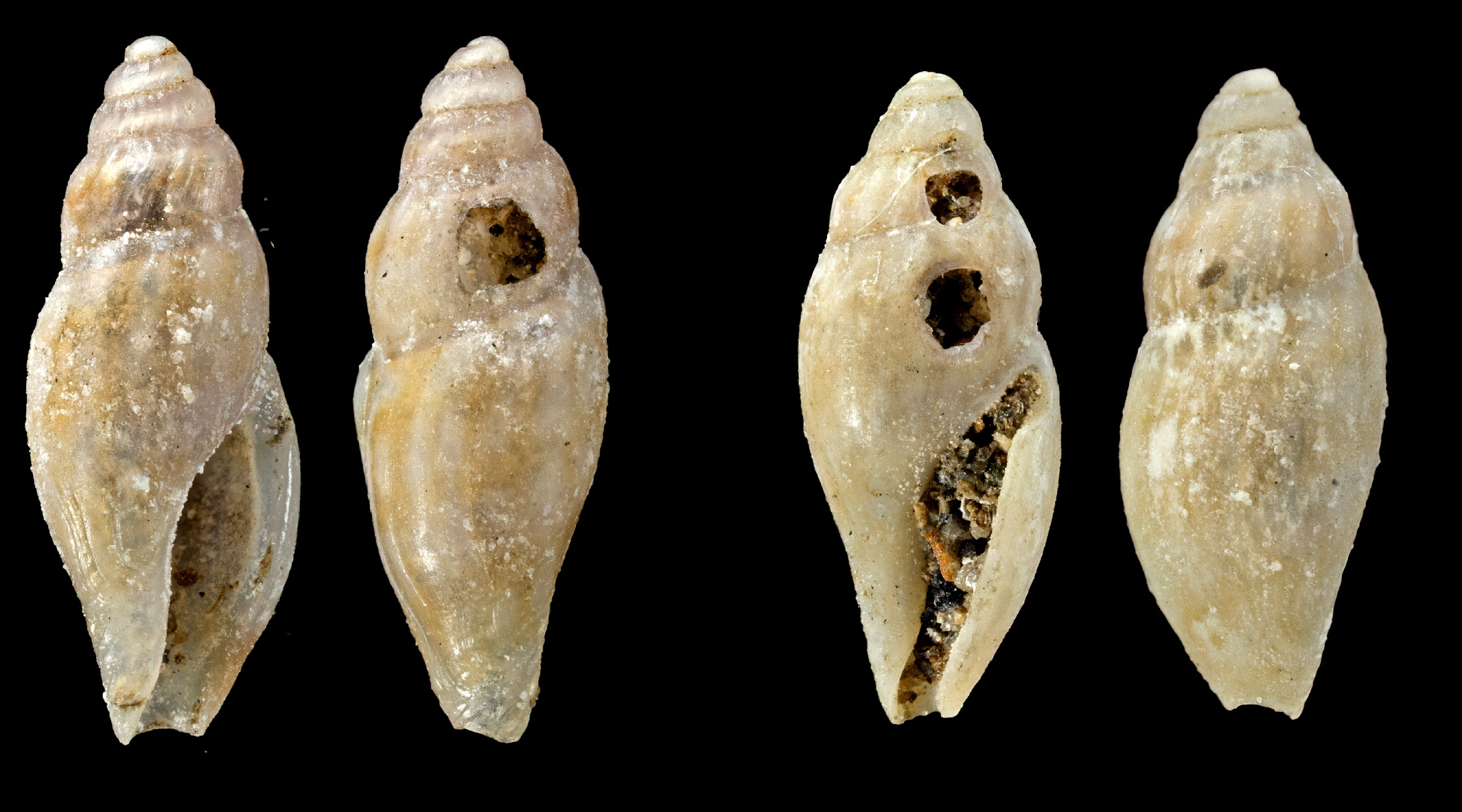
- Shell of Bactrocythara candeana (specimen at the Natural History Museum, London)

Scientific classification
- Kingdom: Animalia
- Phylum: Mollusca
- Class: Gastropoda
- Subclass: Caenogastropoda
- Order: Neogastropoda
- Superfamily: Conoidea
- Family: Mangeliidae
- Genus: Bactrocythara
- Species: B. candeana

Binomial name
- Bactrocythara candeana (d'Orbigny, 1847)

Synonyms
- Clathurella candeana d'Orbigny, 1847

= Bactrocythara candeana =

Species of gastropod

Bactrocythara candeana is a species of sea snail, a marine gastropod mollusk in the family Mangeliidae.

== Description ==
The length of the shell attains 4 mm.

The spire of the whitish shell is longitudinally plicate. The body whorl lacks sculpture except a few revolving lines at the base.

== Distribution ==
This marine species occurs off Guadeloupe; Martinique; on the Mid-Atlantic Ridge.
