= Bactrocythara agachada =

Scientific classification
- Kingdom: Animalia
- Phylum: Mollusca
- Class: Gastropoda
- Subclass: Caenogastropoda
- Order: Neogastropoda
- Superfamily: Conoidea
- Family: Mangeliidae
- Genus: Bactrocythara
- Species: B. agachada

Binomial name
- Bactrocythara agachada Rolan et al, 1994

Species of gastropod

Bactrocythara agachada is a species of sea snail, a marine gastropod mollusk in the family Mangeliidae.

== Description ==
The length of the shell of the holotype attains 4.2 mm.

== Distribution ==
This marine species occurs off Ghana and Ivory Coast, West Africa.
