= Bactrocythara cryera =

Scientific classification
- Kingdom: Animalia
- Phylum: Mollusca
- Class: Gastropoda
- Subclass: Caenogastropoda
- Order: Neogastropoda
- Superfamily: Conoidea
- Family: Mangeliidae
- Genus: Bactrocythara
- Species: B. cryera

Binomial name
- Bactrocythara cryera (Dall, 1927)

Synonyms
- Mangilia cryera Dall, 1927; Mangelia cryera (Dall, 1927)

Species of gastropod

Bactrocythara cryera is a species of sea snail, a marine gastropod mollusk in the family Mangeliidae.

== Description ==
The length of the shell attains 5 mm, its diameter 2.1 mm.

(Original description) The shell closely resembles Kurtzina crossata (Dall, 1927) but is thinner, more glassy, and averages smaller. It lacks any crowning at the suture and features a faint, pervasive spiral striation.

== Distribution ==
This marine species occurs in the Western Atlantic Ocean, mainly from Georgia to Florida, United States at depths between 538 m and 805 m
