= Rimula astricta =

Scientific classification
- Kingdom: Animalia
- Phylum: Mollusca
- Class: Gastropoda
- Subclass: Vetigastropoda
- Order: Lepetellida
- Family: Fissurellidae
- Subfamily: Rimulinae
- Genus: Rimula
- Species: R. astricta

Binomial name
- Rimula astricta McLean, 1970

Species of gastropod

Rimula astricta is a species of sea snail, a marine gastropod mollusk in the family Fissurellidae, the keyhole limpets and slit limpets.
