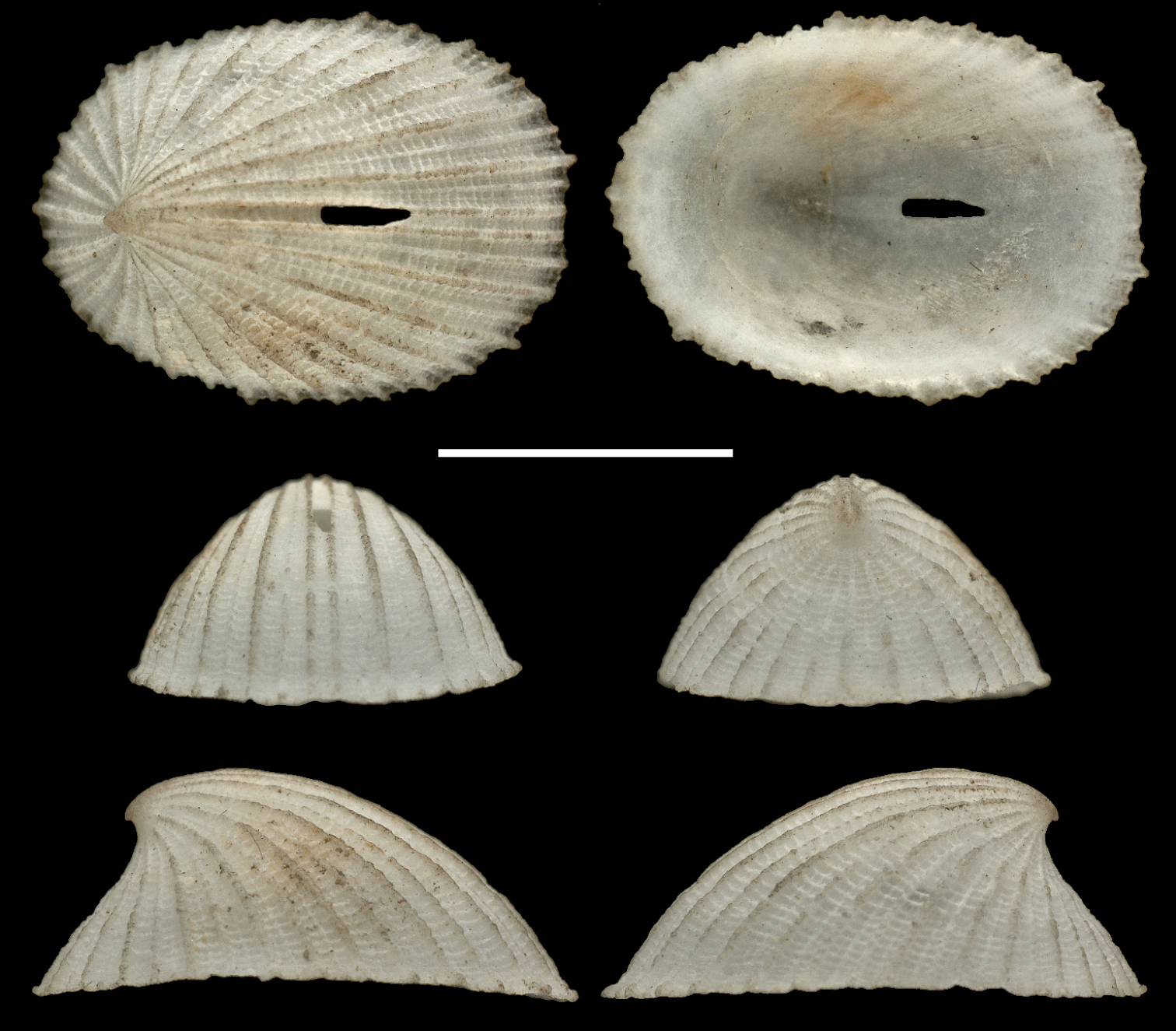

Scientific classification
- Kingdom: Animalia
- Phylum: Mollusca
- Class: Gastropoda
- Subclass: Vetigastropoda
- Order: Lepetellida
- Family: Fissurellidae
- Subfamily: Rimulinae
- Genus: Rimula
- Species: R. rhips

Binomial name
- Rimula rhips Herbert & Kilburn, 1986

= Rimula rhips =

Species of gastropod

Rimula rhips is a species of sea snail, a marine gastropod mollusk in the family Fissurellidae, the keyhole limpets and slit limpets.
