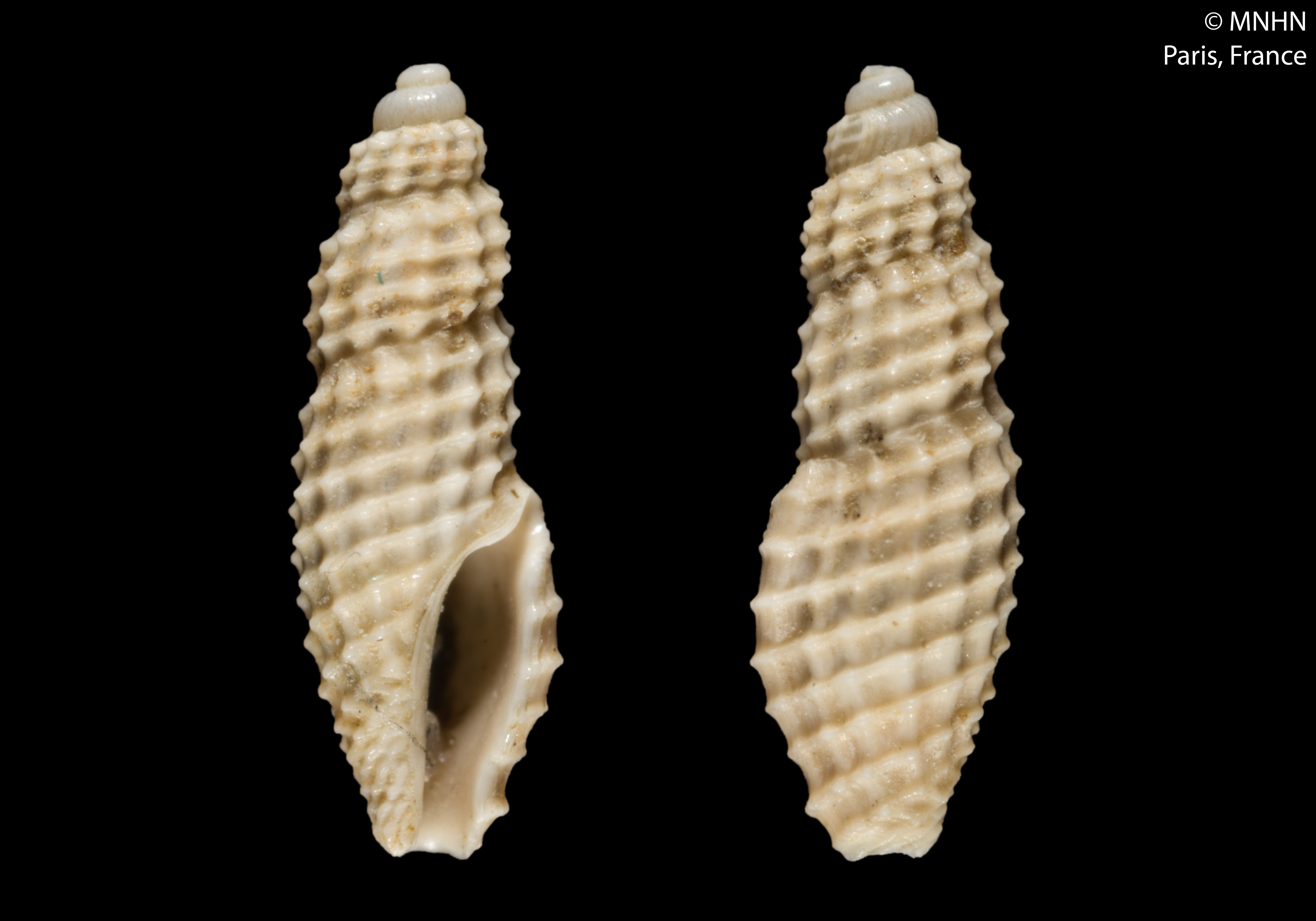
- Shell of Bactrocythara haullevillei (3D reconstruction of syntype specimen, MNHN-IM-2000-2989)

Scientific classification
- Kingdom: Animalia
- Phylum: Mollusca
- Class: Gastropoda
- Subclass: Caenogastropoda
- Order: Neogastropoda
- Superfamily: Conoidea
- Family: Mangeliidae
- Genus: Bactrocythara
- Species: B. haullevillei

Binomial name
- Bactrocythara haullevillei (Dautzenberg, 1912)

Synonyms
- Clathurella haullevillei Dautzenberg, 1912

= Bactrocythara haullevillei =

Species of gastropod

Bactrocythara haullevillei is a species of sea snail, a marine gastropod mollusk in the family Mangeliidae.

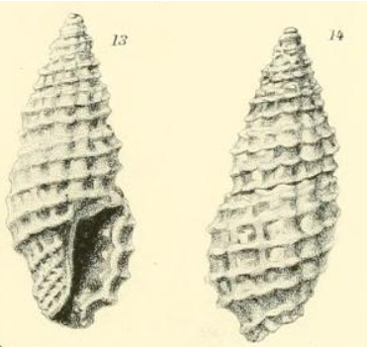
Shell of Bactrocythara haullevillei, illustrated in Dautzenberg (1912), plate 1, figures 13-14.

== Description ==
The shell is small, solid, and narrowly elongate, reaching a length of about 4–5 mm. The spire is relatively high and consists of six whorls separated by a distinct suture. The first three whorls form the protoconch; the two earliest are smooth and convex, while the third bears very fine axial riblets below the suture.

The teleoconch whorls are regularly sculptured with a cancellate pattern formed by strong axial ribs and spiral cords. On the last whorl there are about twelve axial ribs, intersected by approximately twelve spiral cords, producing quadrangular meshes with slightly nodulose intersections. The body whorl is attenuated toward the base but not constricted.

The aperture is elongate, with a wide and deeply notched anal sinus and a very short, open siphonal canal. The columella is nearly straight and bears a strong callus above. The outer lip is thickened, with a slight internal sinuosity. The shell colour is uniformly fawn; a colourless variety, Bactrocythara haullevillei albida, is entirely white.

== Distribution ==
This marine species occurs in the eastern Atlantic Ocean, from Guinea, West Africa, to the estuary of the Congo River, including records from the Gulf of Guinea.

== Subspecies ==
- Bactrocythara haullevillei albida Dautzenberg, 1912 – an entirely white colour form.
