= Umbilia capricornica =

Scientific classification
- Kingdom: Animalia
- Phylum: Mollusca
- Class: Gastropoda
- Subclass: Caenogastropoda
- Order: Littorinimorpha
- Family: Cypraeidae
- Genus: Umbilia
- Species: U. capricornica

Binomial name
- Umbilia capricornica Lorenz, 1989

Species of gastropod

Umbilia capricornica is a species of sea snail, a cowry, a marine gastropod mollusk in the family Cypraeidae, the cowries.
