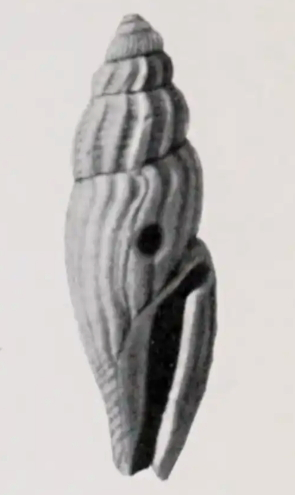
- Shell of † Bactrocythara obtusa

Scientific classification
- Kingdom: Animalia
- Phylum: Mollusca
- Class: Gastropoda
- Subclass: Caenogastropoda
- Order: Neogastropoda
- Superfamily: Conoidea
- Family: Mangeliidae
- Genus: Bactrocythara
- Species: †B. obtusa

Binomial name
- †Bactrocythara obtusa (R.J.L. Guppy, 1896

Synonyms
- † Cythara obtusa R.J.L. Guppy, 1896

= Bactrocythara obtusa =

Extinct species of gastropod

Bactrocythara obtusa is an extinct species of sea snail, a marine gastropod mollusk in the family Mangeliidae.

== Description ==
The length of its shell reached 5.4 mm and its diameter 1.9 mm.

The outline, nucleus, and aperture are conform to the description given for the genus. The sculpture consists of narrow axial ribs, numbering 12 to 14 on the penultimate whorl, which become strongly hooked over the area corresponding to the anal fasciole. Between these ribs lie spiral cords that, on the body whorl of adult shells, almost or completely disappear, leaving the axial elements dominant. The columella is sculptured with spiral threads that continue the spiral ornamentation internally.

== Distribution ==
This extinct species was found in the Pliocene strata of Jamaica. It existed from 3.6 to 2.588 Ma.
