= Bactrocythara cubana =

Scientific classification
- Kingdom: Animalia
- Phylum: Mollusca
- Class: Gastropoda
- Subclass: Caenogastropoda
- Order: Neogastropoda
- Superfamily: Conoidea
- Family: Mangeliidae
- Genus: Bactrocythara
- Species: B. cubana

Binomial name
- Bactrocythara cubana Espinosa, Ortea & Moro, 2017

Species of gastropod

Bactrocythara cubana is a species of sea snail, a marine gastropod mollusk in the family Mangeliidae.

== Distribution ==
This marine species occurs Cuba.
