= Vexillum pseudoschafferi =

Scientific classification
- Kingdom: Animalia
- Phylum: Mollusca
- Class: Gastropoda
- Subclass: Caenogastropoda
- Order: Neogastropoda
- Superfamily: Turbinelloidea
- Family: Costellariidae
- Genus: Vexillum
- Species: †V. pseudoschafferi

Binomial name
- †Vexillum pseudoschafferi Biskupič, 2020

Species of gastropod

Vexillum pseudoschafferi is an extinct species of sea snail, a marine gastropod mollusk, in the family Costellariidae, the ribbed miters.

== Description ==
The length of the shell attains 11.7 mm, its diameter 4.4 mm.

== Distribution ==
Fossils of this marine species were found in middle Miocene strata of the Vienna Basin in Slovakia.
