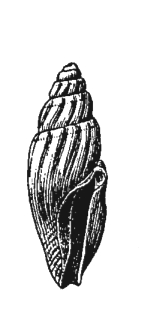
- Original image of a shell of Bactrocythara asarca

Scientific classification
- Kingdom: Animalia
- Phylum: Mollusca
- Class: Gastropoda
- Subclass: Caenogastropoda
- Order: Neogastropoda
- Superfamily: Conoidea
- Family: Mangeliidae
- Genus: Bactrocythara
- Species: B. asarca

Binomial name
- Bactrocythara asarca (W. H. Dall & C. T. Simpson, 1901)

Synonyms
- Cythara asarca (Dall & Simpson,1901); Mangilia asarca Dall & Simpson, 1901

= Bactrocythara asarca =

Species of mollusc

Bactrocythara asarca, common name the elegant mangelia, is a species of sea snail, a marine gastropod mollusk in the family Mangeliidae.

== Description ==
The length of the shell attains 6 mm, its diameter 1.5 mm.

(Original descriptio,) The minute shell is white, or with faint yellowish flammules. It contains six brilliantly polished, slender whorls. The nepionic shell is small, depressed and smooth. The subsequent whorls show about ten axial riblets, slightly flexuous near the suture and becoming obsolete anteriorly. The peripheral part of the body whorl is smooth or destitute of spiral sculpture, which on the base and the siphonal canal is well developed and consists of fine striation. The notch is short, subcircular, leaving no fasciole. The outer lip is slightly thickened, not lirate within.

== Distribution ==
This species occurs in the Gulf of Mexico and the Caribbean Sea; in Puerto Rico at depths between 46 m and 101 m.
