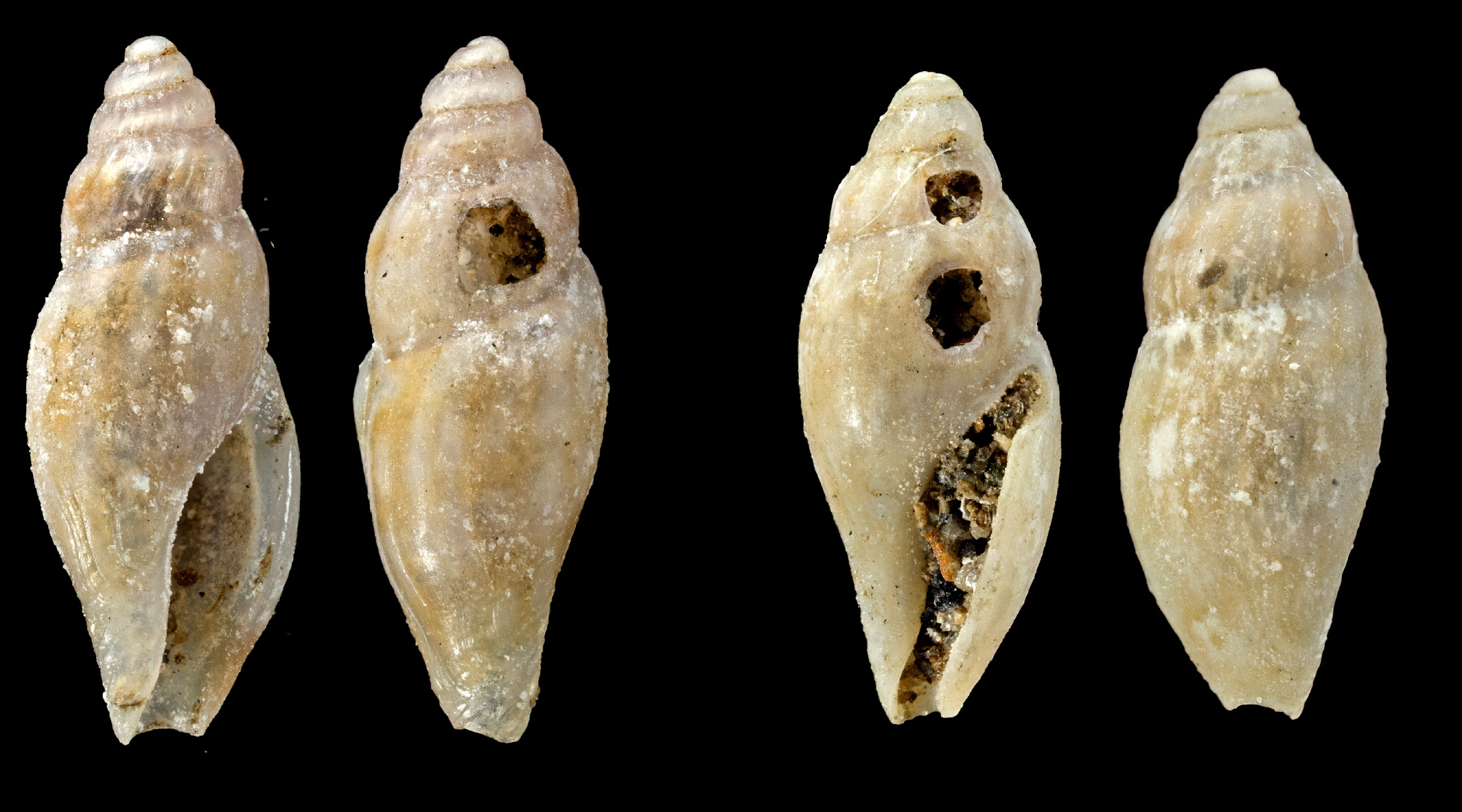
- Bactrocythara candeana

Scientific classification
- Kingdom: Animalia
- Phylum: Mollusca
- Class: Gastropoda
- Subclass: Caenogastropoda
- Order: Neogastropoda
- Superfamily: Conoidea
- Family: Mangeliidae
- Genus: Bactrocythara; Woodring, 1928

Type species
- Bactrocythara obtusa Guppy, R.J.L. in Guppy, R.J.L. & W.H. Dall, 1896

Species
- See text

= Bactrocythara =

Genus of gastropods

Bactrocythara is a genus of small sea snails, marine gastropod mollusks in the family Mangeliidae.

== General characteristics ==
(Original description) The small shell is very slender. The nucleus has a small tip and a deeply submerged apex that consists of three rapidly enlarging whorls; the last one and a half whorls are sculptured with closely spaced, protractive, curved axial riblets. The aperture is long and very narrow. An anterior canal is not differentiated, and the base is moderately emarginate. The outer lip is varicose, and the base bears a broad, shallow stromboid notch. The anal notch is broad and deep, with its apex expanded. The parietal callus is thickened adjacent to the notch, and the edge of the inner lip is detached.

The shell sculpture consists of narrow axial ribs that are strongly bent at the anal fasciole, together with weak spiral cords that lie between the ribs. The combination of hooked ribs, a very narrow aperture, a deep anal notch, and a large nucleus is characteristic of Bactrocythara.

== Species ==
Species within the genus Bactrocythara include:

- Bactrocythara agachada Rolán, Otero-Schmitt & Fernandes, 1994
- Bactrocythara asarca (Dall & Simpson, 1901)
- † Bactrocythara ascara (W.H. Dall & C.T. Simpson, 1900) (probably a misspelling of Bactrocythara asarca (Dall & Simpson, 1901) )
- Bactrocythara candeana (d'Orbigny, 1847)
- Bactrocythara cryera (Dall, 1927)
- Bactrocythara cubana Espinosa, Ortea & Moro, 2017
- Bactrocythara haullevillei (Dautzenberg, 1912)
- Bactrocythara labiosa (Smith E. A., 1872)
- † Bactrocythara obtusa (R.J.L. Guppy, 1896)
- † Bactrocythara pascaleae Landau, Van Dingenen & Ceulemans, 2020
- † Bactrocythara tehuantepecensis Perrilliat, 1973 (uncertain > unassessed)

Species brought into synonymy

- Bactrocythara thielei J. Knudsen, 1952: synonym of Bactrocythara labiosa (E.A. Smith, 1872)
