= Bactrocythara pascaleae =

Scientific classification
- Kingdom: Animalia
- Phylum: Mollusca
- Class: Gastropoda
- Subclass: Caenogastropoda
- Order: Neogastropoda
- Superfamily: Conoidea
- Family: Mangeliidae
- Genus: Bactrocythara
- Species: †B. pascaleae

Binomial name
- †Bactrocythara pascaleae Landau, Van Dingenen & Ceulemans, 2020

Extinct species of gastropod

Bactrocythara pascaleae is an extinct species of sea snail, a marine gastropod mollusk in the family Mangeliidae.

== Description ==
The length of the shell of the holotype attains 2.2 mm, its diameter 730 μm.

== Distribution ==
This extinct species was found in upper Miocene strata in Maine-et-Loire, France.
