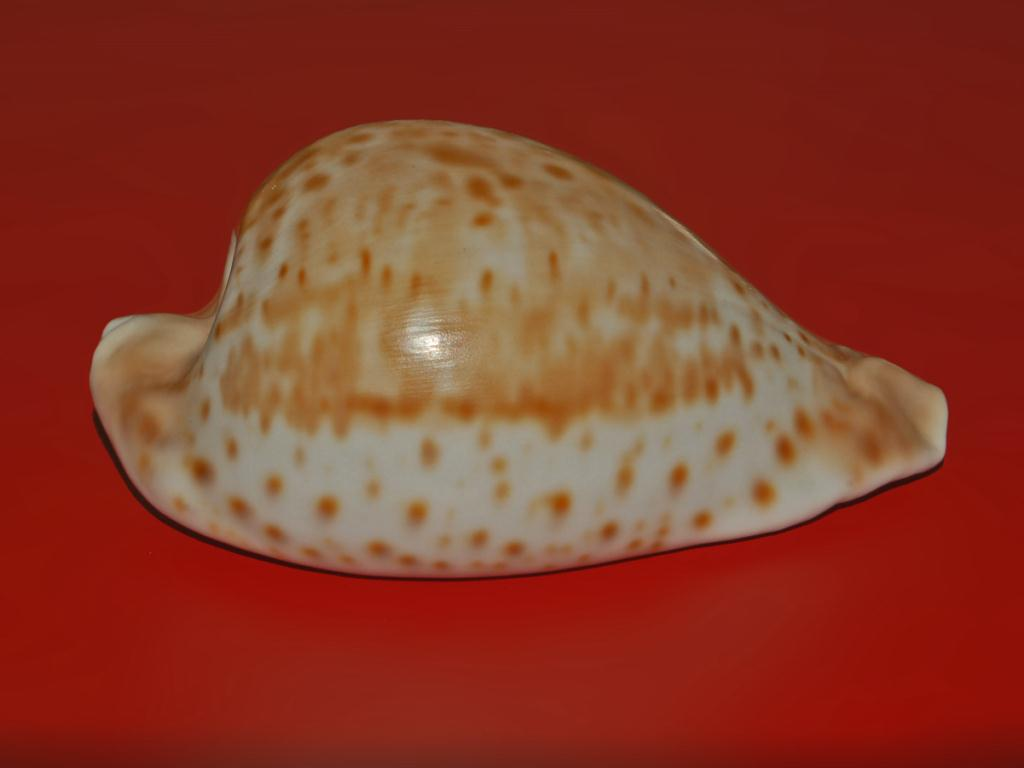
- Umbilia hesitata shell

Scientific classification
- Kingdom: Animalia
- Phylum: Mollusca
- Class: Gastropoda
- Subclass: Caenogastropoda
- Order: Littorinimorpha
- Family: Cypraeidae
- Genus: Umbilia; Jousseaume, 1884

= Umbilia =

Genus of gastropods

Umbilia is a genus of sea snails, marine gastropod molluscs in the family Cypraeidae, the cowries.

== Species ==
Species within the genus Umbilia include:

- Umbilia armeniaca Verco, 1912
- Umbilia capricornica Lorenz, 1989
- Umbilia hesitata Jousseaume, 1884
- Umbilia oriettae Lorenz & Massiglia, 2005
- Umbilia petilirostris Darragh, 2002
