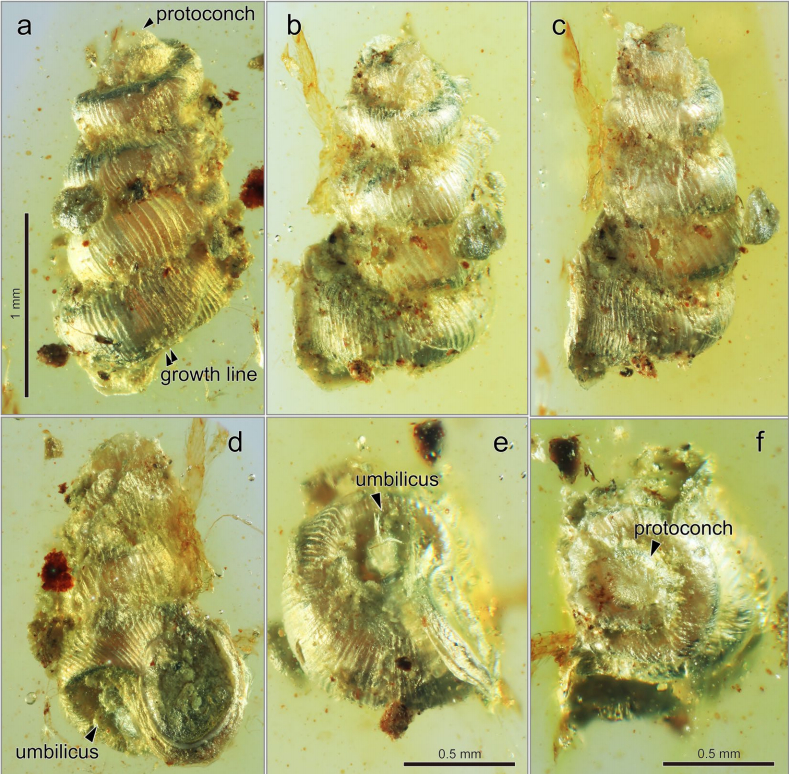
- Holotype specimen of Euthema hesoana

Scientific classification
- Domain: Eukaryota
- Kingdom: Animalia
- Phylum: Mollusca
- Class: Gastropoda
- Subclass: Caenogastropoda
- Order: Architaenioglossa
- Superfamily: Cyclophoroidea
- Family: Diplommatinidae
- Genus: †Euthema; Yu, Wang & Pan, 2018

Species
- See text

Synonyms
- Paleodiplommatina Bullis et al., 2020; Xenostoma Bullis et al., 2020

= Euthema =

Euthema Temporal range: Albian-early Cenomanian 110–99 Ma

Extinct genus of gastropods

Euthema is a fossil genus of minute land snails with an operculum, terrestrial gastropod molluscs in the family Diplommatinidae from the Cretaceous Burmese and Hkamti ambers.

== Species ==
As of 2021, 8 species are placed into Euthema:

- E. annae Balashov, 2020: described from the Cretaceous Burmese amber, the species was first described in the paper published online by "Cretaceous Research" on October 16, 2020, which qualifies as a nomenclatural act under Article 8.5 of the ICZN when registered in ZooBank, though the final version of the paper was published and printed in February 2021.
- E. dilatata (Yu, 2020), originally described as Truncatellina dilatatus
- E. hesoana Asato & Hirano in Hirano et al., 2019
- E. lophopleura (Bullis, Herhold, Czekanski-Moir, Grimaldi & Rundell, 2020), originally described in the new genus Xenostoma
- E. myanmarica Balashov, 2021 - species from Hkamti amber
- E. naggsi Yu, Wang & Pan, 2018, type species
- E. spelomphalos (Bullis, Herhold, Czekanski-Moir, Grimaldi & Rundell, 2020), originally described in the new genus Paleodiplommatina
- E. truncatellina Balashov, Perkovsky & Vasilenko, 2020

== Etymology ==
Euthema truncatellina is named after the extant genus Truncatellina (Stylommatophora), which has a similar shell, acknowledging the convergence in the different lineages of gastropods on land.

== Description ==
Euthema annae has a shell which is almost cylindrical with 6 weakly convex whorls, ribbed, with strong constriction. Aperture almost heart-shaped with parietal inclusion. Umbilicus narrow. Periumbilical keel weak. Height of shell 2 mm (0.079 in) tall and 1–1.1 mm (0.039–0.043 in) wide.

E. myanmarica has a shell which is almost cylindrical, comprising 6 moderately convex whorls, ribbed, with weak constriction. The aperture is oval and the umbilicus wide, with a strong periumbilical keel. The shells are 2 mm (0.079 in) and 0.9 mm (0.035 in) wide.

E. truncatellina has a shell which is almost cylindrical, comprising 6.5 moderately convex whorls, ribbed, with weak constriction. The aperture is circular, the umbilicus narrow, and the periumbilical keel is absent. The shells are 1.7 mm (0.067 in) and 0.9 mm (0.035 in) wide.

== Links ==
- MolluscaBase - Euthema
