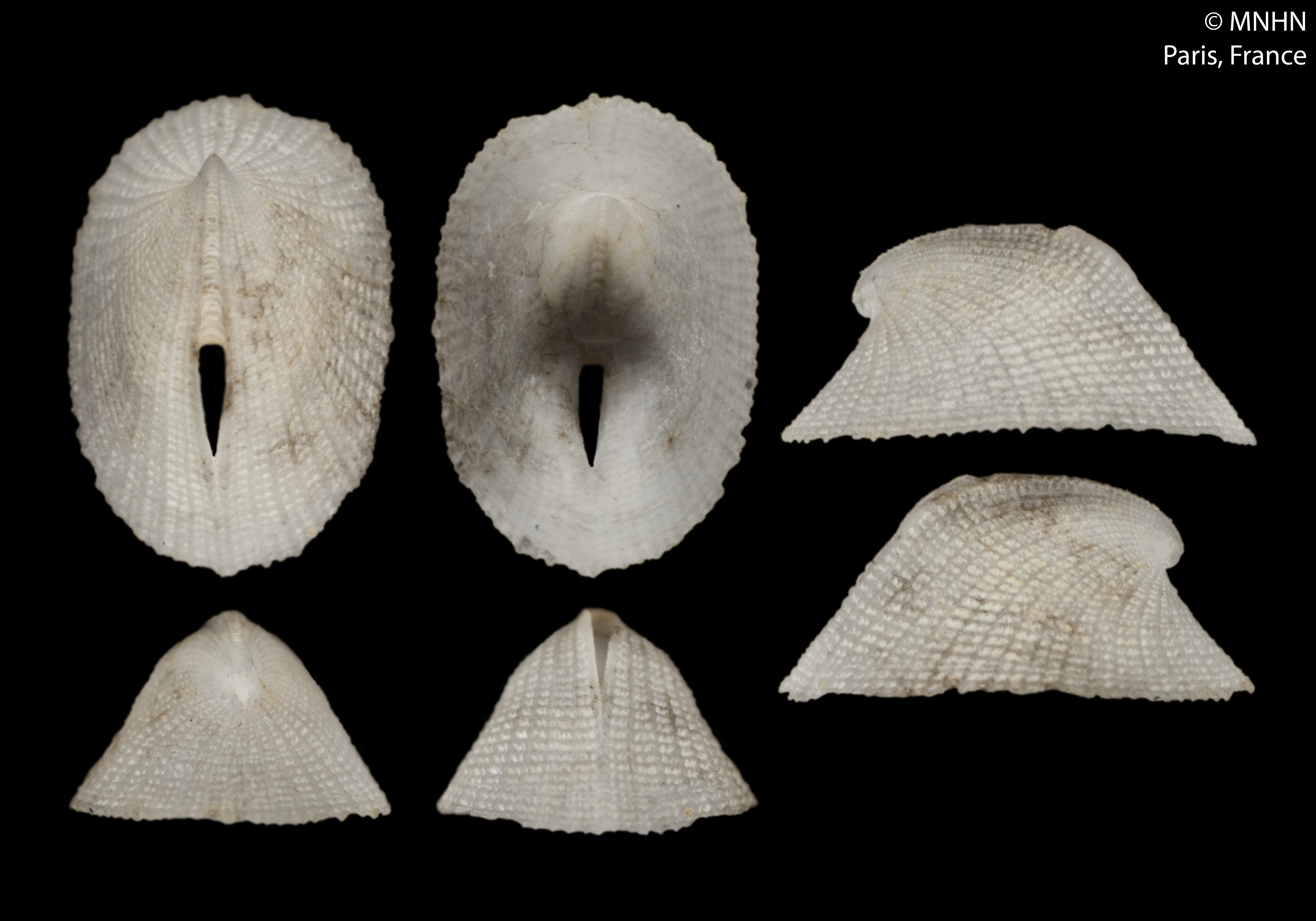
- Shell of Rimula leptarcis (holotype at MNHN, Paris)

Scientific classification
- Kingdom: Animalia
- Phylum: Mollusca
- Class: Gastropoda
- Subclass: Vetigastropoda
- Order: Lepetellida
- Superfamily: Fissurelloidea
- Family: Fissurellidae
- Subfamily: Rimulinae
- Genus: Rimula; Lowe, 1852

Type species
- † Emarginula blainvillii DeFrance, M.J.L., 1827

Synonyms
- Emarginula (Rimula) Defrance, 1827; Rimularia Bronn, 1838 (unjustified emendation of Rimula Defrance, 1827)

= Rimula (gastropod) =

Genus of gastropods

Rimula is a genus of sea snails, marine gastropod mollusks in the family Fissurellidae, the keyhole limpets.

The name of the genus is a diminutive of "rime", a fissure.

== Description ==
The shell is thin and cancellated, with a perforation near the anterior margin.

== Species ==
Species within the genus Rimula include:

- Rimula aequisculpta Dall, 1927
- Rimula astricta McLean, 1970
- † Rimula blainvillii (Defrance, 1825)
- † Rimula bonneti Cossmann, 1907
- Rimula californiana Berry, 1964
- Rimula dorriae Pérez Farfante, 1947
- † Rimula dubia (Defrance, 1819)
- Rimula escondida Poppe & Tagaro, 2020
- Rimula frenulata (Dall, 1889)
- † Rimula gaasensis Lozouet, 1999
- † Rimula laubrierei Cossmann, 1888
- Rimula leptarcis Simone & Cunha, 2014
- † Rimula lobilloensis Landau & Mulder, 2020
- Rimula mariei Crosse, 1866
- Rimula mexicana Berry, 1969
- Rimula pycnonema Pilsbry, 1943
- Rimula navis Poppe & Tagaro, 2020
- † Rimula plateaui Cossmann, 1896
- Rimula pycnonema Pilsbry, 1943
- Rimula rhips Herbert & Kilburn, 1986

Species brought into synonymy

- Rimula asturiana Fischer, 1882: synonym of Cranopsis asturiana (P. Fischer, 1882)
- Rimula carinifera Schepman, 1908: synonym of Cranopsis carinifera (Schepman, 1908)
- Rimula cumingii Adams, 1853: synonym of Cranopsis cumingii (Adams, 1853)
- Rimula exquisita Adams, 1853: synonym of Puncturella exquisita (A. Adams, 1853) (original combination)
- Rimula galeata Gould, 1846: synonym of Puncturella galeata (Gould, 1846)
- Rimula granulata Seguenza, 1862: synonym of Cranopsis granulata (Seguenza, 1862)
- Rimula verrieri Crosse, 1871: synonym of Cranopsis verrieri (Crosse, 1871)

Species inquirenda

- Rimula carinata Adams, 1853
- Rimula cognata Gould, 1852
- Rimula echinata Gould, 1859
- Rimula propinqua Adams, 1853
