= Fissurisepta =

Scientific classification
- Kingdom: Animalia
- Phylum: Mollusca
- Class: Gastropoda
- Subclass: Vetigastropoda
- Order: Lepetellida
- Family: Fissurellidae
- Subfamily: Emarginulinae
- Genus: Fissurisepta; Seguenza, 1863

Genus of gastropods

Fissurisepta is a genus of keyhole limpets, marine gastropod mollusc in the family Fissurellidae.

== Species ==
Species within the genus Fissurisepta include:

- Fissurisepta enderbyensis (Powell, 1958)
- Fissurisepta fumarium (Hedley, 1911)
- Fissurisepta granulosa Jeffreys, 1883
- Fissurisepta manawatawhia Powell, 1937
- Fissurisepta onychoides Herbert & Kilburn, 1986
- Fissurisepta oxia (Watson, 1883)
- Fissurisepta pacifica (Cowan, 1969)
- Fissurisepta tenuicula (Dall, 1927)

Species brought into synonymy

- Fissurisepta antarctica Egorova, 1972: synonym of Cornisepta antarctica (Egorova, 1972)
- Fissurisepta crossei (Dautzenberg & H. Fischer, 1896): synonym of Cornisepta crossei (Dautzenberg & H. Fischer, 1896)
- Fissurisepta festiva: synonym of Cornisepta festiva Crozier 1966
- Fissurisepta joschristiaensis Drivas & Jay, 1985: synonym of Puncturella christiaensi Kilburn, 1978
- Fissurisepta microphyma Dautzenberg & Fischer, 1896: synonym of Cornisepta microphyma (Dautzenberg & Fischer, 1896)
- Fissurisepta profundi (Jeffreys, 1877): synonym of Profundisepta profundi (Jeffreys, 1877)
- Fissurisepta rostrata: synonym of Cornisepta rostrata (Seguenza, 1864)
