= A. crenulatus =

A. crenulatus may refer to:

- Abacetus crenulatus, a ground beetle found in West Africa
- Acus crenulatus, a synonym of Oxymeris crenulata, a sea snail found in the Red Sea and the Indian and Pacific Oceans
- Adeuomphalus crenulatus, a sea snail found off New Zealand
- Arctus crenulatus, a synonym of Scyllarus arctus, a slipper lobster found in the Mediterranean Sea and the eastern Atlantic Ocean
