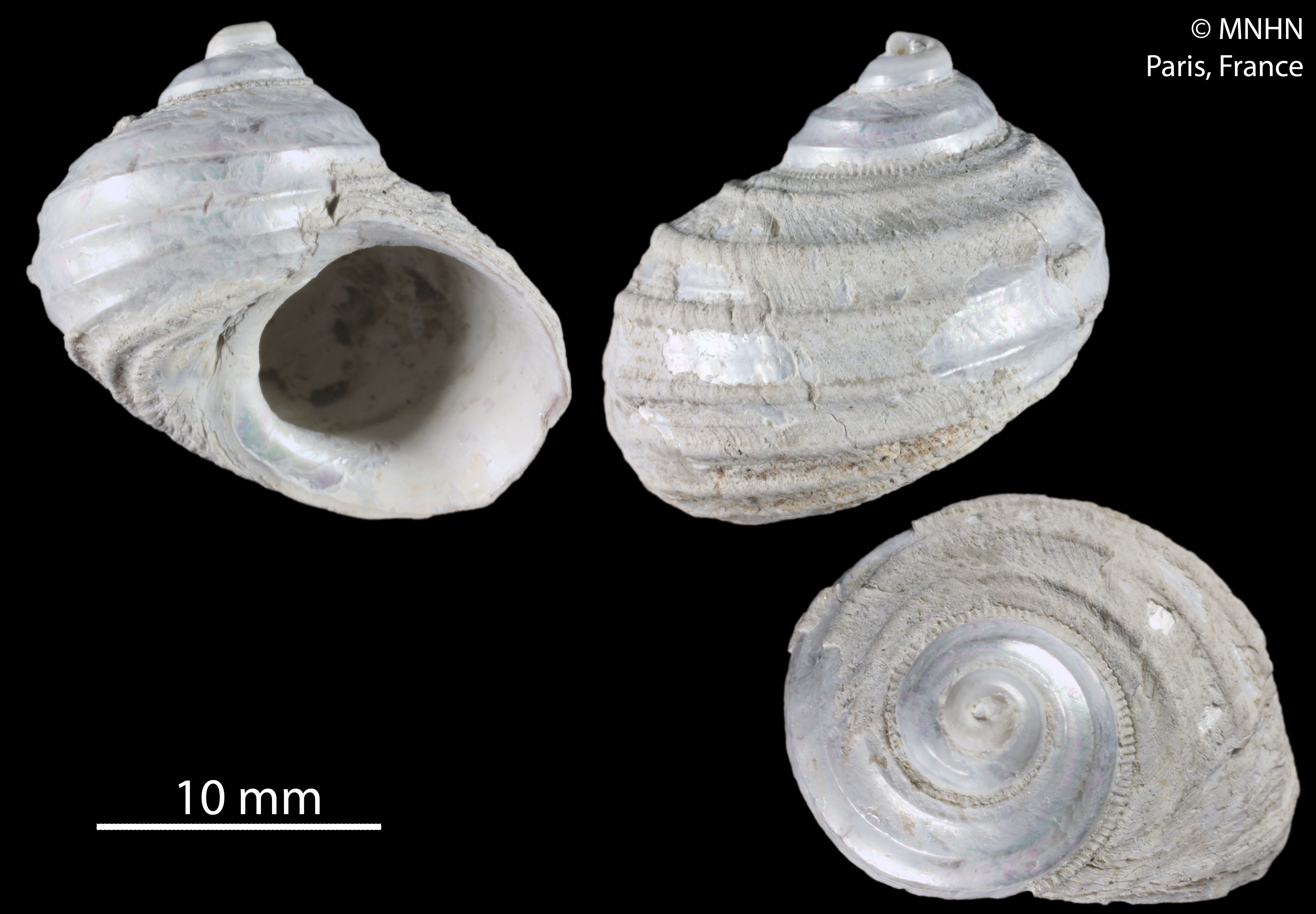
- Shell of Cataegis finkli (paratype at MNHN, Paris)

Scientific classification
- Kingdom: Animalia
- Phylum: Mollusca
- Class: Gastropoda
- Subclass: Vetigastropoda
- Superfamily: Seguenzioidea
- Family: Cataegidae
- Genus: Cataegis
- Species: C. finkli

Binomial name
- Cataegis finkli (Petuch, 1987)

Synonyms
- Cataegis toreuta McLean & Quinn, 1987; Homalopoma finkli Petuch, 1987; Conus tristensis Petuch, E.J., 1987

= Cataegis finkli =

Species of gastropod

Cataegis finkli is a species of sea snail, a marine gastropod mollusk in the family Cataegidae.

== Description ==
Original description: "Shell very large for genus, wide, inflated, turbinate in shape; spire narrow in proportion to shell width, elevated; body whorl ornamented with 8 large, well-developed, raised cords; spire whorls ornamented with 3 cords; outer layer of shell rough-textured, light brown in color; inner layer of shell nacreous with nacre showing through thin areas on spire and early whorls; outer lip and aperture flaring; columella thickened, nacreous, partially covered with white shelly layer; interior of aperture nacreous, iridescent; columella with one small tooth."

The size of the shell varies between 25 mm and 37 mm.

== Distribution ==
Locus typicus: "Off Puerto Cabello, Golfo de Triste, Venezuela."

This species occurs in the Caribbean Sea off Venezuela and Colombia; in the Gulf of Mexico off Florida.
