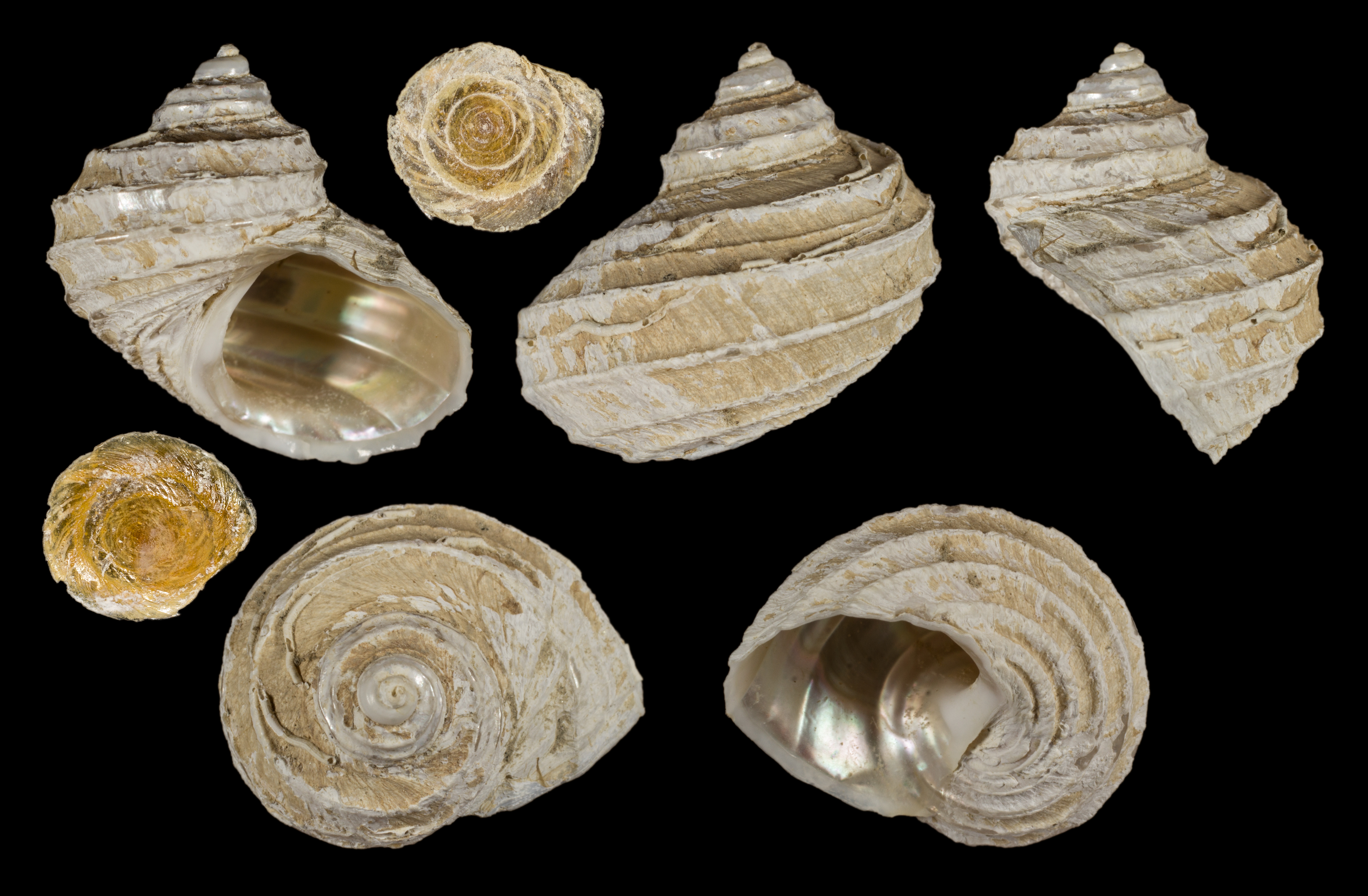
- Shell of Cataegis celebesensis (holotype at MNHN, Paris)

Scientific classification
- Kingdom: Animalia
- Phylum: Mollusca
- Class: Gastropoda
- Subclass: Vetigastropoda
- Superfamily: Seguenzioidea
- Family: Cataegidae
- Genus: Cataegis
- Species: C. celebesensis

Binomial name
- Cataegis celebesensis McLean & Quinn, 1987

= Cataegis celebesensis =

Species of gastropod

Cataegis celebesensis is a species of sea snail, a marine gastropod mollusk in the family Cataegidae.

== Description ==
The height of the shell attains 20.5 mm (0.81 in).

== Distribution ==
This marine species is found in the Makassar Strait, Indonesia.
