= Adeuomphalus ammoniformis =

Scientific classification
- Kingdom: Animalia
- Phylum: Mollusca
- Class: Gastropoda
- Subclass: Vetigastropoda
- Superfamily: Seguenzioidea
- Family: incertae sedis
- Genus: Adeuomphalus
- Species: A. ammoniformis

Binomial name
- Adeuomphalus ammoniformis (Seguenza, 1876)

Species of gastropod

Adeuomphalus ammoniformis is a species of sea snail, a marine gastropod mollusc unassigned to family in the superfamily Seguenzioidea.

== Description ==
The shell grows to a height of 2 mm.

== Distribution ==
This species occurs in the Mediterranean Sea.
