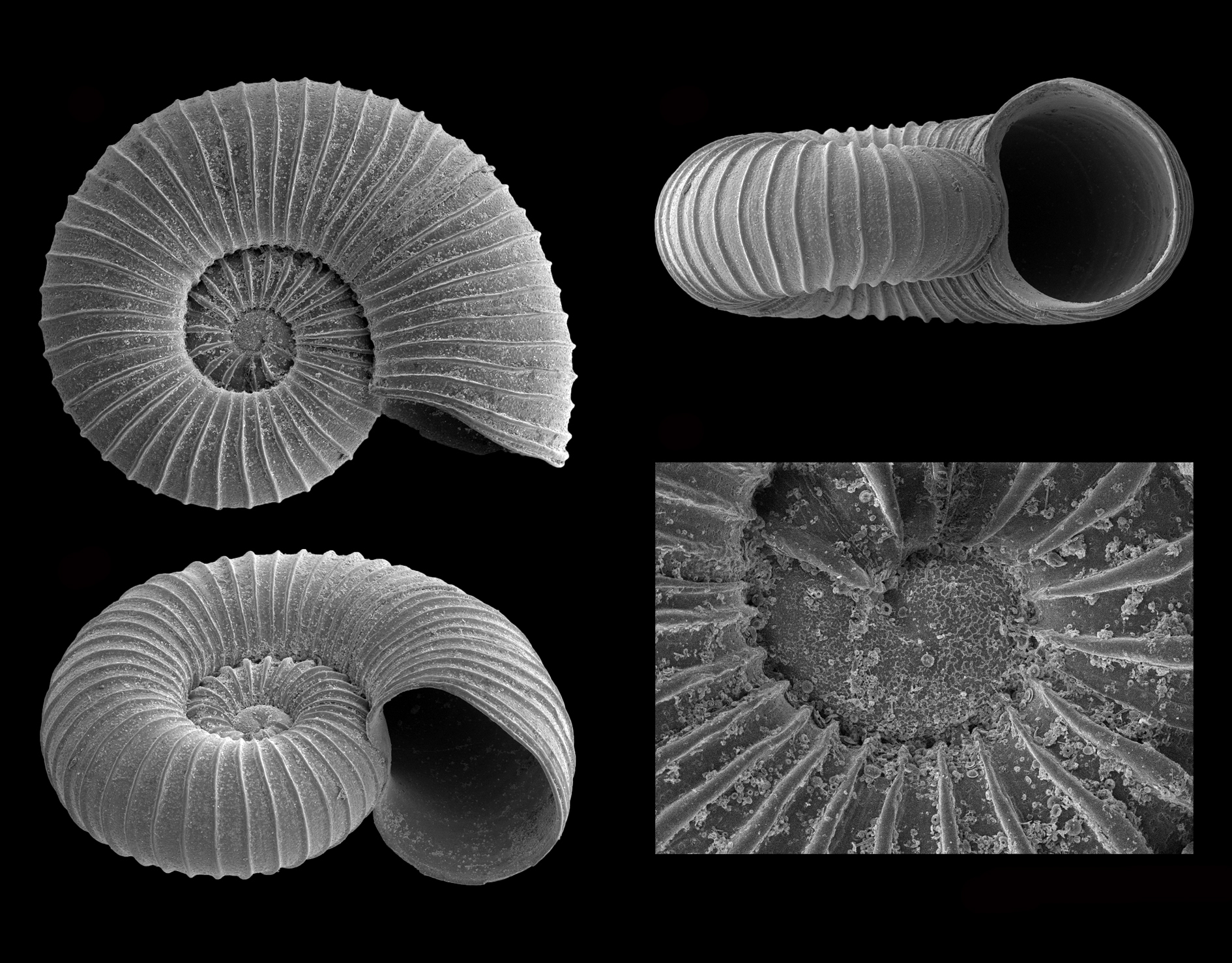
- Shell of Adeuomphalus axistriatus (holotype at MNHN, Paris)

Scientific classification
- Kingdom: Animalia
- Phylum: Mollusca
- Class: Gastropoda
- Subclass: Vetigastropoda
- Superfamily: Seguenzioidea
- Family: incertae sedis
- Genus: Adeuomphalus; Seguenza, 1876

Type species
- Adeuomphalus ammoniformis Seguenza, G., 1876

Synonyms
- Transomalogyra Palazzi & Gaglini, 1979

= Adeuomphalus =

Genus of gastropods

Adeuomphalus is a genus of sea snails, marine gastropod molluscs unassigned to family within the superfamily Seguenzioidea.

== Species ==
Species within the genus Adeuomphalus include:

- Adeuomphalus ammoniformis (Seguenza, 1876)
- Adeuomphalus axistriatus Hoffman, Gofas & Freiwald, 2020
- † Adeuomphalus bandeli (Schröder, 1995)
- Adeuomphalus collinsi Chikyu & Warén, 2009
- Adeuomphalus crenulatus (Powell, 1937)
- Adeuomphalus curvistriatus Hoffman, Gofas & Freiwald, 2020
- Adeuomphalus densicostatus (Jeffreys, 1884)
- Adeuomphalus diegoalejandroi Fernández-Garcés, Rubio & Rolán, 2019
- Adeuomphalus elegans Chikyu & Warén, 2009
- Adeuomphalus guillei Chikyu & Warén, 2009
- Adeuomphalus misaeli Fernández-Garcés, Rubio & Rolán, 2019
- Adeuomphalus orientalis (Thiele, 1925)
- Adeuomphalus sinuosus (Sykes, 1925)
- Adeuomphalus trochanter Warén & Bouchet, 2001
- Adeuomphalus valentinae Fernández-Garcés, Rubio & Rolán, 2019
- Adeuomphalus xerente Absalão, 2009

Species brought into synonymy

- Adeuomphalus laevis Rindone, 1990: synonym of Eudaronia aperta (Sykes, 1925)
