= Eudaronia jaffaensis =

Scientific classification
- Kingdom: Animalia
- Phylum: Mollusca
- Class: Gastropoda
- Subclass: Vetigastropoda
- Superfamily: Seguenzioidea
- Family: Eudaroniidae
- Genus: Eudaronia
- Species: E. jaffaensis

Binomial name
- Eudaronia jaffaensis (Verco, 1909)

Synonyms
- Cyclostrema jaffaensis Verco, 1909

Species of gastropod

Eudaronia jaffaensis is a species of sea snail, a marine gastropod mollusk, unassigned in the superfamily Seguenzioidea.
