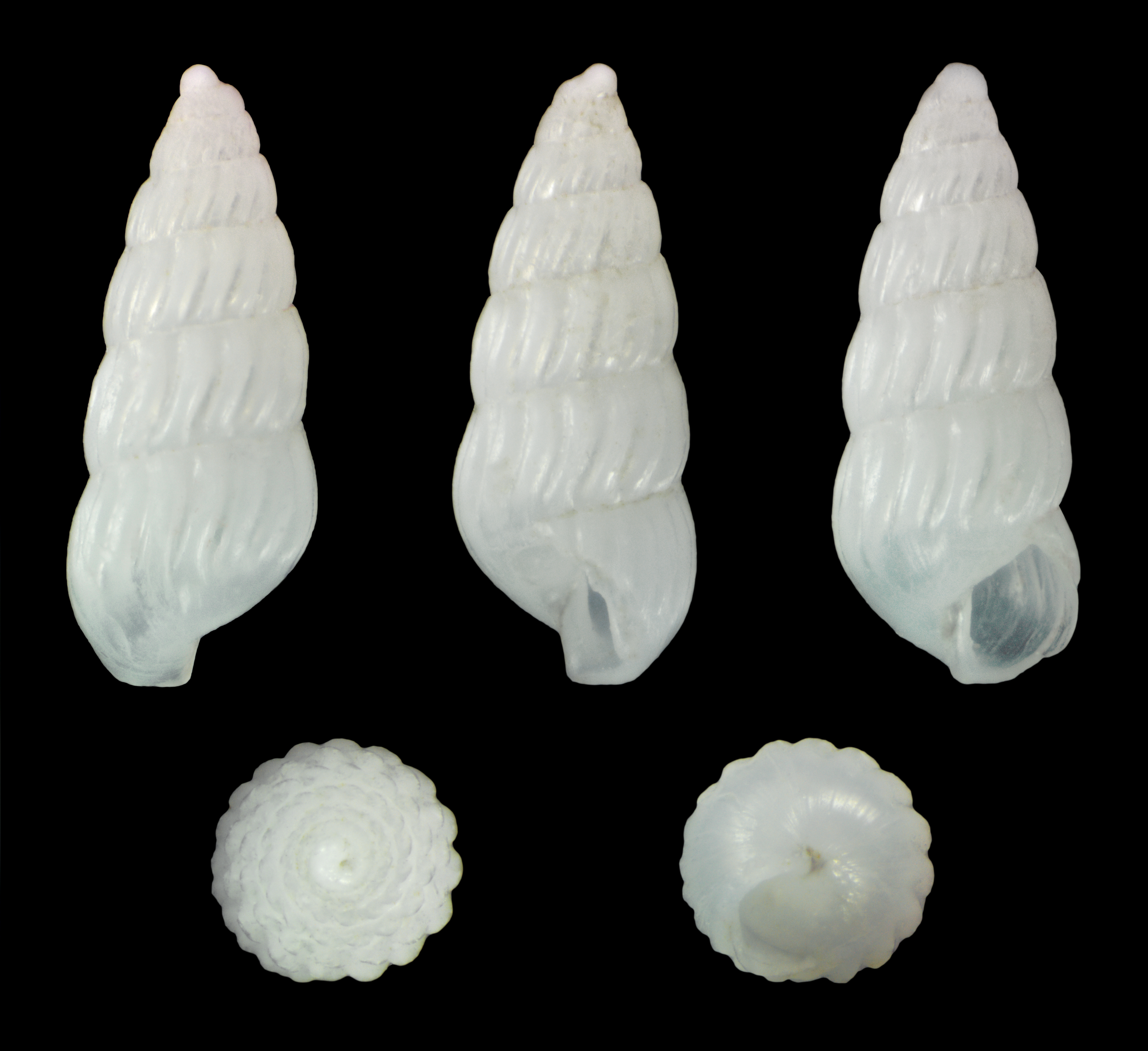

Scientific classification
- Kingdom: Animalia
- Phylum: Mollusca
- Class: Gastropoda
- Family: Pyramidellidae
- Genus: Turbonilla
- Species: T. pumila

Binomial name
- Turbonilla pumila Seguenza G., 1876

Synonyms
- Turbonilla hannoni Pallary, 1912; Turbonilla innovata Monterosato, 1884; Turbonilla pallaryi Dautzenberg, 1910; Turbonilla pseudostricta F. Nordsieck, 1972; Turbonilla stricta Pallary, 1904

= Turbonilla pumila =

Species of gastropod

Turbonilla pumila is a species of sea snail, a marine gastropod mollusk in the family Pyramidellidae, the pyrams and their allies.

== Distribution ==
This species occurs in the following locations:

- Belgian Exclusive Economic Zone
- European waters (ERMS scope)
- Greek Exclusive Economic Zone
- Irish Exclusive economic Zone
- Portuguese Exclusive Economic Zone
- Spanish Exclusive Economic Zone
- United Kingdom Exclusive Economic Zone
- Wimereux
