= Alvania bicingulata =

Scientific classification
- Kingdom: Animalia
- Phylum: Mollusca
- Class: Gastropoda
- Subclass: Caenogastropoda
- Order: Littorinimorpha
- Superfamily: Rissooidea
- Family: Rissoidae
- Genus: Alvania
- Species: †A. bicingulata

Binomial name
- †Alvania bicingulata (Seguenza L., 1903)

Synonyms
- † Rissoa bicingulata G. Seguenza, 1876

Species of gastropod

Alvania bicingulata is an extinct species of minute sea snail, a marine gastropod mollusk or micromollusk in the family Rissoidae.

== Description ==
The length of the shell attains 3.35 mm, its diameter 1.94 mm.
