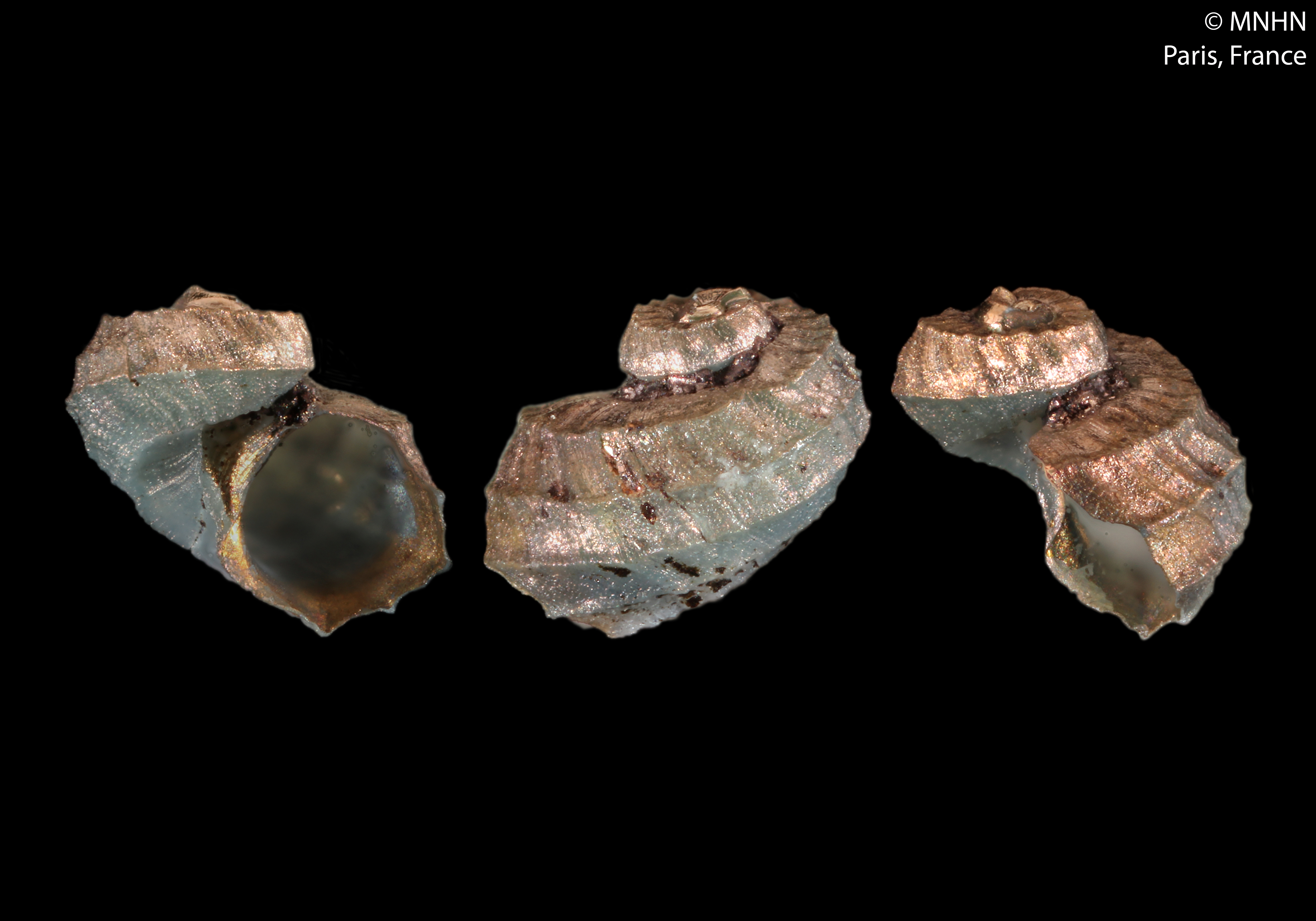
- Shell of Ventsia tricarinata (holotype at MNHN, Paris)

Conservation status
- Critically Endangered (IUCN 3.1)

Scientific classification
- Kingdom: Animalia
- Phylum: Mollusca
- Class: Gastropoda
- Subclass: Vetigastropoda
- Superfamily: Seguenzioidea
- Family: incertae sedis
- Genus: Ventsia
- Species: V. tricarinata

Binomial name
- Ventsia tricarinata Warén & Bouchet, 1993

= Ventsia tricarinata =

Species of gastropod

Ventsia tricarinata is a species of sea snail, a marine gastropod mollusk, unassigned in the superfamily Seguenzioidea.

== Distribution ==
This marine species occurs at a hydrothermal vent at the Lau Basin also off Fiji.
