= Lissotestella waimamakuensis =

Scientific classification
- Kingdom: Animalia
- Phylum: Mollusca
- Class: Gastropoda
- Subclass: Vetigastropoda
- Family: incertae sedis
- Genus: Lissotestella
- Species: †L. waimamakuensis

Binomial name
- †Lissotestella waimamakuensis Laws, 1948

Extinct species of gastropod

Lissotestella waimamakuensis is an extinct species of sea snail, a marine gastropod mollusc, unassigned in the superfamily Seguenzioidea.

== Distribution ==
This species occurs in New Zealand.
