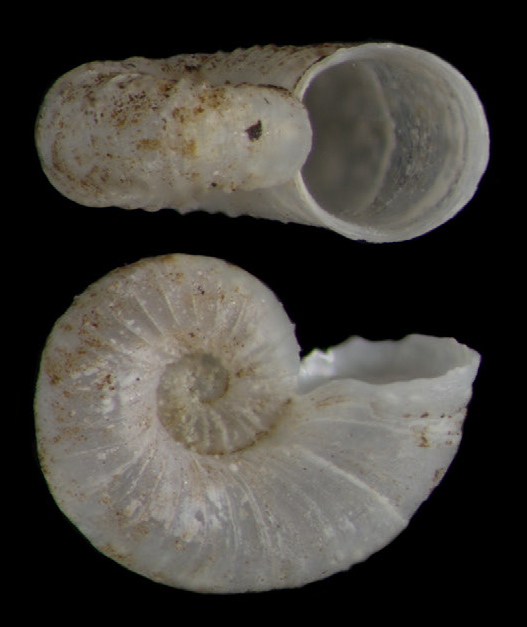

Scientific classification
- Kingdom: Animalia
- Phylum: Mollusca
- Class: Gastropoda
- Subclass: Vetigastropoda
- Superfamily: Seguenzioidea
- Family: incertae sedis
- Genus: Adeuomphalus
- Species: A. sinuosus

Binomial name
- Adeuomphalus sinuosus (Sykes, 1925)

= Adeuomphalus sinuosus =

Species of gastropod

Adeuomphalus sinuosus is a species of sea snail, a marine gastropod mollusc, unassigned to family in the superfamily Seguenzioidea.
