= Cataegis leucogranulatus =

Scientific classification
- Kingdom: Animalia
- Phylum: Mollusca
- Class: Gastropoda
- Subclass: Vetigastropoda
- Family: Cataegidae
- Genus: Cataegis
- Species: C. leucogranulatus

Binomial name
- Cataegis leucogranulatus (Fu & Sun, 2006)

Species of gastropod

Cataegis leucogranulatus is a species of sea snail, a marine gastropod mollusk in the family Cataegidae.

== Description ==
The shells of this species are their most prominent feature, they are similar to those of the Hybochelus fossulatus. They are about 5–10 mm and are whitish in color, having a lot of circular like protrusions forming a spiral pattern on the shell.

== Distribution ==
This species occurs in the South China Sea, and predominantly is found at approximately 350 meters deep in the mud or sand. It has also been some found in the waters off Pratas Island, located in South China Sea.
