= Cataegis meroglypta =

Scientific classification
- Kingdom: Animalia
- Phylum: Mollusca
- Class: Gastropoda
- Subclass: Vetigastropoda
- Family: Cataegidae
- Genus: Cataegis
- Species: C. meroglypta

Binomial name
- Cataegis meroglypta McLean & Quinn, 1987

Species of gastropod

Cataegis meroglypta is a species of sea snail, a marine gastropod mollusk in the family Cataegidae.

== Description ==
The height of the shell attains 19 mm.

== Distribution ==
This species occurs in the Western Atlantic Ocean, in the Caribbean Sea off Colombia and in the Gulf of Mexico off Louisiana.
