= Adeuomphalus trochanter =

Conservation status
- Vulnerable (IUCN 3.1)

Scientific classification
- Kingdom: Animalia
- Phylum: Mollusca
- Class: Gastropoda
- Subclass: Vetigastropoda
- Superfamily: Seguenzioidea
- Family: incertae sedis
- Genus: Adeuomphalus
- Species: A. trochanter

Binomial name
- Adeuomphalus trochanter Warén & Bouchet, 2001

Species of gastropod

Adeuomphalus trochanter is a species of sea snail, a marine gastropod mollusc unassigned to family in the superfamily Seguenzioidea.
