= Lissotestella tenuilirata =

Scientific classification
- Kingdom: Animalia
- Phylum: Mollusca
- Class: Gastropoda
- Subclass: Vetigastropoda
- Family: incertae sedis
- Genus: Lissotestella
- Species: L. tenuilirata

Binomial name
- Lissotestella tenuilirata Powell, 1931

Synonyms
- Lissotesta tenuilirata Powell 1931

Species of gastropod

Lissotestella tenuilirata is a species of small sea snail, a marine gastropod mollusc, unassigned in the superfamily Seguenzioidea.

== Distribution ==
This marine species occurs off New Zealand.
