= Adeuomphalus collinsi =

Conservation status
- Critically Endangered (IUCN 3.1)

Scientific classification
- Kingdom: Animalia
- Phylum: Mollusca
- Class: Gastropoda
- Subclass: Vetigastropoda
- Superfamily: Seguenzioidea
- Family: incertae sedis
- Genus: Adeuomphalus
- Species: A. collinsi

Binomial name
- Adeuomphalus collinsi Kano, Chiryu & Warén, 2009

Species of gastropod

Adeuomphalus collinsi is a species of sea snail, a marine gastropod mollusc unassigned to family in the superfamily Seguenzioidea.
