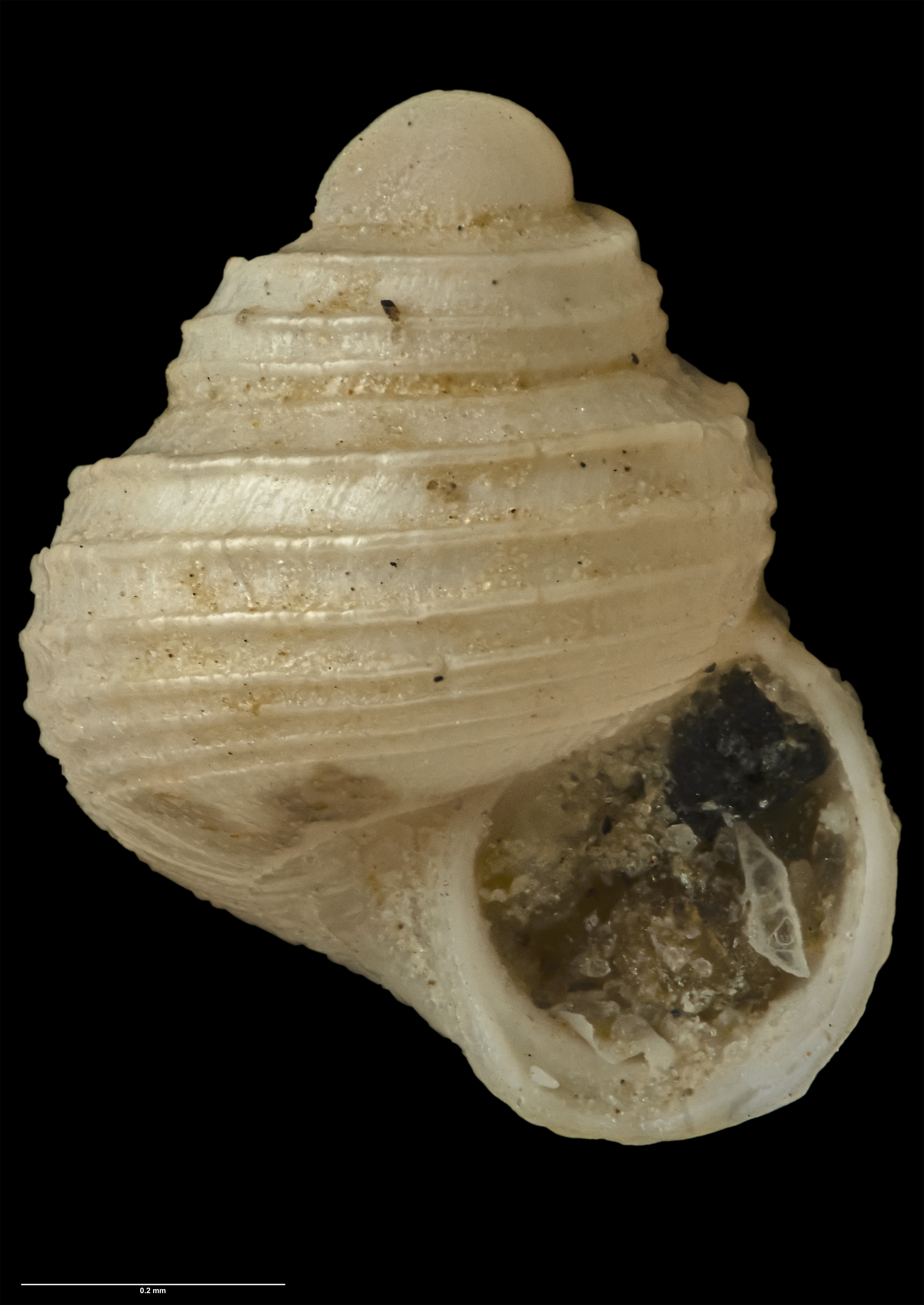

Scientific classification
- Kingdom: Animalia
- Phylum: Mollusca
- Class: Gastropoda
- Subclass: Vetigastropoda
- Family: incertae sedis
- Genus: Lissotestella
- Species: L. consobrina

Binomial name
- Lissotestella consobrina Powell 1940

Synonyms
- Lissotesta consobrina Powell 1940

= Lissotestella consobrina =

Species of gastropod

Lissotestella consobrina is a species of minute sea snail, a marine gastropod mollusc, unassigned in the superfamily Seguenzioidea.

== Distribution ==
This marine species occurs off New Zealand.
