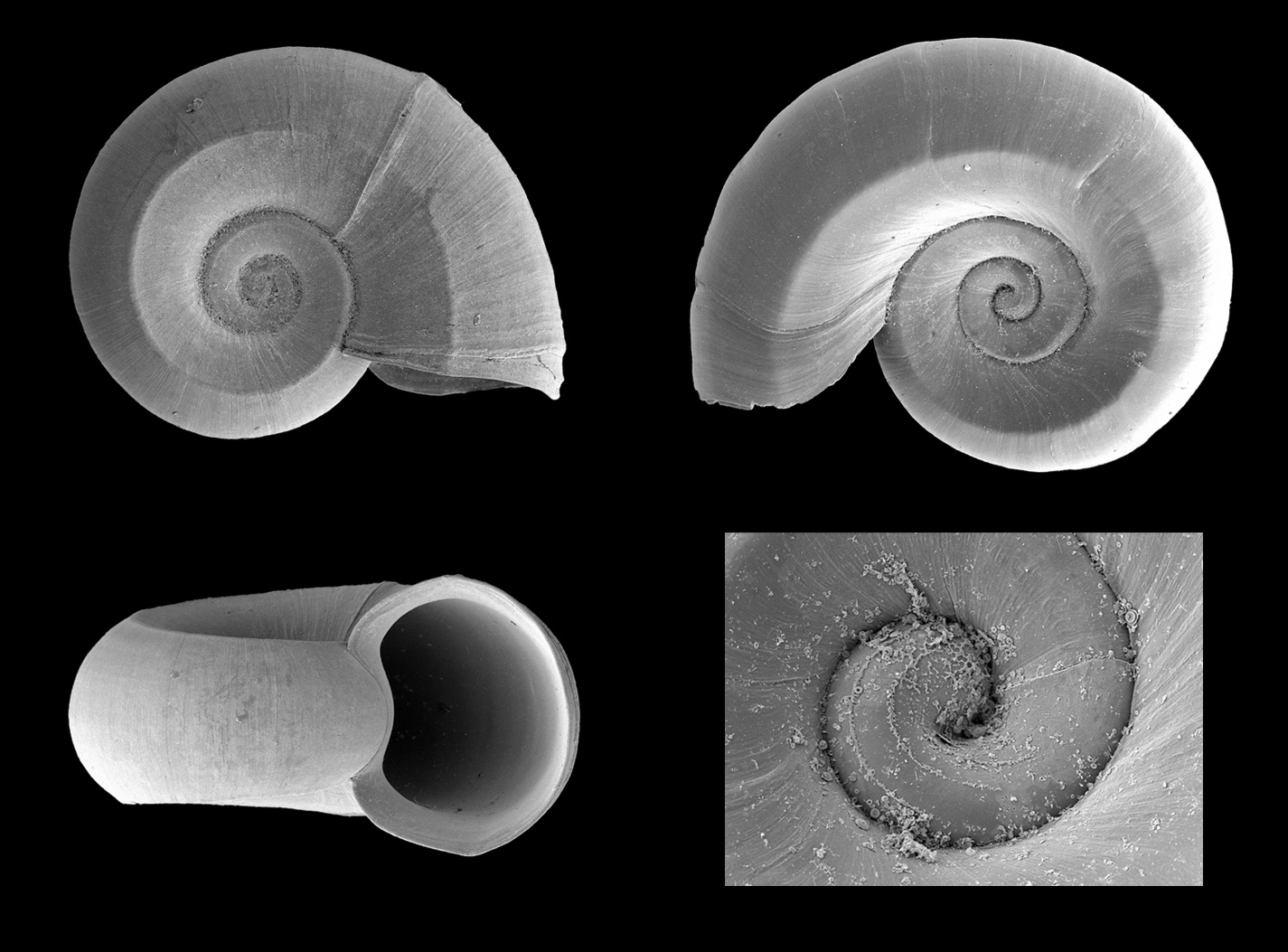
- Shell of Eudaronia spirata (paratype at MNHN, Paris)

Scientific classification
- Kingdom: Animalia
- Phylum: Mollusca
- Class: Gastropoda
- Subclass: Vetigastropoda
- Family: Eudaroniidae
- Genus: Eudaronia; Cotton, 1945

Type species
- Cyclostrema jaffaensis Verco, 1909

Synonyms
- † Levihelix Gründel, 2000

= Eudaronia =

Genus of gastropods

Eudaronia is a genus of sea snails, marine gastropod mollusks in the family Eudaroniidae within the superfamily Seguenzioidea.

== Species ==
Species within the genus Eudaronia include:

- Eudaronia aperta (Sykes, 1925)
- Eudaronia biconcava (Thiele, 1925)
- Eudaronia jaffaensis (Verco, 1909)
- Eudaronia mikra Hoffman, Gofas & Freiwald, 2020
- † Eudaronia pusilla (Gründel, 2000)
- Eudaronia spirata Hoffman, Gofas & Freiwald, 2020
