= Ventsia hollanderi =

Scientific classification
- Kingdom: Animalia
- Phylum: Mollusca
- Class: Gastropoda
- Subclass: Vetigastropoda
- Superfamily: Seguenzioidea
- Family: incertae sedis
- Genus: Ventsia
- Species: V. hollanderi

Binomial name
- Ventsia hollanderi Fernández-Garcés, Rubio & Rolán, 2019

Species of gastropod

Ventsia hollanderi is a species of sea snail, a marine gastropod mollusk, unassigned in the superfamily Seguenzioidea.

== Distribution ==
This marine species occurs in deep water off Cuba.
