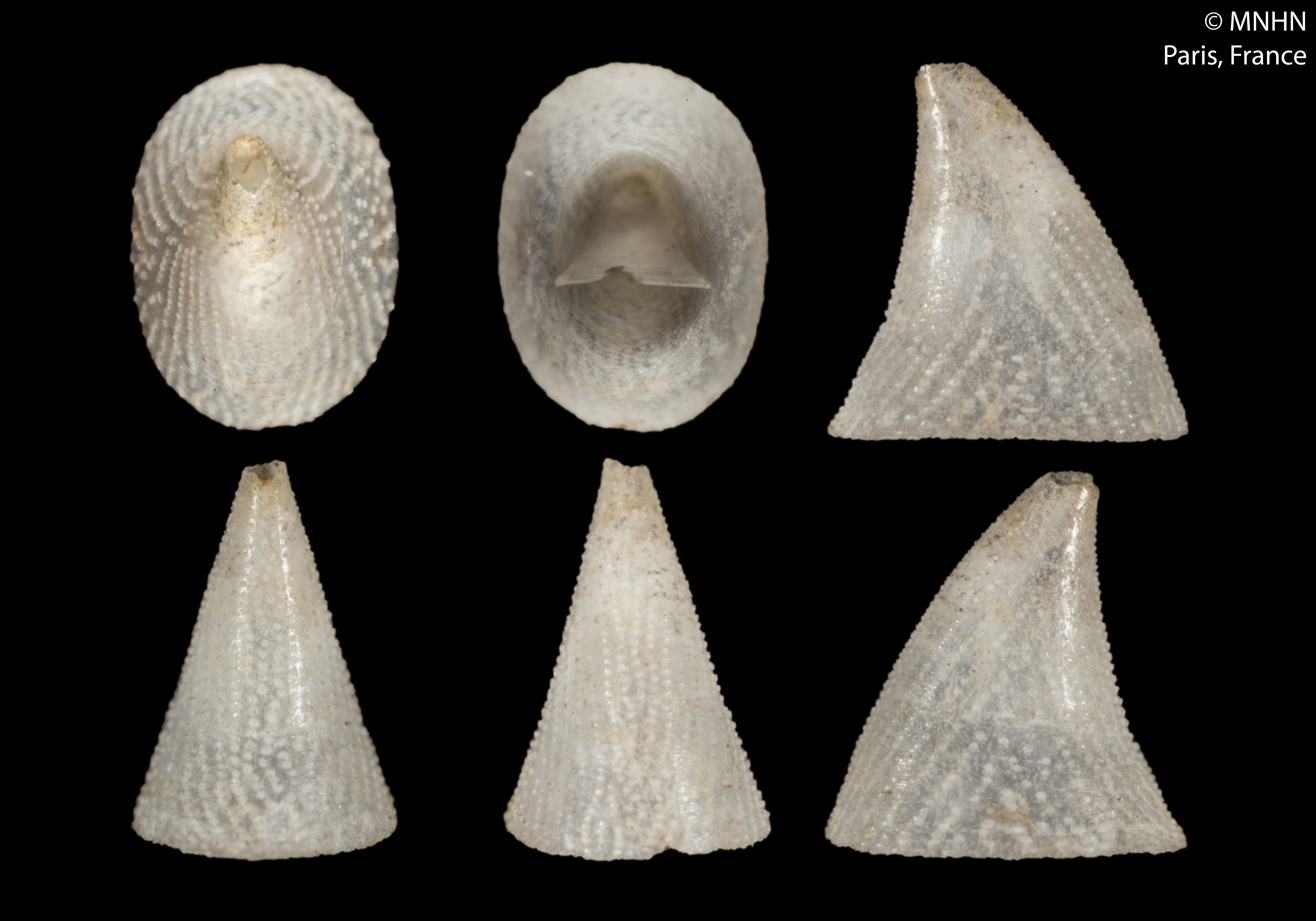
- Shell of Cornisepta aninga (holotype at MNHN, Paris)

Scientific classification
- Kingdom: Animalia
- Phylum: Mollusca
- Class: Gastropoda
- Subclass: Vetigastropoda
- Order: Lepetellida
- Superfamily: Fissurelloidea
- Family: Fissurellidae
- Subfamily: Zeidorinae
- Genus: Cornisepta; McLean & Geiger, 1998

Type species
- Fissurisepta antarctica Egorova, 1972

= Cornisepta =

Genus of gastropods

Cornisepta is a genus of sea snails, marine gastropod mollusks in the family Fissurellidae, the keyhole limpets.

== Species ==
Species within the genus Cornisepta include:

- Cornisepta acuminata (Watson, 1883)
- Cornisepta aninga Simone & Cunha, 2014
- Cornisepta antarctica (Egorova, 1972)
- Cornisepta arrepiata Simone & Cunha, 2014
- Cornisepta crossei (Dautzenberg & H. Fischer, 1896)
- Cornisepta festiva Crozier, 1966
- Cornisepta fumarium (Hedley, 1911)
- Cornisepta guzmani Araya & Geiger, 2013
- Cornisepta levinae McLean & Geiger, 1998
- Cornisepta microphyma (Dautzenberg & H. Fischer, 1896)
- Cornisepta monsfuji Chino, 2009
- Cornisepta onychoides (Herbert & Kilburn, 1986)
- Cornisepta pacifica (Cowan, 1969)
- Cornisepta rostrata (Seguenza, 1864)
- Cornisepta soyoae (Habe, 1951)
- Cornisepta uirapa Simone & Cunha, 2014
- Cornisepta verenae McLean & Geiger, 1998
