= Alvania gemmulata =

Scientific classification
- Kingdom: Animalia
- Phylum: Mollusca
- Class: Gastropoda
- Subclass: Caenogastropoda
- Order: Littorinimorpha
- Superfamily: Rissooidea
- Family: Rissoidae
- Genus: Alvania
- Species: †A. gemmulata

Binomial name
- †Alvania gemmulata (G. Seguenza, 1876)

Synonyms
- † Alvinia gemmulata G. Seguenza, 1876; † Rissoa (Alvania) gemmulata G. Seguenza, 1876 superseded combination (Alvania accepted as full genus)

Species of gastropod

Alvania gemmulata is an extinct species of minute sea snail, a marine gastropod mollusk or micromollusk in the family Rissoidae.

== Distribution ==
Fossils were found in Pliocene strata off Messina, Italy.
