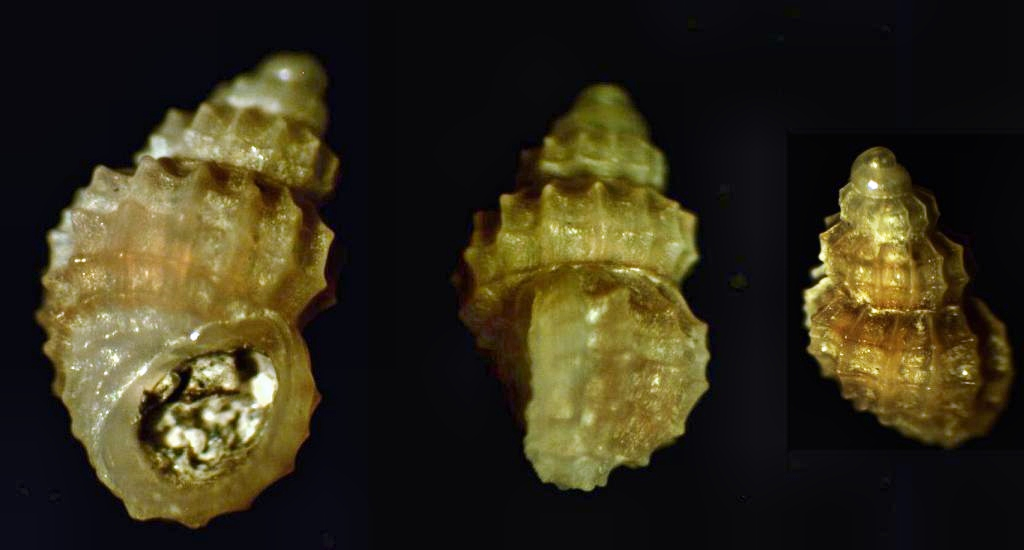
- shells of Alvania clathrella

Scientific classification
- Kingdom: Animalia
- Phylum: Mollusca
- Class: Gastropoda
- Subclass: Caenogastropoda
- Order: Littorinimorpha
- Superfamily: Rissooidea
- Family: Rissoidae
- Genus: Alvania
- Species: A. clathrella

Binomial name
- Alvania clathrella (Seguenza L., 1903)

Synonyms
- Alvania (Alvinia) clathrella L. Seguenza, 1903

= Alvania clathrella =

Species of gastropod

Alvania clathrella is a species of minute sea snail, a marine gastropod mollusk or micromollusk in the family Rissoidae.

== Description ==
The length of the shell varies between 2 mm and 3 mm.

== Distribution ==
This species mostly occurs in the Mediterranean Sea off Sicily and Greece.
