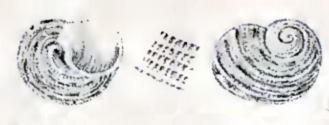
- Hybochelus cancellatus

Scientific classification
- Kingdom: Animalia
- Phylum: Mollusca
- Class: Gastropoda
- Subclass: Vetigastropoda
- Family: Chilodontaidae
- Genus: Hybochelus; Pilsbry, 1890

Type species
- Stomatella cancellata Krauss, 1848

= Hybochelus =

Genus of gastropods

Hybochelus is a genus of sea snails, marine gastropod molluscs in the family Chilodontaidae (formerly in the family Trochidae, the top snails).

== Species ==
Species within the genus Hybochelus include:

- Hybochelus cancellatus (Krauss, 1848)
- Hybochelus sagamiensis Kuroda & Habe, 1971

Species brought into synonymy

- Hybochelus fossulatus (Souverbie [in Souverbie & Montrouzier], 1875): synonym of Hybochelus cancellatus (Krauss, 1848)
- Hybochelus leucogranulatus Fu & Sun, 2006: synonym of Cataegis leucogranulatus (Fu & Sun, 2006)
- Hybochelus mysticus (Pilsbry, 1889): synonym of Euchelus mysticus Pilsbry, 1889
