= Lissotestella alpha =

Scientific classification
- Kingdom: Animalia
- Phylum: Mollusca
- Class: Gastropoda
- Subclass: Vetigastropoda
- Family: incertae sedis
- Genus: Lissotestella
- Species: †L. alpha

Binomial name
- †Lissotestella alpha (Laws, 1939)

Synonyms
- Lissotesta alpha Laws, 1939

Extinct species of gastropod

Lissotestella alpha is an extinct species of sea snail, a marine gastropod mollusc, unassigned in the superfamily Seguenzioidea.

== Distribution ==
This species occurs in New Zealand.
