= Adeuomphalus guillei =

Scientific classification
- Kingdom: Animalia
- Phylum: Mollusca
- Class: Gastropoda
- Subclass: Vetigastropoda
- Superfamily: Seguenzioidea
- Family: incertae sedis
- Genus: Adeuomphalus
- Species: A. guillei

Binomial name
- Adeuomphalus guillei Kano, Chikyu & Warén, 2009

Species of gastropod

Adeuomphalus guillei is a species of sea snail, a marine gastropod mollusc unassigned to family in the superfamily Seguenzioidea.
