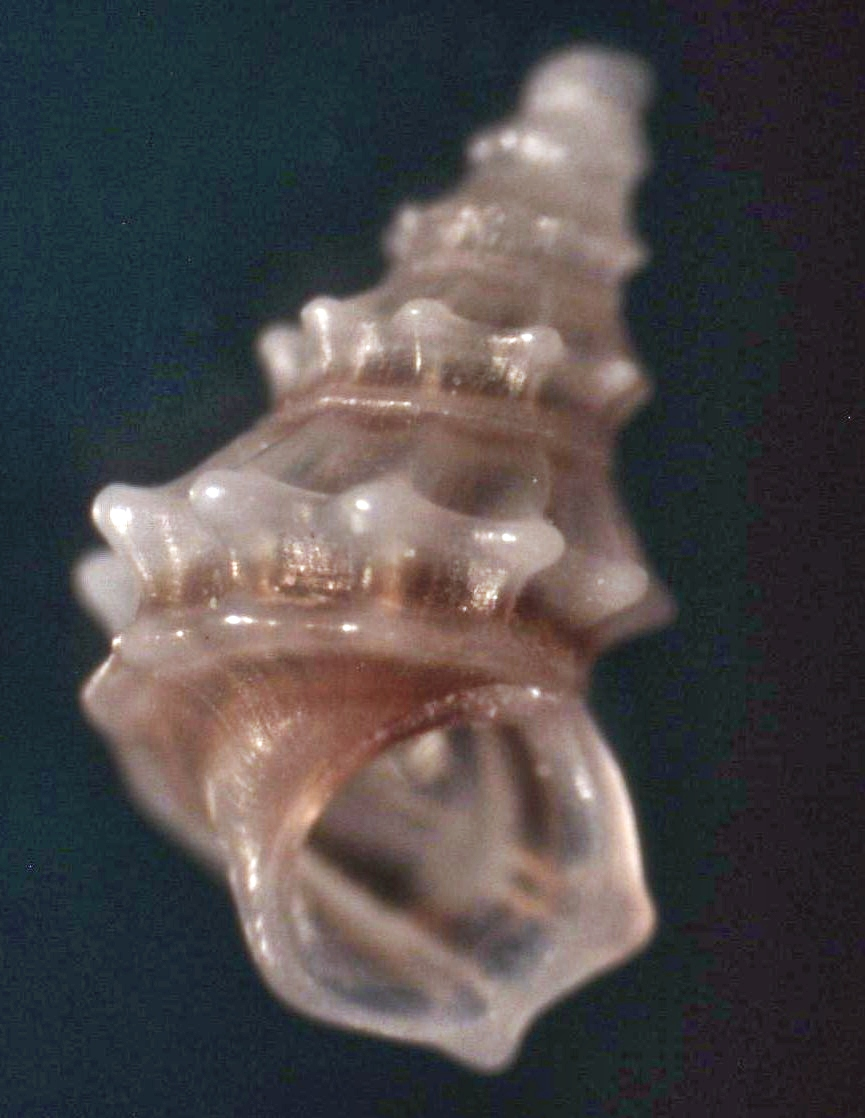
- Apertural view of Alvania spinosa

Scientific classification
- Kingdom: Animalia
- Phylum: Mollusca
- Class: Gastropoda
- Subclass: Caenogastropoda
- Order: Littorinimorpha
- Family: Rissoidae
- Genus: Alvania
- Species: A. spinosa

Binomial name
- Alvania spinosa (Monterosato, 1890)

Synonyms
- Alcidia spinosa Monterosato 1890 (basionym); Merelina (Alcidiella) spinosa (Monterosato, 1890); Rissoa angulata Seguenza G. 1876

= Alvania spinosa =

Species of gastropod

Alvania spinosa is a species of small sea snail, a marine gastropod mollusk or micromollusk in the family Rissoidae.

== Description ==
The length of the shell varies between 1.75 mm and 3.7 mm.

== Distribution ==
This species occurs in the Western Mediterranean Sea.
