= Alvania reticulatopunctata =

Scientific classification
- Kingdom: Animalia
- Phylum: Mollusca
- Class: Gastropoda
- Subclass: Caenogastropoda
- Order: Littorinimorpha
- Superfamily: Rissooidea
- Family: Rissoidae
- Genus: Alvania
- Species: †A. reticulatopunctata

Binomial name
- †Alvania reticulatopunctata Seguenza, 1879

Species of gastropod

Alvania reticulatopunctata is an extinct species of minute sea snail, a marine gastropod mollusk or micromollusk in the family Rissoidae.

== Description ==
The length of the shell attains 4.5 mm, its diameter 3.3 mm.

== Distribution ==
Fossils have been found in Tertiary strata in Reggio Calabria, Italy.
