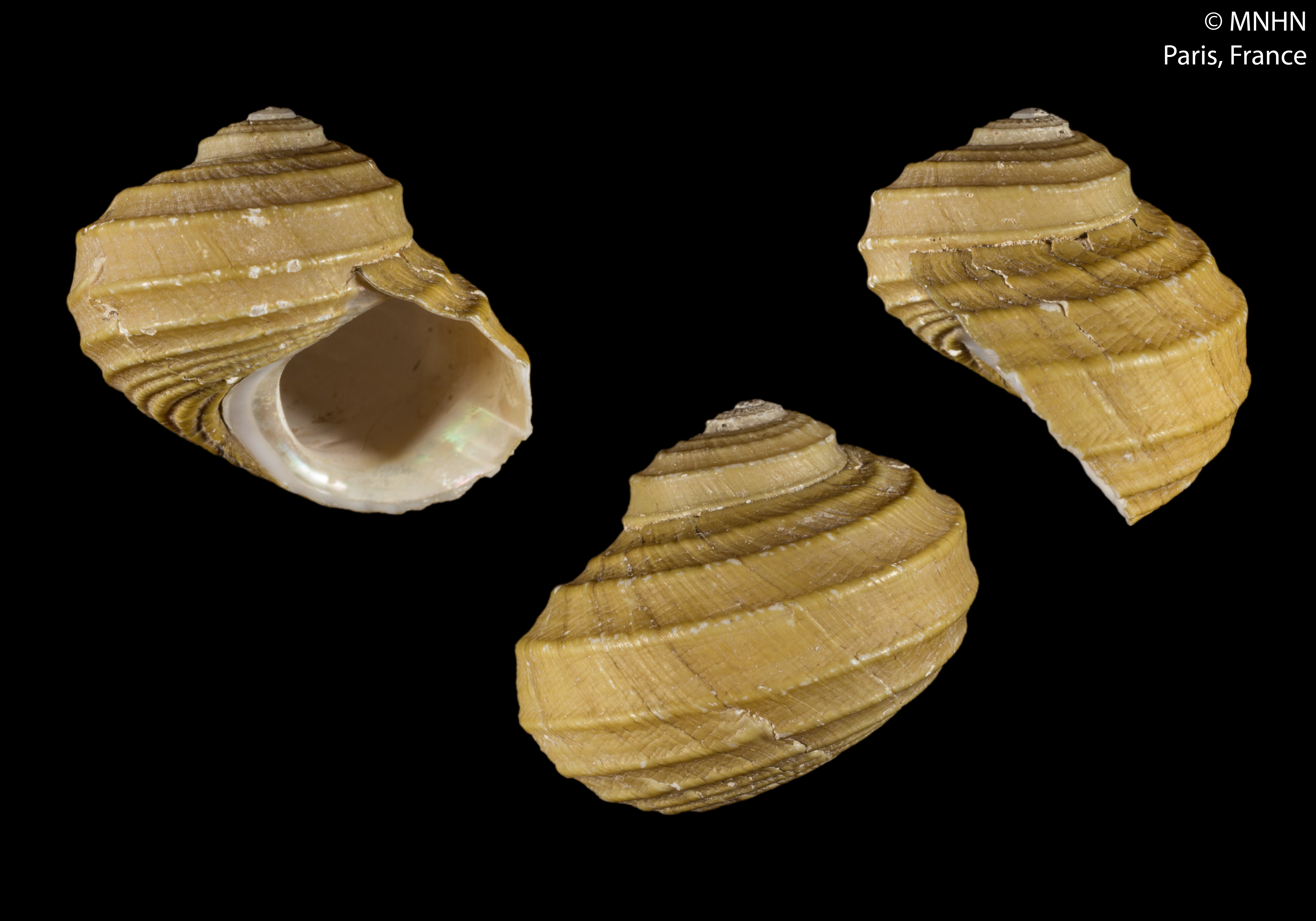
- Shell of Kanoia meroglypta (holotype at MNHN, Paris)

Scientific classification
- Kingdom: Animalia
- Phylum: Mollusca
- Class: Gastropoda
- Subclass: Vetigastropoda
- Superfamily: Seguenzioidea
- Family: Cataegidae
- Genus: Kanoia; Warén & Rouse, 2016

Type species
- Kanoia myronfeinbergi Warén & Rouse, 2016

= Kanoia =

Genus of gastropods

Kanoia is a genus of sea snails, marine gastropod mollusks in the family Cataegidae.

== Species ==
- Kanoia meroglypta (McLean & Quinn, 1987)
- Kanoia myronfeinbergi Warén & Rouse, 2016
