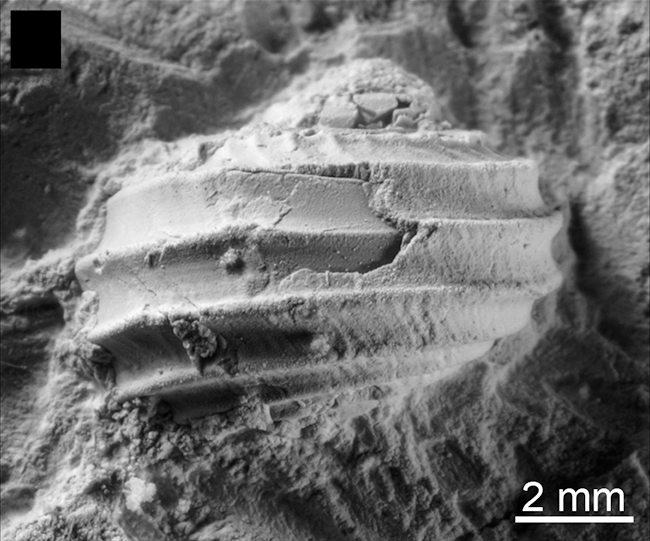
- fossil Cataegis godineauensis from the late Miocene

Scientific classification
- Kingdom: Animalia
- Phylum: Mollusca
- Class: Gastropoda
- Subclass: Vetigastropoda
- Superfamily: Seguenzioidea
- Family: Cataegidae
- Genus: Cataegis; McLean & Quinn, 1987

Type species
- Cataegis toreuta McLean & Quinn, 1987

= Cataegis =

Cataegis Temporal range: Early Oligocene-Recent

Genus of gastropods

Cataegis is a genus of sea snails, marine gastropod mollusks in the family Cataegidae.

== Species ==
Species within the genus Cataegis include:

- Cataegis celebesensis McLean & Quinn, 1987
- Cataegis finkli (Petuch, 1987)
- † Cataegis godineauensis Van Winkle, 1919
- Cataegis leucogranulatus (Fu & Sun, 2006)
- † Cataegis nakagawensis Kaim, R. G. Jenkins & Hikida, 2009
- Cataegis pleres Vilvens, 2016
- Cataegis stroggile Vilvens, 2016
- Cataegis tallorbioides Vilvens, 2016

Species brought into synonymy

- Cataegis meroglypta McLean & Quinn, 1987: synonym of Kanoia meroglypta (McLean & Quinn, 1987) (original combination)
- Cataegis toreuta McLean & Quinn, 1987: synonym of Cataegis finkli (Petuch, 1987)

== See also ==
- Terrestrial molluscs
- Land snail
- Land slug
- Sea snail
- Sea slug
