= Alvania coccoi =

Scientific classification
- Kingdom: Animalia
- Phylum: Mollusca
- Class: Gastropoda
- Subclass: Caenogastropoda
- Order: Littorinimorpha
- Superfamily: Rissooidea
- Family: Rissoidae
- Genus: Alvania
- Species: †A. coccoi

Binomial name
- †Alvania coccoi (G. Seguenza, 1876)

Synonyms
- † Rissoa (Alvania) coccoi G. Seguenza, 1876 superseded combination (Alvania accepted as full genus)

Species of gastropod

Alvania coccoi is an extinct species of minute sea snail, a marine gastropod mollusk or micromollusk in the family Rissoidae.

== Distribution ==
Fossils were found in Pliocene strata in Southern Italy.
