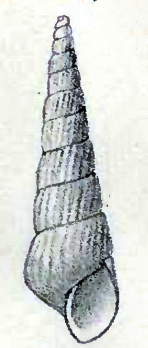
- Drawing of a shell of Turbonilla magnifica

Scientific classification
- Kingdom: Animalia
- Phylum: Mollusca
- Class: Gastropoda
- Family: Pyramidellidae
- Genus: Turbonilla
- Species: T. magnifica

Binomial name
- Turbonilla magnifica (Seguenza G., 1879)

Synonyms
- Odostomia magnifica Seguenza G., 1879

= Turbonilla magnifica =

Species of gastropod

Turbonilla magnifica is a species of sea snail, a marine gastropod mollusk in the family Pyramidellidae, the pyrams and their allies.

== Description ==
The shell has a white or pinkish white color and is often beautifully iridescent. Its length measures 12 mm. The teleoconch contains 11-12 whorls, somewhat flattened, rounded at the impressed suture. They are longitudinally ribbed with curved ribs. The low and rounded columella is not dentate.

== Distribution ==
This species occurs in the following locations:

- Canary Islands
- Cape Verde
- European waters (ERMS scope)
- Mediterranean Sea

== Notes ==
Additional information regarding this species:

- authority: authority with a T. in the initials according to Rolan (instead of G. according to Gofas).
