= Adeuomphalus xerente =

Scientific classification
- Kingdom: Animalia
- Phylum: Mollusca
- Class: Gastropoda
- Subclass: Vetigastropoda
- Superfamily: Seguenzioidea
- Family: incertae sedis
- Genus: Adeuomphalus
- Species: A. xerente

Binomial name
- Adeuomphalus xerente Absalao, 2009

Species of gastropod

Adeuomphalus xerente is a species of sea snail, a marine gastropod mollusc unassigned to family in the superfamily Seguenzioidea.

== Description ==
The shell reaches a maximum reported size of 0.74 mm.

== Distribution ==
This species occurs in the Atlantic Ocean off Brazil, found at depths between 1039 m and 1630 m.
