= Adeuomphalus crenulatus =

Scientific classification
- Kingdom: Animalia
- Phylum: Mollusca
- Class: Gastropoda
- Subclass: Vetigastropoda
- Superfamily: Seguenzioidea
- Family: incertae sedis
- Genus: Adeuomphalus
- Species: A. crenulatus

Binomial name
- Adeuomphalus crenulatus (Powell, 1937)

Synonyms
- Zerotula crenulata Powell, 1937

Species of gastropod

Adeuomphalus crenulatus is a species of sea snail, a marine gastropod mollusc, unassigned to family in the superfamily Seguenzioidea.

== Distribution ==
This marine species occurs off New Zealand.
