= Eudaronia aperta =

Scientific classification
- Kingdom: Animalia
- Phylum: Mollusca
- Class: Gastropoda
- Subclass: Vetigastropoda
- Family: Eudaroniidae
- Genus: Eudaronia
- Species: E. aperta

Binomial name
- Eudaronia aperta (Sykes, 1925)

Synonyms
- Adeuomphalus laevis Rindone 1990; Homalogyra aperta Sykes 1925 (original combination)

Species of gastropod

Eudaronia aperta is a species of sea snail, a marine gastropod mollusk in the family Eudaroniidae.
