= Fissurisepta enderbyensis =

Scientific classification
- Kingdom: Animalia
- Phylum: Mollusca
- Class: Gastropoda
- Subclass: Vetigastropoda
- Order: Lepetellida
- Family: Fissurellidae
- Subfamily: Emarginulinae
- Genus: Fissurisepta
- Species: F. enderbyensis

Binomial name
- Fissurisepta enderbyensis (Powell, 1958)

Synonyms
- Puncturella enderbyensis Powell, 1958

Species of gastropod

Fissurisepta enderbyensis is a species of sea snail, a marine gastropod mollusk in the family Fissurellidae, the keyhole limpets and slit limpets.
