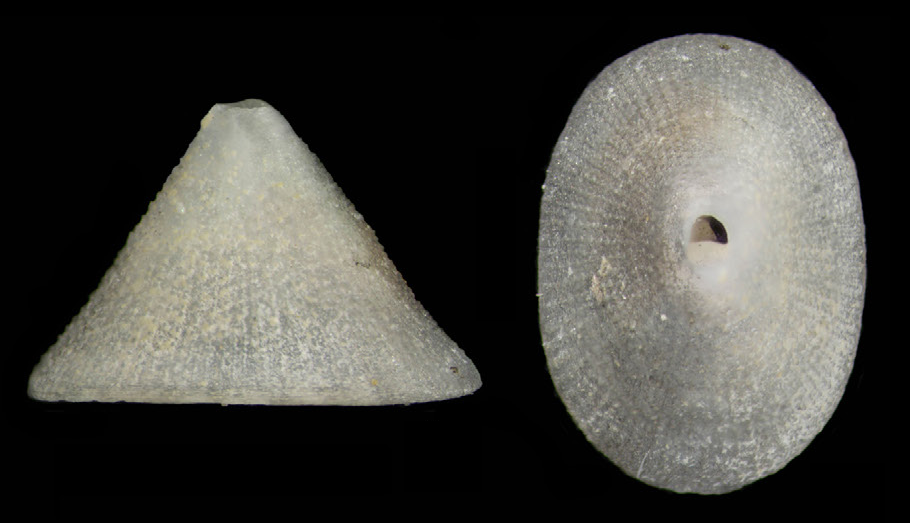

Scientific classification
- Kingdom: Animalia
- Phylum: Mollusca
- Class: Gastropoda
- Subclass: Vetigastropoda
- Order: Lepetellida
- Family: Fissurellidae
- Genus: Fissurisepta
- Species: F. granulosa

Binomial name
- Fissurisepta granulosa Jeffreys, 1883

= Fissurisepta granulosa =

Species of gastropod

Fissurisepta granulosa is a species of sea snail, a marine gastropod mollusk in the family Fissurellidae, the keyhole limpets. It is found in the northeast Atlantic Ocean and in the Mediterranean Sea.

== Description ==
The Fissurisepta granulosa has a rounded shell. Its diameter usually ranges from 3 - 4.5 mm.

== Distribution ==
This species of sea snail is found in the Mediterranean Sea and the northeast Atlantic Ocean, around Europe.
