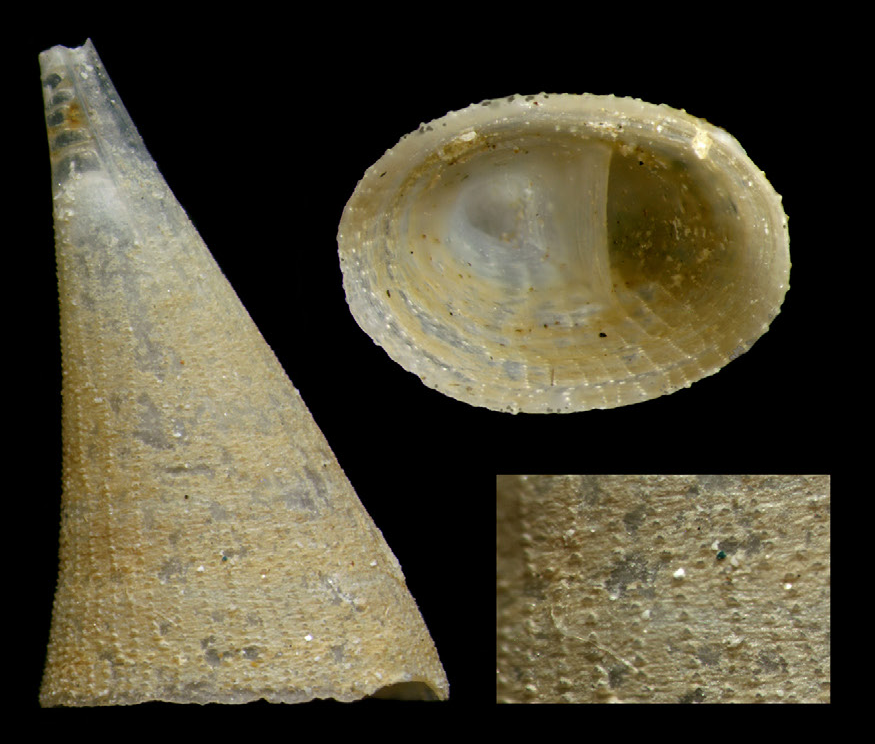

Scientific classification
- Kingdom: Animalia
- Phylum: Mollusca
- Class: Gastropoda
- Subclass: Vetigastropoda
- Order: Lepetellida
- Family: Fissurellidae
- Genus: Cornisepta
- Species: C. rostrata

Binomial name
- Cornisepta rostrata (Seguenza, 1862)

Synonyms
- Fissurisepta rostrata Seguenza, 1862; Fissurisepta rostrata var. elata Seguenza, 1862; Puncturella (Fissurella) rostrata Watson, 1886

= Cornisepta rostrata =

Species of gastropod

Cornisepta rostrata is a species of sea snail, a marine gastropod mollusk in the family Fissurellidae, the keyhole limpets.

== Description ==
The height of the shell varies between 3.5 mm and 5 mm.

== Distribution ==
This species occurs in the northeastern Atlantic Ocean and in the Mediterranean Sea at depths between 100 m and 2,000 m.
