= Cornisepta verenae =

Scientific classification
- Kingdom: Animalia
- Phylum: Mollusca
- Class: Gastropoda
- Subclass: Vetigastropoda
- Order: Lepetellida
- Family: Fissurellidae
- Genus: Cornisepta
- Species: C. verenae

Binomial name
- Cornisepta verenae McLean & Geiger, 1998

Species of gastropod

Cornisepta verenae is a species of sea snail, a marine gastropod mollusk in the family Fissurellidae, the keyhole limpets.

== Description ==
The shell grows to a height of 1.6 mm.

== Distribution ==
This marine species occurs off the Juan de Fuca Ridge, northeast Pacific Ocean. It lives at a depth of 1,530 m.
