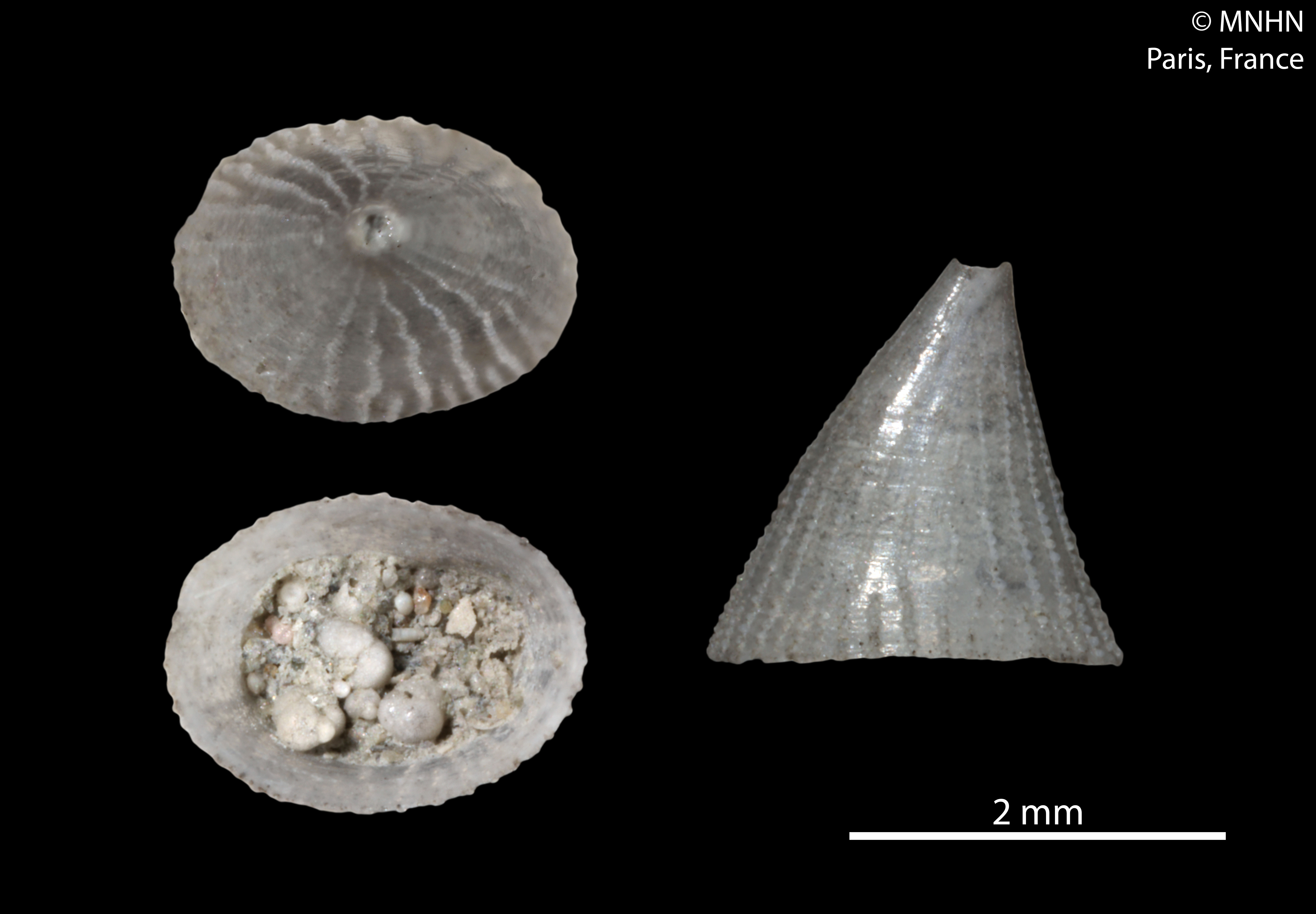

Scientific classification
- Kingdom: Animalia
- Phylum: Mollusca
- Class: Gastropoda
- Subclass: Vetigastropoda
- Order: Lepetellida
- Family: Fissurellidae
- Genus: Cornisepta
- Species: C. monsfuji

Binomial name
- Cornisepta monsfuji Chino, 2009

= Cornisepta monsfuji =

Species of gastropod

Cornisepta monsfuji is a species of sea snail, a marine gastropod mollusk in the family Fissurellidae, the keyhole limpets.

== Description ==
The shell can grow to be 1.8 mm in length.

== Distribution ==
This marine species occurs off Japan.
