= Fissurisepta manawatawhia =

Scientific classification
- Kingdom: Animalia
- Phylum: Mollusca
- Class: Gastropoda
- Subclass: Vetigastropoda
- Order: Lepetellida
- Family: Fissurellidae
- Genus: Fissurisepta
- Species: F. manawatawhia

Binomial name
- Fissurisepta manawatawhia (Powell, 1937)

Species of gastropod

Fissurisepta manawatawhia is a species of keyhole limpet, a marine gastropod mollusc in the family Fissurellidae.
