= Laubellidae =

Scientific classification
- Kingdom: Animalia
- Phylum: Mollusca
- Class: Gastropoda
- Subclass: Vetigastropoda
- Superfamily: Seguenzioidea
- Family: †Laubellidae; Cox, 1960

Extinct family of gastropods

Laubellidae is an extinct family of sea snails, marine gastropod mollusks in the clade Vetigastropoda (according to the taxonomy of the Gastropoda by Bouchet & Rocroi, 2005).

This family has no subfamilies.

== Genera ==
Genera within the family Laubellidae include:

- Laubella Kittl, 1891 - the type genus of the family
