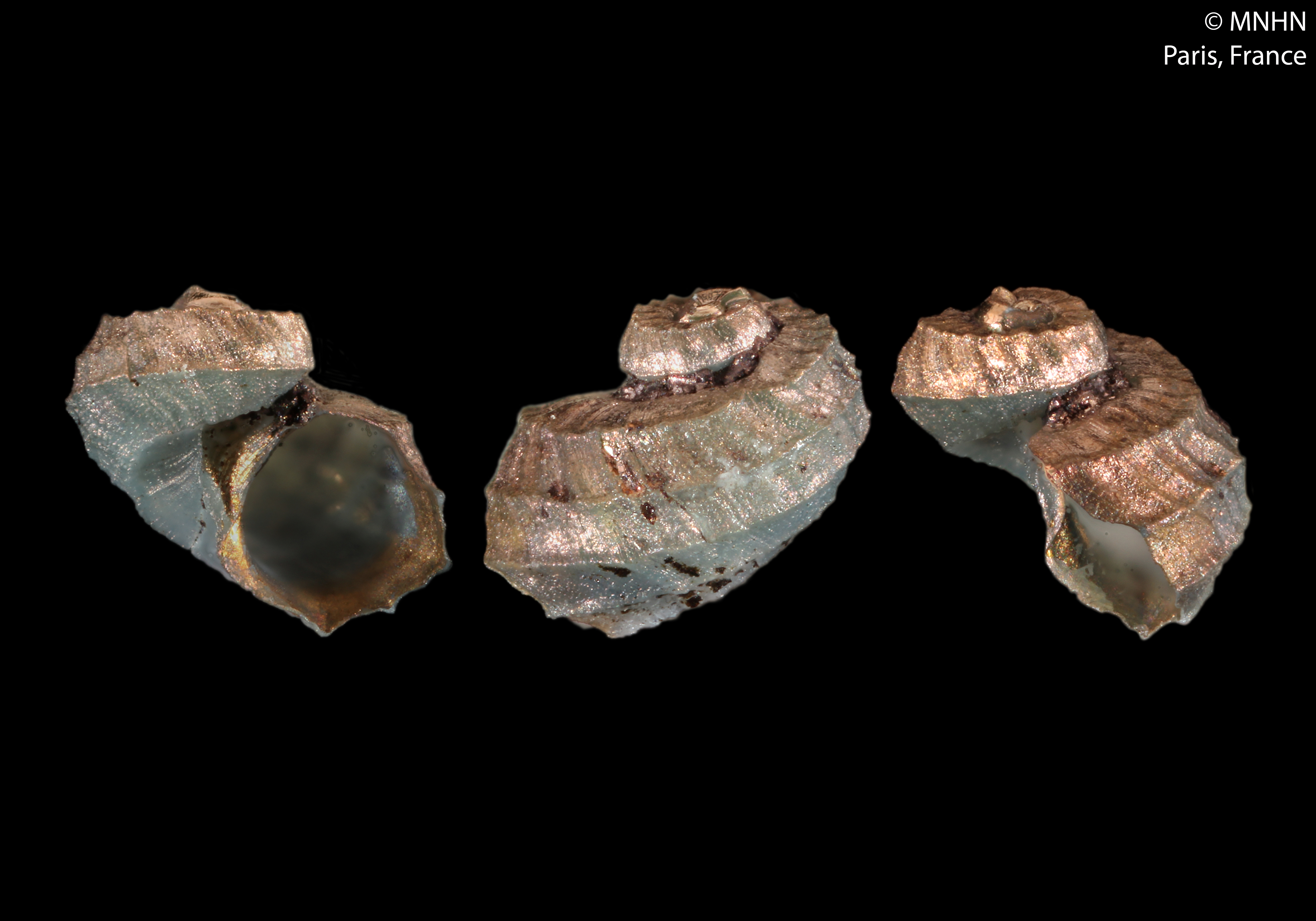
- Ventsia tricarinata

Scientific classification
- Kingdom: Animalia
- Phylum: Mollusca
- Class: Gastropoda
- Subclass: Vetigastropoda
- Superfamily: Seguenzioidea
- Family: incertae sedis
- Genus: Ventsia; Warén & Bouchet, 1993

Type species
- Ventsia tricarinata Warén & Bouchet, 1993

= Ventsia =

Genus of sea snails

Ventsia is a genus of sea snails, marine gastropod mollusks, unassigned in the superfamily Seguenzioidea.

== Species ==
Species within the genus Ventsia include:

- Ventsia hollanderi Fernández-Garcés, Rubio & Rolán, 2019
- Ventsia tricarinata Warén & Bouchet, 1993
