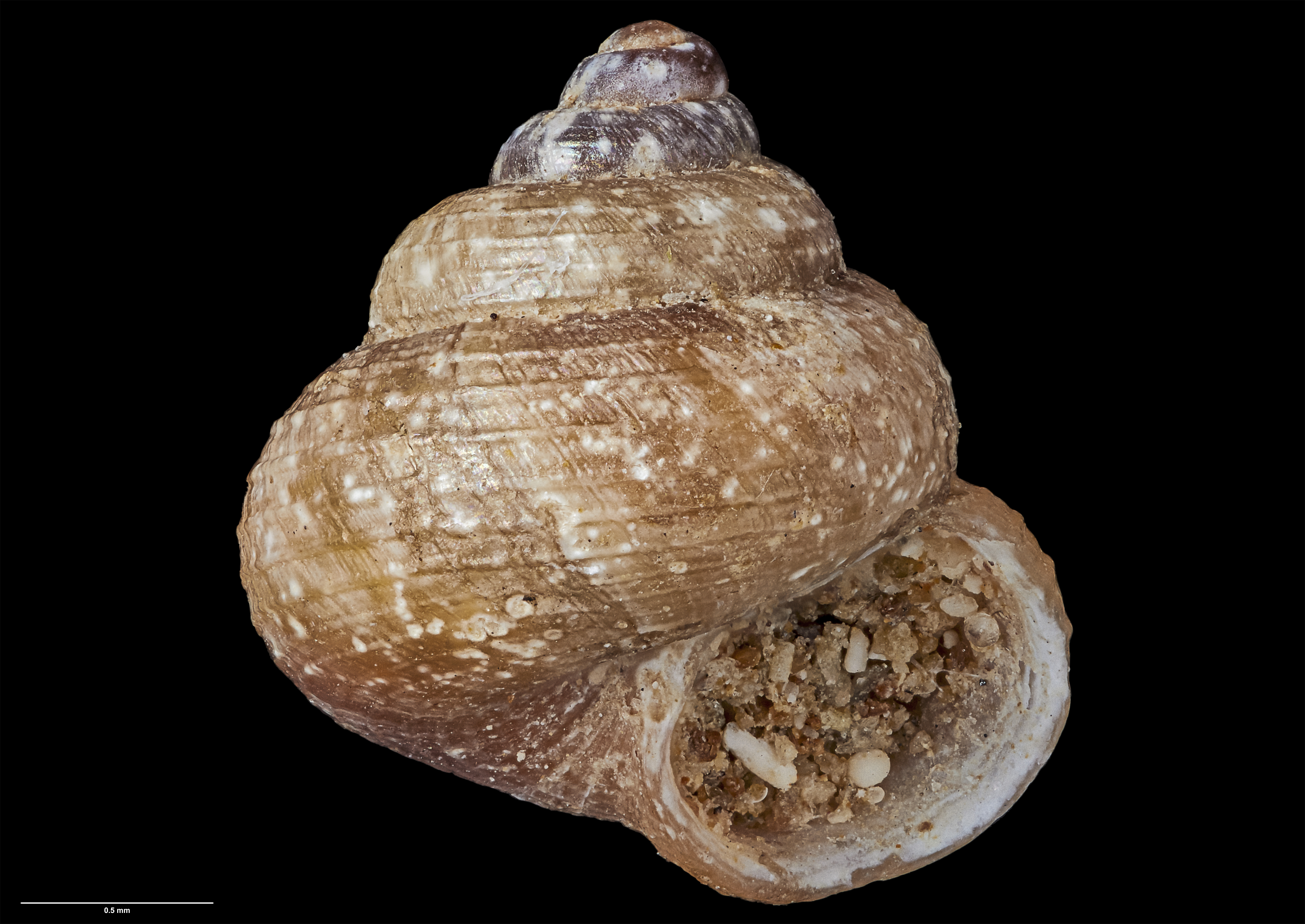
- Holotype of Lissotestella tryphenensis

Scientific classification
- Kingdom: Animalia
- Phylum: Mollusca
- Class: Gastropoda
- Subclass: Vetigastropoda
- Family: incertae sedis
- Genus: Lissotestella; Powell, 1946

Type species
- Lissotestella tenuilirata A. W. B. Powell, 1931

= Lissotestella =

Lissotestella Temporal range: Eocene–Recent

Genus of gastropods

Lissotestella is a genus of minute sea snails or micromolluscs, marine gastropod molluscs, unassigned in the superfamily Seguenzioidea. First described by A. W. B. Powell in 1946, the genus is endemic to the waters surrounding New Zealand.

== Description ==
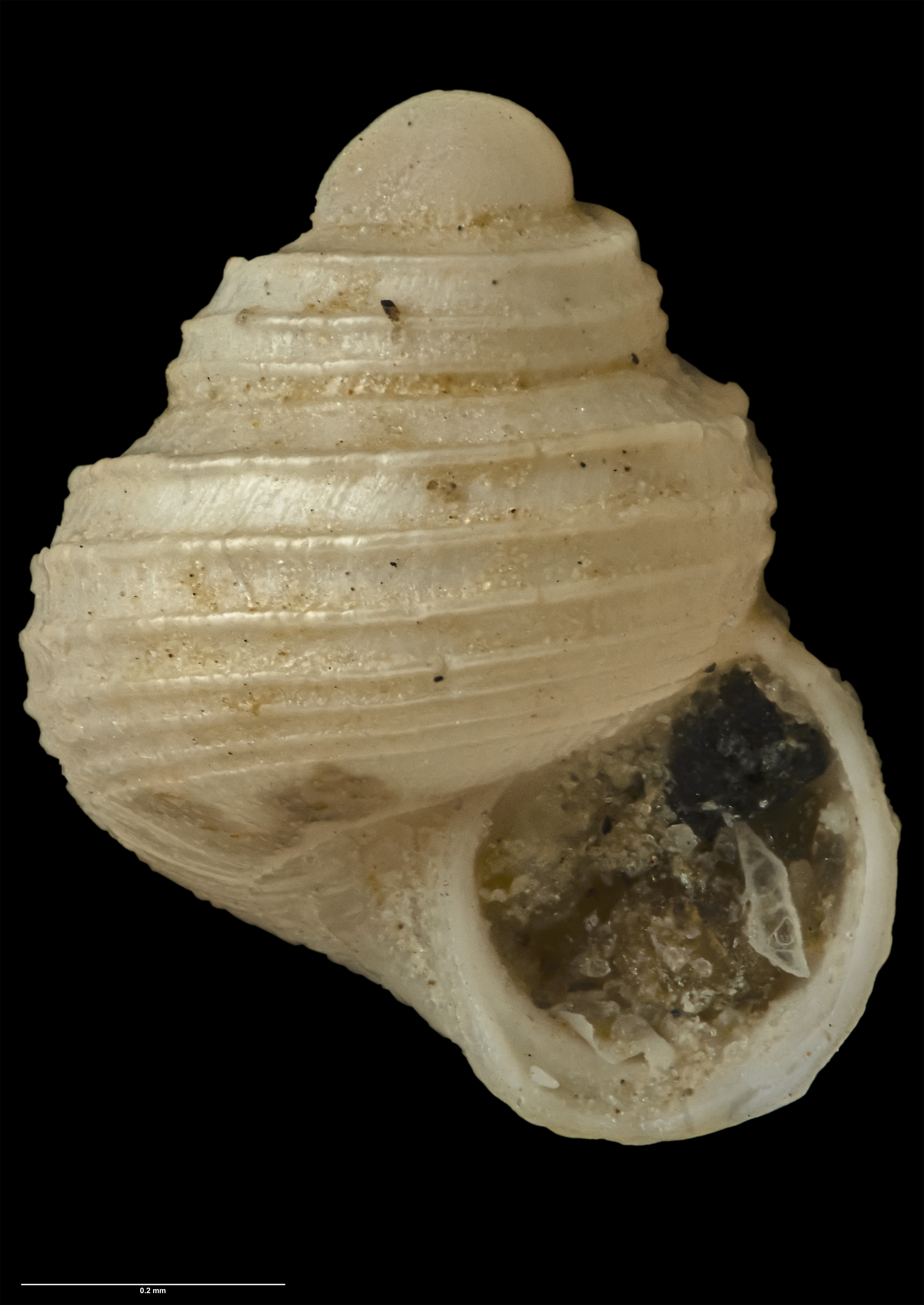
Holotype of Lissotestella consobrina

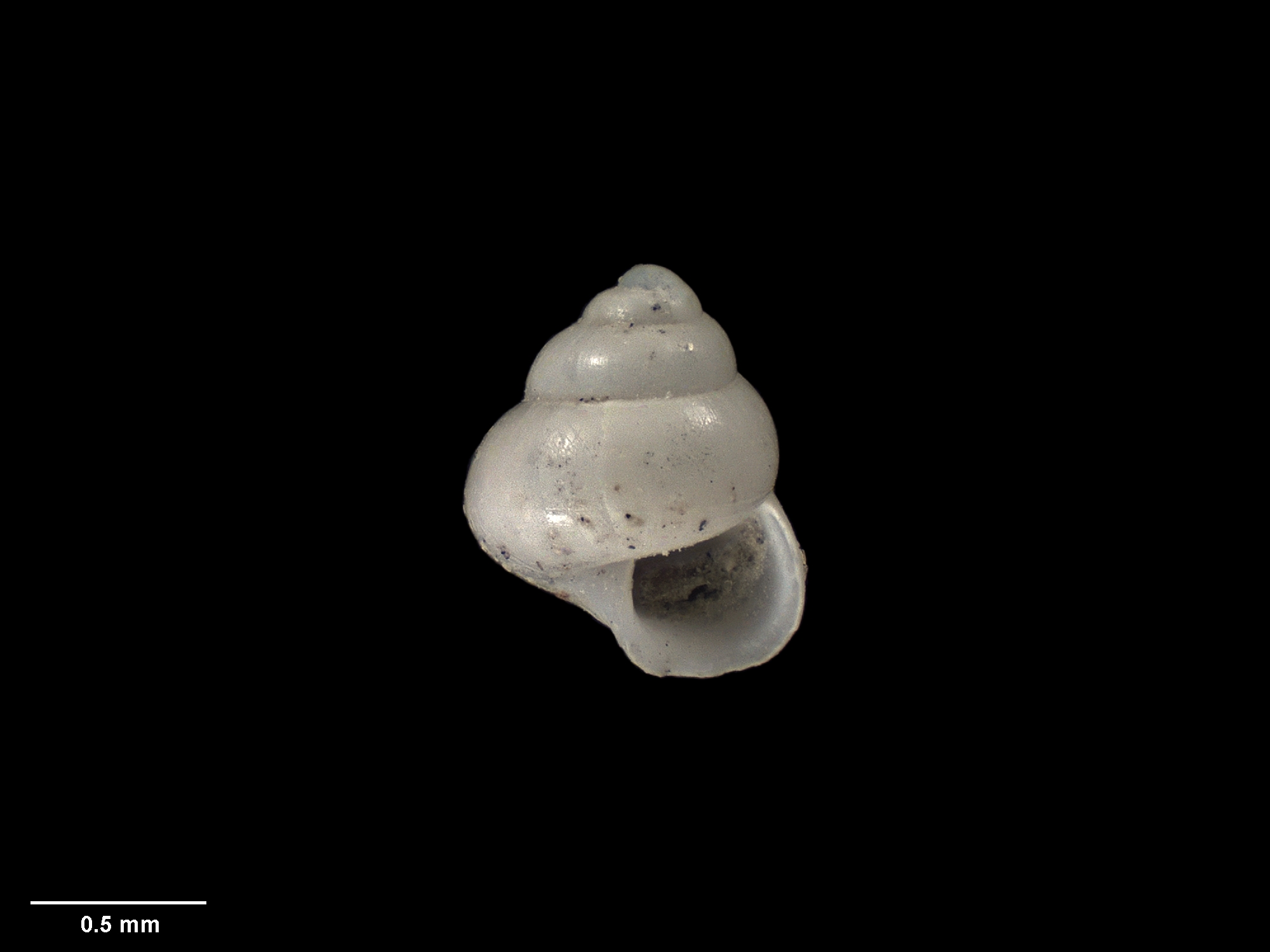
Holotype of Lissotestella cookiana

In the original description, Powell described the genus as below:

This new genus resembles Lissotesta in shape, but it is of more solid texture. The surface, instead of being polished, is dull and regularly spirally lirate. In Lissotesta the peristome is thin and not continuous. That of the new genus is continued across the parietal wall, and is strengthened on the outside by a broad low varix. Inside the aperture there is a slight rim or ledge which suggests the presence of a stout operculum—possibly a calcareous one, and, if this should prove to be the case, removal of the genus to the vicinity of Argolista may be necessary. The protoconch is of one whorl and is larger and more globose than in Lissotesta.

The genus' protoconch is bluntly rounded, having approximately 1.5 smooth whorls, and typically has a slight ledge within its peristome, and a rounded variciform swelling found behind the outer lip. Members of the genus are turbiniform and narrowly umbilicate. The protoconch is large, swollen, dome-shaped, with a sculpture of fine anastomosing ridges. The genus has convex teleoconch whorls that are sculptured with either spiral cords or lirae. Members of the genus have heights that vary between 0.85–2.2 mm (0.033–0.087 in).

The genus can be differentiated from Lissotesta due to Lissotestella having stronger umbilicus spirals, and the presence of a varix on the outer lip.

== Taxonomy ==
Lissotestella was first described by Baden Powell in 1946, naming Lissotestella tenuilirata as the type species. The genus was previously placed in the family Skeneidae, and in 2002, in the former taxonomic order Archaeogastropoda by Jack Sepkoski. In 2009, the genus was placed within the superfamily Seguenzioidea as a "plausible member" of the group, with the genus remaining unassigned within the superfamily. Holotypes of two species of Lissotestella are held by the Auckland War Memorial Museum, two by the Canterbury Museum, one by the Natural History Museum, London, and one by Te Papa.

== Distribution ==
Lissotestella is endemic to New Zealand, with fossils dating back likely to the Kaiatan stage of the Eocene. While L. tenuilirata has a wide distribution across New Zealand waters, including the Auckland Islands, and Chatham Islands, many members are only known to occur in restricted ranges, including L. caelata near Manawatāwhi / Three Kings Islands, L. cookiana in the Cook Strait, L. tryphenensis near Great Barrier Island, and L. rissoaformis in the Auckland Islands.

== Species ==
Species within the genus Lissotestella include:

- † Lissotestella alpha Laws, 1939
- † Lissotestella basispiralis Maxwell, 1992
- Lissotestella caelata Powell, 1937
- Lissotestella consobrina Powell, 1940
- Lissotestella cookiana Dell, 1956
- Lissotestella rissoaformis Powell, 1931
- Lissotestella tenuilirata Powell, 1931
- Lissotestella tryphenensis Powell, 1937
- † Lissotestella waimamakuensis Laws, 1948
