= Cornisepta levinae =

Scientific classification
- Kingdom: Animalia
- Phylum: Mollusca
- Class: Gastropoda
- Subclass: Vetigastropoda
- Order: Lepetellida
- Family: Fissurellidae
- Genus: Cornisepta
- Species: C. levinae

Binomial name
- Cornisepta levinae McLean & Geiger, 1998

Species of gastropod

Cornisepta levinae is a species of sea snail, a marine gastropod mollusk in the family Fissurellidae, the keyhole limpets.

== Description ==
The shell grows to a height of 5 mm (0.20 in).

== Distribution ==
This marine species occurs off the East Pacific Rise, a mid-ocean ridge.
