= Cornisepta acuminata =

Scientific classification
- Kingdom: Animalia
- Phylum: Mollusca
- Class: Gastropoda
- Subclass: Vetigastropoda
- Order: Lepetellida
- Family: Fissurellidae
- Genus: Cornisepta
- Species: C. acuminata

Binomial name
- Cornisepta acuminata (Watson, 1883)

Synonyms
- Fissurisepta acuminata (Watson, 1883); Fissurisepta triangulata (Dall, 1889); Puncturella (Fissurisepta) acuminata Watson, 1883 (original combination); Puncturella rostrata auct. non Seguenza, 1863; Puncturella (Fissurisepta) triangulata Dall, 1889

Species of gastropod

Cornisepta acuminata is a species of sea snail, a marine gastropod mollusk in the family Fissurellidae, the keyhole limpets.

== Description ==
The height of the shell varies between 3 mm and 5 mm.

== Distribution ==
This species occurs in the Atlantic Ocean from Southeast USA to Central Brazil; in the Gulf of Mexico, and the Caribbean Sea.
