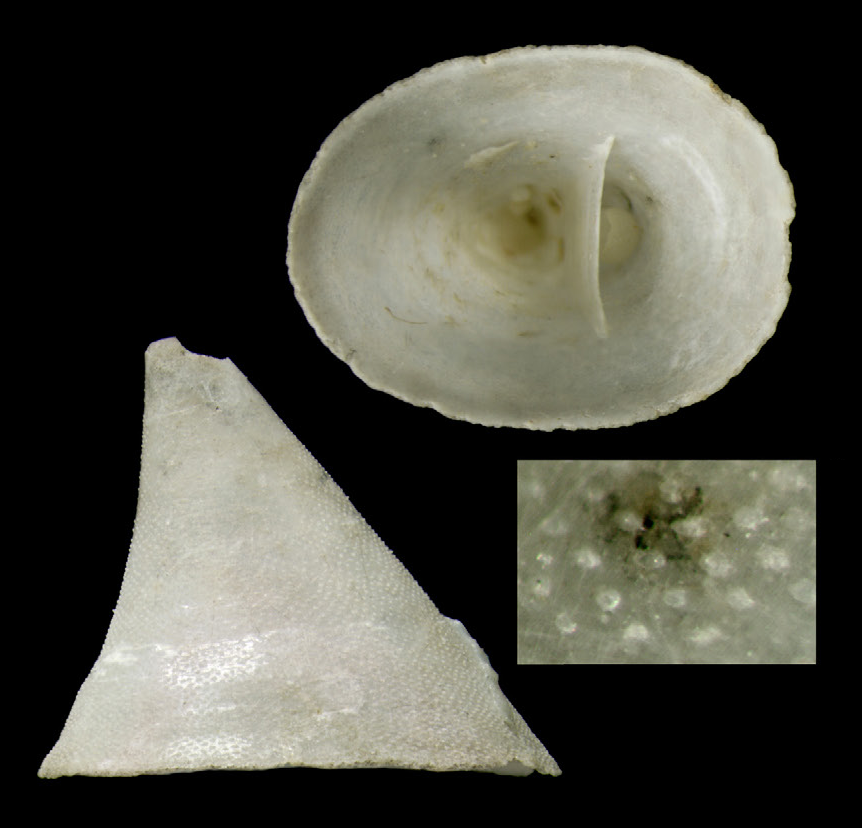

Scientific classification
- Kingdom: Animalia
- Phylum: Mollusca
- Class: Gastropoda
- Subclass: Vetigastropoda
- Order: Lepetellida
- Family: Fissurellidae
- Genus: Cornisepta
- Species: C. microphyma

Binomial name
- Cornisepta microphyma (Dautzenberg & H. Fischer, 1896)

Synonyms
- Fissurisepta microphyma (Dautzenberg & H. Fischer, 1896); Puncturella microphyma Dautzenberg & H. Fischer, 1896

= Cornisepta microphyma =

Species of gastropod

Cornisepta microphyma is a species of sea snail, a marine gastropod mollusk in the family Fissurellidae, the keyhole limpets.

== Description ==
The shell grows to a height of 6 mm.

== Distribution ==
This species occurs in the Atlantic Ocean off the Azores and on the Galicia Bank (Northeast Atlantic Ocean).
