= Cornisepta antarctica =

Scientific classification
- Kingdom: Animalia
- Phylum: Mollusca
- Class: Gastropoda
- Subclass: Vetigastropoda
- Order: Lepetellida
- Family: Fissurellidae
- Subfamily: Zeidorinae
- Genus: Cornisepta
- Species: C. antarctica

Binomial name
- Cornisepta antarctica (Egorova, 1972)

Synonyms
- Fissurisepta antarctica Egorova, 1972 (original combination)

Species of gastropod

Cornisepta antarctica is a species of sea snail, a marine gastropod mollusk in the family Fissurellidae, the keyhole limpets and slit limpets.

== Description ==
The shell grows to a height of 8 mm.

== Distribution ==
This species occurs in Antarctic waters of the Weddell Sea.
