= Cornisepta festiva =

Scientific classification
- Kingdom: Animalia
- Phylum: Mollusca
- Class: Gastropoda
- Subclass: Vetigastropoda
- Order: Lepetellida
- Family: Fissurellidae
- Subfamily: Zeidorinae
- Genus: Cornisepta
- Species: C. festiva

Binomial name
- Cornisepta festiva (Crozier, 1966)

Synonyms
- Fissurisepta festiva Crozier, 1966

Species of gastropod

Cornisepta festiva is a species of sea snail, a marine gastropod mollusk in the family Fissurellidae, the keyhole limpets and slit limpets.

== Description ==
The shell grows to a height of 5 mm.

== Distribution ==
This marine species is endemic to New Zealand.
