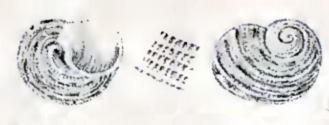
- Drawing of a shell of Hybochelus cancellatus with in detail its sculpture.

Scientific classification
- Kingdom: Animalia
- Phylum: Mollusca
- Class: Gastropoda
- Subclass: Vetigastropoda
- Family: Chilodontaidae
- Genus: Hybochelus
- Species: H. cancellatus

Binomial name
- Hybochelus cancellatus (Krauss, 1848)

Synonyms
- Euchelus cancellatus (Krauss, 1848); Stomatella cancellata Krauss, 1848; Trochus (Euchelus) fossulatulus Souverbie in Souverbie & Montrouzier, 1875; Trochus fossulatulus Souverbie in Souverbie & Montrouzier, 1875

= Hybochelus cancellatus =

Species of gastropod

Hybochelus cancellatus is a species of sea snail, a marine gastropod mollusc in the family Chilodontaidae.

== Description ==
The size of the shell varies between 10 mm and 20 mm. The depressed, umbilicate shell is helicoid or almost stomatia-shaped. The body whorl and aperture are very large. Its color is reddish-brown, marked with white on the spiral ribs. The small spire is very short. The four whorls are convex, the inner 1½ are smooth, the rest have strong, separated spiral lirae, the interstices wider than the lirae, rendered pitted by raised, regular rib-striae each interliral interval with a central spiral thread. There are 3 principal lirae on the penultimate whorl. The outer lip is inserted on the fourth. On the base of the shell there are 8 concentric lirae, alternately larger and smaller, the inner one bounding the umbilicus and spirally entering it. The large aperture is oblique, finely sulcate, pearly and iridescent inside. The outer lip is thin. The columella is arcuate, not toothed, a trifle reflexed above, connected with the upper lip by a short, shining, white callus. The narrow umbilicus is funnel-shaped.

== Distribution ==
This marine species occurs off the Philippines and Australia. It was previously erroneously described from the Cape of Good Hope, South Africa.
