= Cornisepta pacifica =

Scientific classification
- Kingdom: Animalia
- Phylum: Mollusca
- Class: Gastropoda
- Subclass: Vetigastropoda
- Order: Lepetellida
- Family: Fissurellidae
- Subfamily: Zeidorinae
- Genus: Cornisepta
- Species: C. pacifica

Binomial name
- Cornisepta pacifica (Cowan, 1969)

Synonyms
- Fissurisepta pacifica Cowan, 1969; Puncturella pacifica Cowan, 1969

Species of gastropod

Cornisepta pacifica is a species of sea snail, a marine gastropod mollusc in the family Fissurellidae, the keyhole limpets and slit limpets.
