= Cornisepta fumarium =

Scientific classification
- Kingdom: Animalia
- Phylum: Mollusca
- Class: Gastropoda
- Subclass: Vetigastropoda
- Order: Lepetellida
- Family: Fissurellidae
- Subfamily: Zeidorinae
- Genus: Cornisepta
- Species: C. fumarium

Binomial name
- Cornisepta fumarium (Hedley, 1911)

Synonyms
- Fissurisepta fumarium (Hedley, 1911); Puncturella fumarium Hedley, 1911

Species of gastropod

Cornisepta fumarium is a species of sea snail, a marine gastropod mollusk in the family Fissurellidae, the keyhole limpets and slit limpets.
