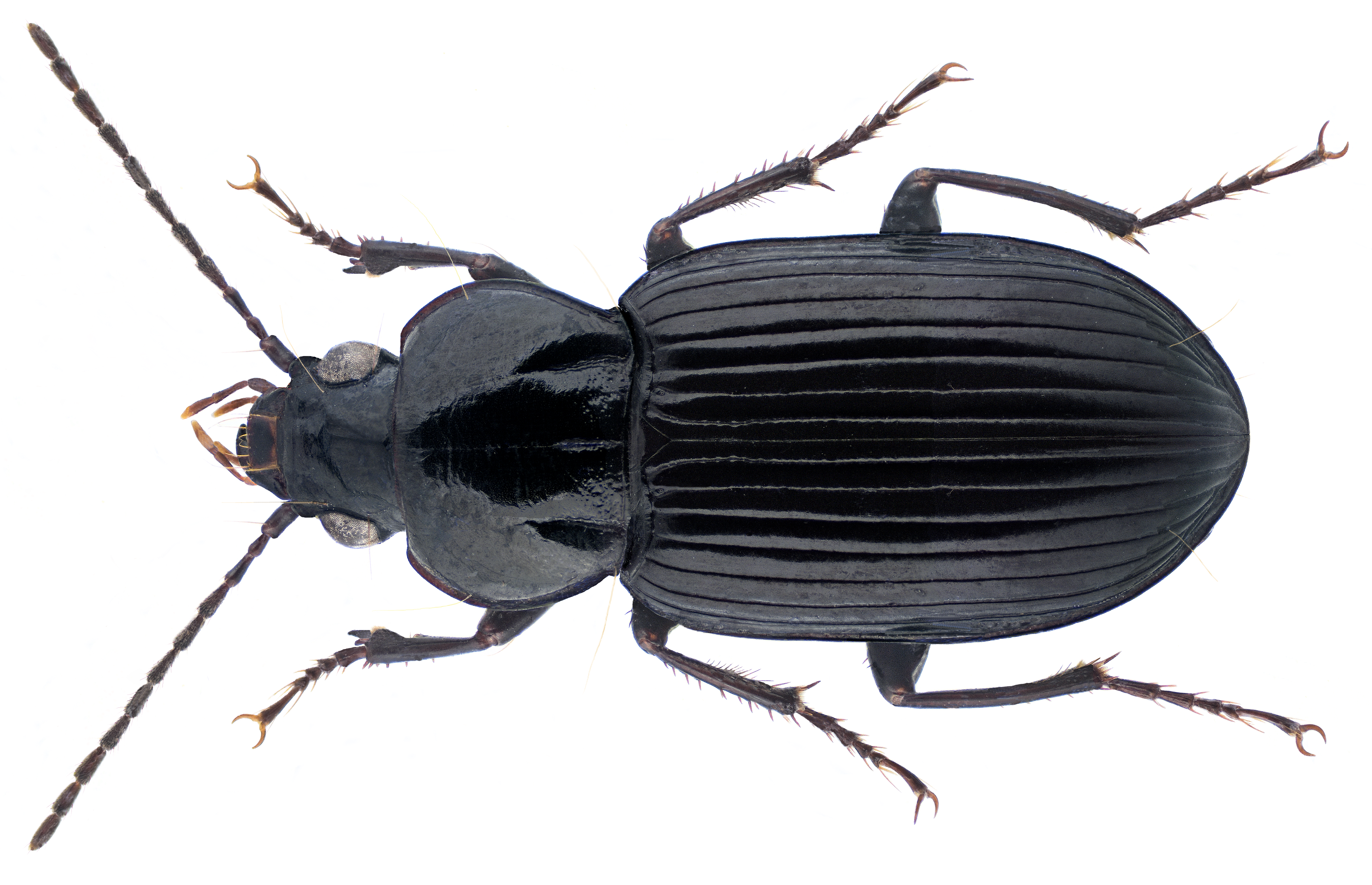

Scientific classification
- Kingdom: Animalia
- Phylum: Arthropoda
- Class: Insecta
- Order: Coleoptera
- Suborder: Adephaga
- Family: Carabidae
- Genus: Abacetus
- Species: A. crenulatus

Binomial name
- Abacetus crenulatus Dejean, 1831

= Abacetus crenulatus =

Species of beetle

Abacetus crenulatus is a species of ground beetle in the subfamily Pterostichinae. It was described by the French entomologist Pierre François Marie Auguste Dejean in 1831. It is one of a number of predacious soil surface-dwelling beetles in West African rice ecosystems, detected in insect surveys in rice paddies in Cameroon looking for beetles that can help reduce pest numbers in field crops.
