= Cornisepta onychoides =

Scientific classification
- Kingdom: Animalia
- Phylum: Mollusca
- Class: Gastropoda
- Subclass: Vetigastropoda
- Order: Lepetellida
- Family: Fissurellidae
- Subfamily: Zeidorinae
- Genus: Cornisepta
- Species: C. onychoides

Binomial name
- Cornisepta onychoides (D. G. Herbert & Kilburn, 1986)

Species of gastropod

Cornisepta onychoides is a species of sea snail, a marine gastropod mollusk in the family Fissurellidae, the keyhole limpets and slit limpets.
