= Eudaroniidae =

Scientific classification
- Domain: Eukaryota
- Kingdom: Animalia
- Phylum: Mollusca
- Class: Gastropoda
- Subclass: Vetigastropoda
- Superfamily: Seguenzioidea
- Family: Eudaroniidae; Gründel, 2004

Family of sea snails

Eudaroniidae is a family of gastropods belonging to the order Seguenziida. The family consists of only one genus: Eudaronia Cotton, 1945.
