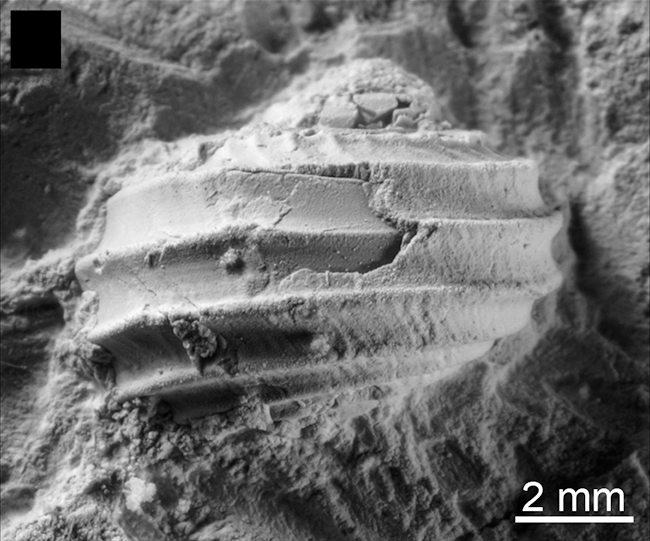
- fossil Cataegis godineauensis from the late Miocene

Scientific classification
- Kingdom: Animalia
- Phylum: Mollusca
- Class: Gastropoda
- Subclass: Vetigastropoda
- Superfamily: Seguenzioidea
- Family: Cataegidae; McLean & Quinn, 1987

= Cataegidae =

Family of gastropods

Cataegidae is a family of small sea snails, marine gastropod mollusks in the superfamily Seguenzioidea.

== Taxonomy ==
=== 2005 taxonomy ===
Cataegidae was classified as the subfamily Cataeginae within Chilodontidae according to the taxonomy of the Gastropoda by Bouchet & Rocroi, 2005.

=== 2009 taxonomy ===
Kano et al. (2009) elevated the subfamily Cataeginae to the family level.

== Genera ==
Genera within the family Cataegidae include:

- Cataegis McLean & Quinn, 1987
- Kanoia Warén & Rouse, 2016
- Nemocataegis Hickman, 2017
