= Giuseppe Seguenza =

Italian naturalist and geologist

- Born: June 8, 1833
- Died: February 3, 1889 (aged 55); Messina, Italy
- Education: University of Messina
- Known for: Studies of Geology and Fossils
- Awards: Silver medal (Exhibition in Paris), Wollaston Medal (Geological Society of London)
- Scientific career
- Fields: Paleontology, Mineralogy, Botany
- Website: Seguenza Liceie di Messina

Giuseppe Seguenza (June 8, 1833 in Messina – February 3, 1889 in Messina) was an Italian naturalist and geologist.

== Early life ==
Giuseppe Seguenza was born on June 8, 1833, in Italy. Because his father expected him to follow in his footsteps and become a pharmacist, Seguenza studied under his father, who also owned his own pharmacy.

Later, Seguenza chose to study the geological and mineralogical sciences.

== Scientific research ==
At the age of 23, Giuseppe Seguenza discovered that all the products of the emanations of Vulcano (one of the Aeolian Islands) contained arsenic compounds. Afterward, he published other scientific works that earned him the attention of scholars in Europe and the silver medal at the Paris Exposition.

He was appointed Professor of Natural History at the Maurolico School, then the Technical Institute of Messina, and finally earned a professorship at the University of Messina.

There followed other work around the metalliferous deposits of Fiumedinisi, land and fossils of the territory of Messina, and Calabria, which were awarded and published at his own expense by the Royal Academy of the Lincei.

In 1868 he introduced the Zanclean stage to define the early part of the Pliocene. A genus of sea snails, known as Seguenzia (family Seguenziidae), was named in his honor.

== Family and legacy ==
Giuseppe Seguenza died at the age of 58 and his son, Luigi Seguenza, continued forward his work. Luigi is known for having defined the taxonomy for Calliotropis, a genus of sea snails.

One of the three science high schools in Messina, Liceo Scientifico G. Seguenza, is named after Giuseppe. The museum of modern people of Nizza di Sicilia is also dedicated to him.

== Selected works ==
- Disquisizioni paleontologiche intorno ai corallarii fossili delle rocce terziarie del distretto di Messina, 1863.
- Paleontologia malacologica dei terreni terziarii del distretto di Messina, 1865.
- Le formazioni Terziarie nella Provincia di Reggio (Calabria), 1877 – Tertiary formations in the Province of Reggio Calabria.
- Studi geologici e paleontologici sul cretaceo medio dell'Italia meridionale, 1878 – Geological and paleontological studies on the Middle Cretaceous of southern Italy.
