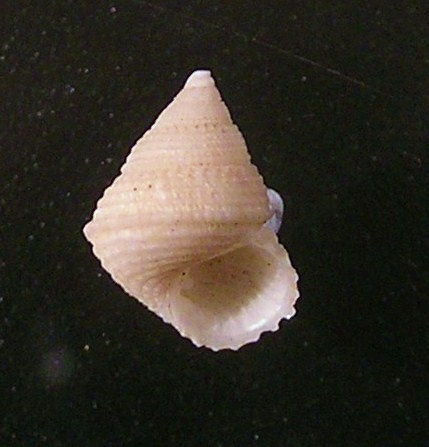
- An apertural view of a shell of Perrinia concinna (family Chilodontidae)

Scientific classification
- Kingdom: Animalia
- Phylum: Mollusca
- Class: Gastropoda
- Subclass: Vetigastropoda
- Superfamily: Seguenzioidea; Verrill, 1884

Families
- See text

= Seguenzioidea =

Seguenzioidea Temporal range: Cretaceous–Recent

Superfamily of gastropods

Seguenzioidea is a superfamily of sea snails, marine gastropod mollusks in the clade Vetigastropoda.

== Description ==
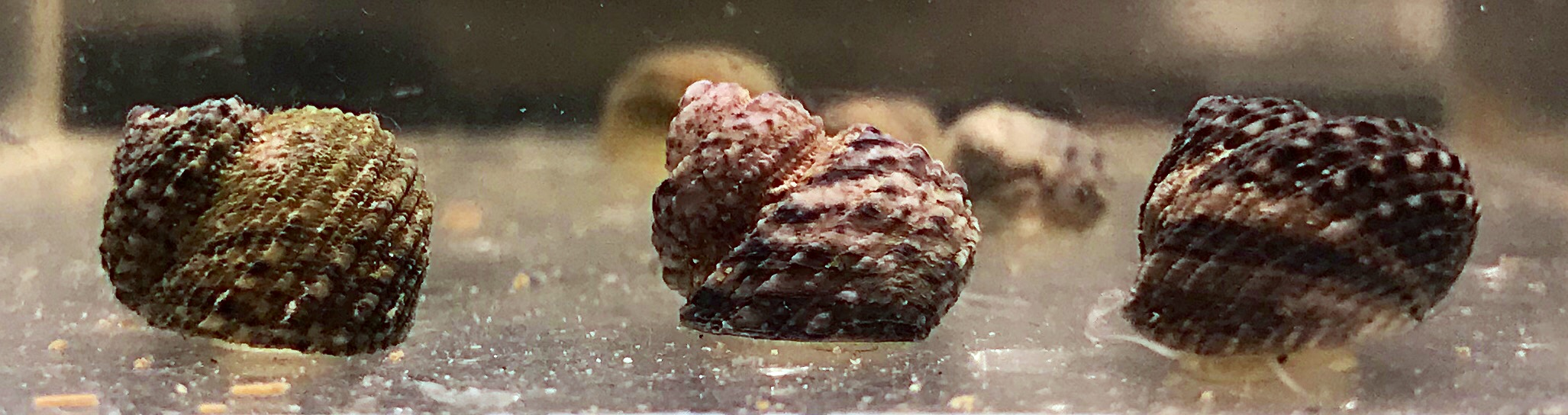
Three Seguenziid gastropods

The distinctive characteristics of the shells of the Seguenzioidea are:

- the nacreous layer (a plesiomorphic character, i.e. a character state that a taxon is inferred to have been retained from its ancestors) This occurs also in the following families: Pleurotomariidae, Haliotidae, Turbinidae, Trochidae, and possibly in the Skeneidae.
- the protoconch has a trochoid shape.
- usually with one or more labral sinuses. This character is also found is several other superfamilies such as Neomphaloidea, Pleurotomarioidea, Fissurelloidea, and Scissurelloidea and in the families Siliquariidae and Turridae. Therefore, this characteristic is to be considered autapomorphic.
- a unique radular formula with an underlying rhipidoglossate ground plan.

== Taxonomy ==
Seguenzioidea was placed in part or in whole previously to 1979 either in the Archaeogastropoda near the superfamily Trochoidea or in the Caenogastropoda near the superfamily Stromboidea. In 1987 Salvini-Plawén and Haszprunar changed its status to the suborder Seguenziina, based on the radular formula that they considered to be intermediate between "rhipidoglossate" and "taenioglossate". At about the same time in 1987 Goryachev elevated the superfamily to ordinal status Seguenziiformes in the superorder Littorinimorpha, based on the taenioglossal radula.

=== 2005 taxonomy ===
2005 taxonomy according to Bouchet & Rocroi, 2005. (Families that are exclusively fossil are indicated with a dagger †.)

Superfamily Seguenzioidea

Family Seguenziidae
Family Chilodontaidae
† Family Eucyclidae
† Family Laubellidae

=== 2007–2009 taxonomy ===
Kano et al. (2009) elevated the subfamily Calliotropinae to the family level as the Calliotropidae, and the subfamily Cataeginae to family level as the Cataegidae.

The superfamily Seguenzioidea consists of six families:

- Cataegidae McLean & Quinn, 1987
- Chilodontaidae Wenz, 1938
- Choristellidae Bouchet & Warén, 1979
- Eucyclidae Koken, 1896
- † Eucycloscalidae Gründel, 2007
- Eudaroniidae Gründel, 2004
- † Eunemopsidae Bandel, 2010
- † Lanascalidae Bandel, 1992
- † Laubellidae Cox, 1960
- Pendromidae Warén, 1991
- † Pseudoturcicidae Bandel, 2010
- † Sabrinellidae Bandel, 2010
- Seguenziidae Verrill, 1884
- Trochaclididae Thiele, 1928

Unassigned to a family

  - Adeuomphalus Seguenza, 1876
  - Aequispirella Finlay, 1924
  - Akritogyra Warén, 1992
  - Anekes Bouchet & Warén, 1979
  - Benthobrookula A. H. Clarke, 1961
  - Brookula Iredale, 1912
  - Eudaronia Cotton, 1945
  - Granigyra Dall, 1889
  - Lissotesta Iredale, 1915
  - Lissotestella Powell, 1946
  - Microcarina Laseron, 1954
  - Moelleriopsis Bush, 1897
  - Notosetia Iredale, 1915
  - Palazzia Warén, 1991
  - Putilla A. Adams, 1867
  - Retigyra Warén, 1989
  - Trenchia Knudsen, 1964
  - Ventsia Warén & Bouchet, 1993
  - Vetulonia Dall, 1913
  - Wanganella Laseron, 1954
  - Xyloskenea B. A. Marshall, 1988

Unassigned genera brought into synonymy

- Abyssogyra A.H. Clarke, 1961: synonym of Moelleriopsis Bush, 1897
- Intortia Egorova, 1972: synonym of Lissotesta Iredale, 1915
- Molleriopsis : synonym of Moelleriopsis Bush, 1897
