= Diodora bollonsi =

Scientific classification
- Kingdom: Animalia
- Phylum: Mollusca
- Class: Gastropoda
- Subclass: Vetigastropoda
- Order: Lepetellida
- Family: Fissurellidae
- Subfamily: Fissurellinae
- Genus: Diodora
- Species: D. bollonsi

Binomial name
- Diodora bollonsi (Oliver, 1915)

Species of gastropod

Diodora bollonsi is a species of sea snail, a marine gastropod mollusk in the family Fissurellidae, the keyhole limpets and slit limpets.

== Distribution ==
This marine species occurs off New Zealand.
