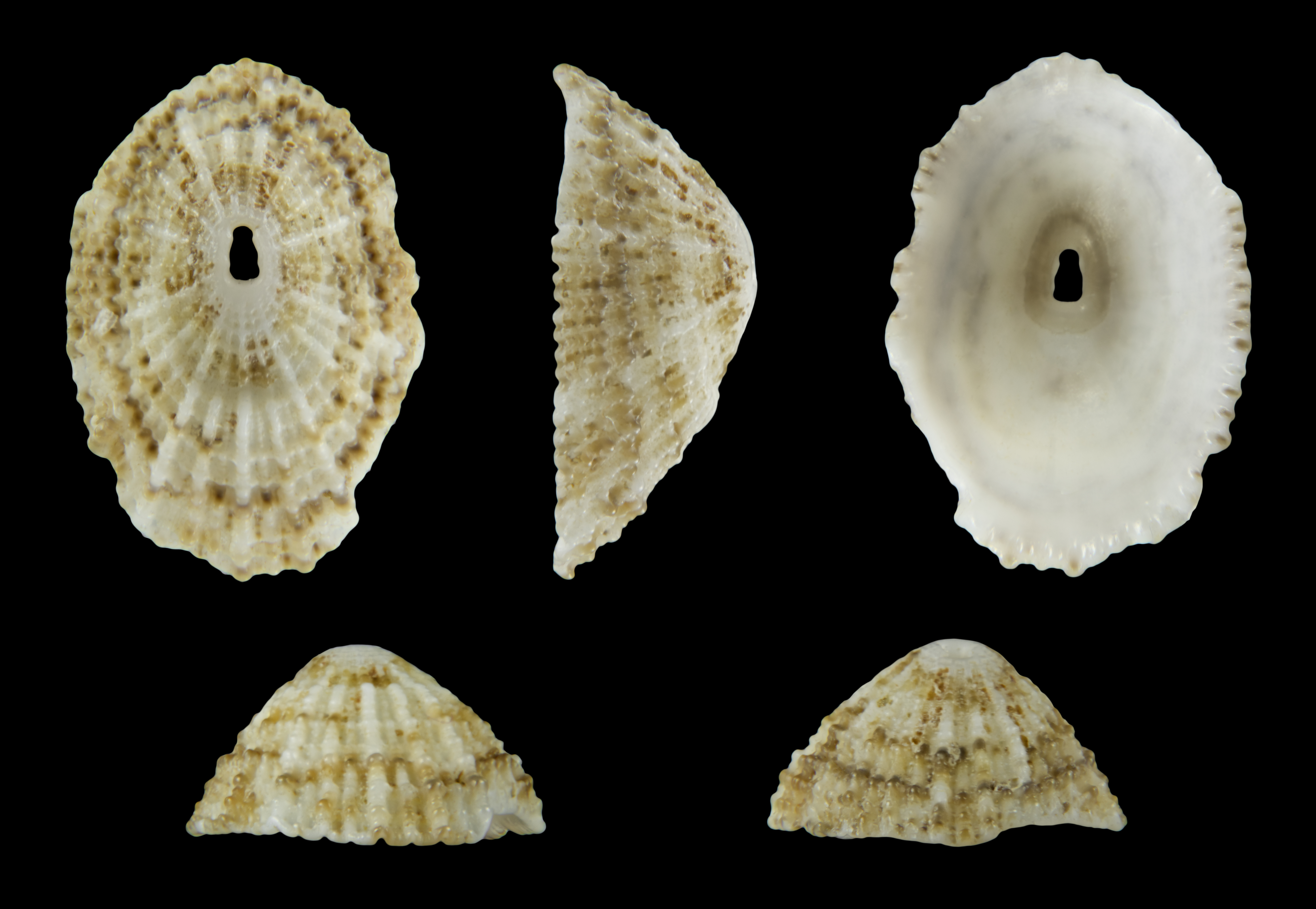

Scientific classification
- Kingdom: Animalia
- Phylum: Mollusca
- Class: Gastropoda
- Subclass: Vetigastropoda
- Order: Lepetellida
- Family: Fissurellidae
- Subfamily: Fissurellinae
- Genus: Diodora
- Species: D. ticaonica

Binomial name
- Diodora ticaonica (Reeve, 1850)

Synonyms
- Fissurella ticaonica Reeve, 1850

= Diodora ticaonica =

Species of gastropod

Diodora ticaonica is a species of sea snail, a marine gastropod mollusk in the family Fissurellidae, the keyhole limpets and slit limpets.
