= Diodora galeata =

Scientific classification
- Kingdom: Animalia
- Phylum: Mollusca
- Class: Gastropoda
- Subclass: Vetigastropoda
- Order: Lepetellida
- Family: Fissurellidae
- Subfamily: Fissurellinae
- Genus: Diodora
- Species: D. galeata

Binomial name
- Diodora galeata (Helbing, 1779)

Synonyms
- Patella galeata Helbing, 1779

Species of gastropod

Diodora galeata, common name the cup-shaped keyhole limpet, is a species of sea snail, a marine gastropod mollusk in the family Fissurellidae, the keyhole limpets and slit limpets.

== Description ==
The size of the shell varies between 10 mm and 20 mm.

== Distribution ==
This marine species occurs off the Philippines and Queensland, Australia.
