= Diodora fragilis =

Scientific classification
- Kingdom: Animalia
- Phylum: Mollusca
- Class: Gastropoda
- Subclass: Vetigastropoda
- Order: Lepetellida
- Family: Fissurellidae
- Genus: Diodora
- Species: D. fragilis

Binomial name
- Diodora fragilis Pérez Farfantee & Henríquez, 1947

Synonyms
- Diodora delicata Pérez Farfante & Henríquez, 1946, non Smith, 1889

Species of gastropod

Diodora fragilis is a species of sea snail, a marine gastropod mollusk in the family Fissurellidae, the keyhole limpets.

== Description ==
The size of the shell reaches 20 mm.

It consists of a conical shell, straight lateral slopes & slightly concave anterior and posterior slopes. The foramen is slightly constricted.

== Distribution ==
This species occurs in the Caribbean Sea off Cuba, in the Western Central Atlantic
