= Diodora fargoi =

Scientific classification
- Kingdom: Animalia
- Phylum: Mollusca
- Class: Gastropoda
- Subclass: Vetigastropoda
- Order: Lepetellida
- Family: Fissurellidae
- Subfamily: Fissurellinae
- Genus: Diodora
- Species: D. fargoi

Binomial name
- Diodora fargoi Olsson & McGinty, 1958

Species of gastropod

Diodora fargoi is a species of sea snail, a marine gastropod mollusk in the family Fissurellidae, the keyhole limpets and slit limpets.

== Description ==
The size of the shell reaches 9 mm.

== Distribution ==
This species occurs in the Caribbean Sea off Panama.
