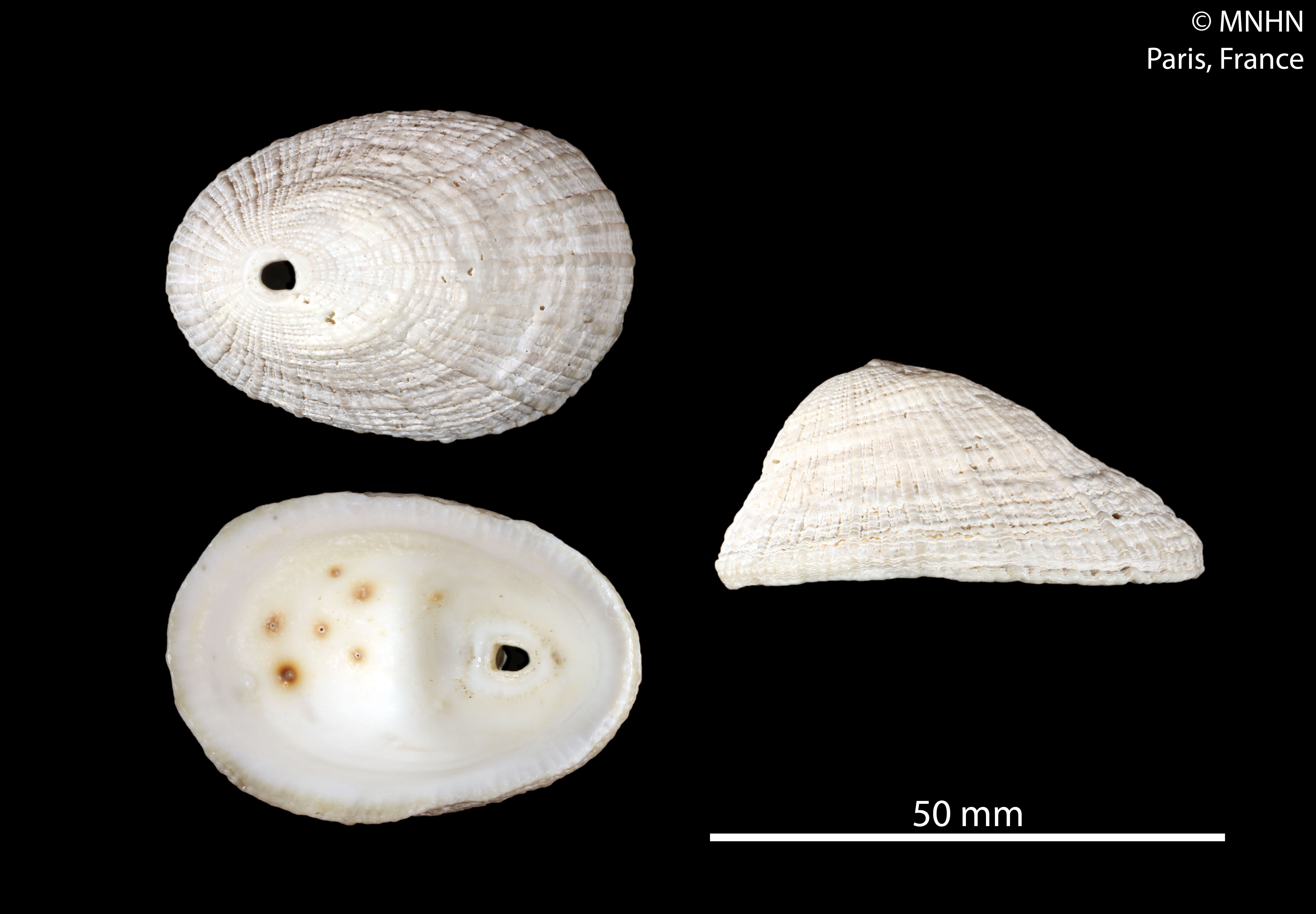
- 𝐷𝑖𝑜𝑑𝑜𝑟𝑎 𝑛𝑎𝑚𝑖𝑏𝑖𝑒𝑛𝑠𝑖𝑠

Scientific classification
- Kingdom: Animalia
- Phylum: Mollusca
- Class: Gastropoda
- Subclass: Vetigastropoda
- Order: Lepetellida
- Family: Fissurellidae
- Genus: Diodora
- Species: D. namibiensis

Binomial name
- Diodora namibiensis Poppe, Tagaro & Sarino, 2011

= Diodora namibiensis =

Species of gastropod

Diodora namibiensis is a species of sea snail, a marine gastropod mollusk in the family Fissurellidae, the keyhole limpets.

== Description ==
Shell rather large for the genus, very thick and solid, between 42.2 and 27.8 mm in length. Apical hole is diodorid in shape, situated to the anterior end of the shell.

== Distribution ==
The species is only known from the type locality, the Bosluis Bay near the Angolese border in northern Namibia.
