= Diodora demartiniorum =

Scientific classification
- Kingdom: Animalia
- Phylum: Mollusca
- Class: Gastropoda
- Subclass: Vetigastropoda
- Order: Lepetellida
- Family: Fissurellidae
- Genus: Diodora
- Species: D. demartiniorum

Binomial name
- Diodora demartiniorum Buzzurro & Russo, 2004

Species of gastropod

Diodora demartiniorum is a species of sea snail, a marine gastropod mollusk in the family Fissurellidae, the keyhole limpets.

== Description ==
The size of the shell varies between 20 mm and 37 mm. As broadcast spawners, their embryos develop into planktonic trocophore larvae and then into juvenile veligers before becoming grown adults.

== Distribution ==
This species was found in the Eastern Mediterranean Sea off Djerba, Tunisia.
