= Diodora bermudensis =

Scientific classification
- Kingdom: Animalia
- Phylum: Mollusca
- Class: Gastropoda
- Subclass: Vetigastropoda
- Order: Lepetellida
- Family: Fissurellidae
- Genus: Diodora
- Species: D. bermudensis

Binomial name
- Diodora bermudensis (Dall & Bartsch, 1911)

Synonyms
- Fissuridea bermudensis Dall & Bartsch, 1911

Species of gastropod

Diodora bermudensis is a species of sea snail, a marine gastropod mollusk in the family Fissurellidae, the keyhole limpets. Its common name is the Bermuda keyhole limpet.

== Description ==
The size of the shell reaches 5mm.

== Distribution ==
This species occurs in the Atlantic Ocean off Bermuda and Florida, and in the American Midwest.
