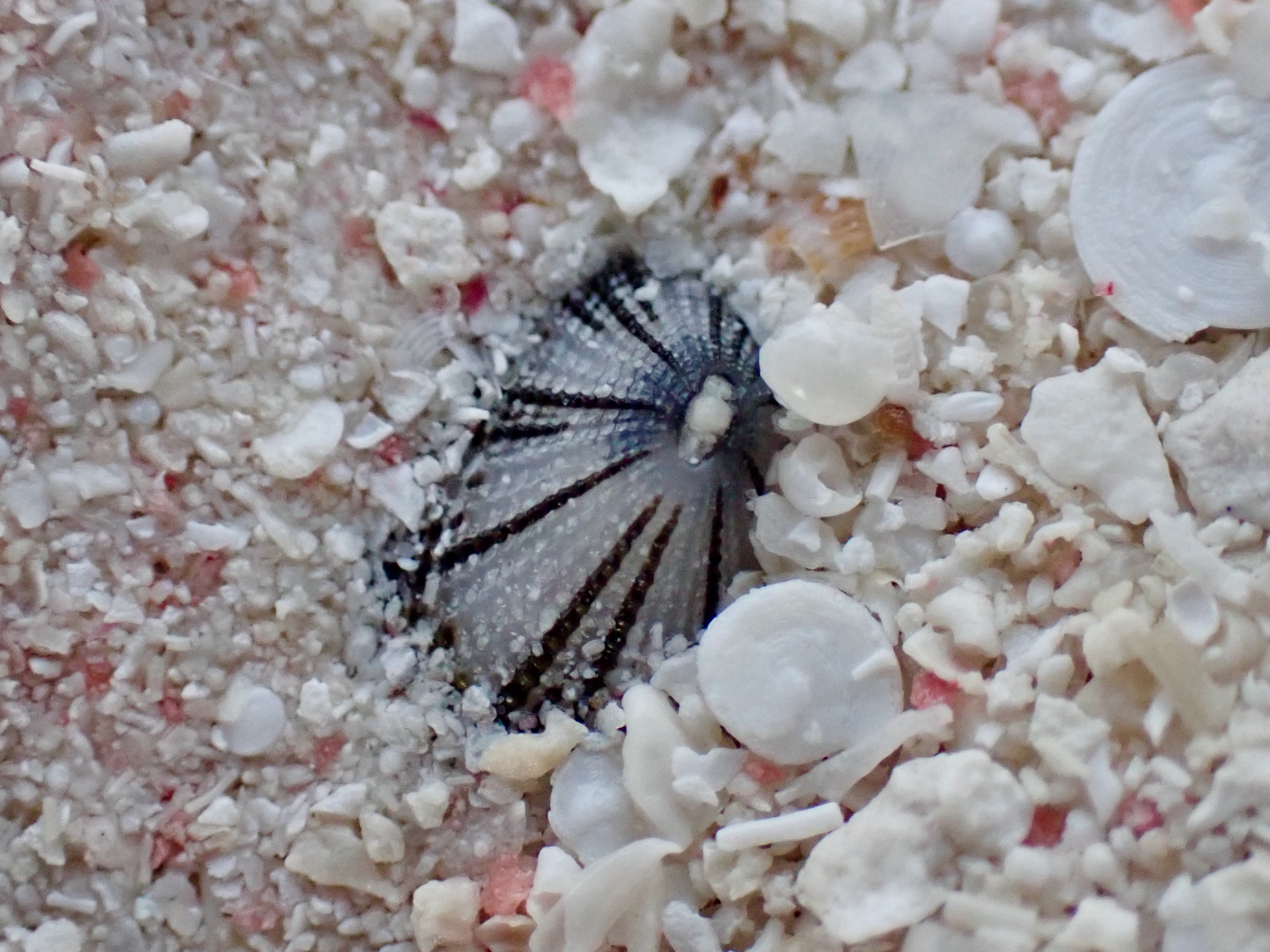
- Diodora minuta shell

Scientific classification
- Kingdom: Animalia
- Phylum: Mollusca
- Class: Gastropoda
- Subclass: Vetigastropoda
- Order: Lepetellida
- Family: Fissurellidae
- Genus: Diodora
- Species: D. minuta

Binomial name
- Diodora minuta (Lamarck, 1822)

= Diodora minuta =

Species of gastropod

Diodora minuta, known as the dwarf keyhole limpet or minute keyhole limpet, is a species of sea snail, a marine gastropod mollusk in the family Fissurellidae, the keyhole limpets. Found in southeast Florida and the West Indies, they can grow up to 0.5 inches (13 mm).
