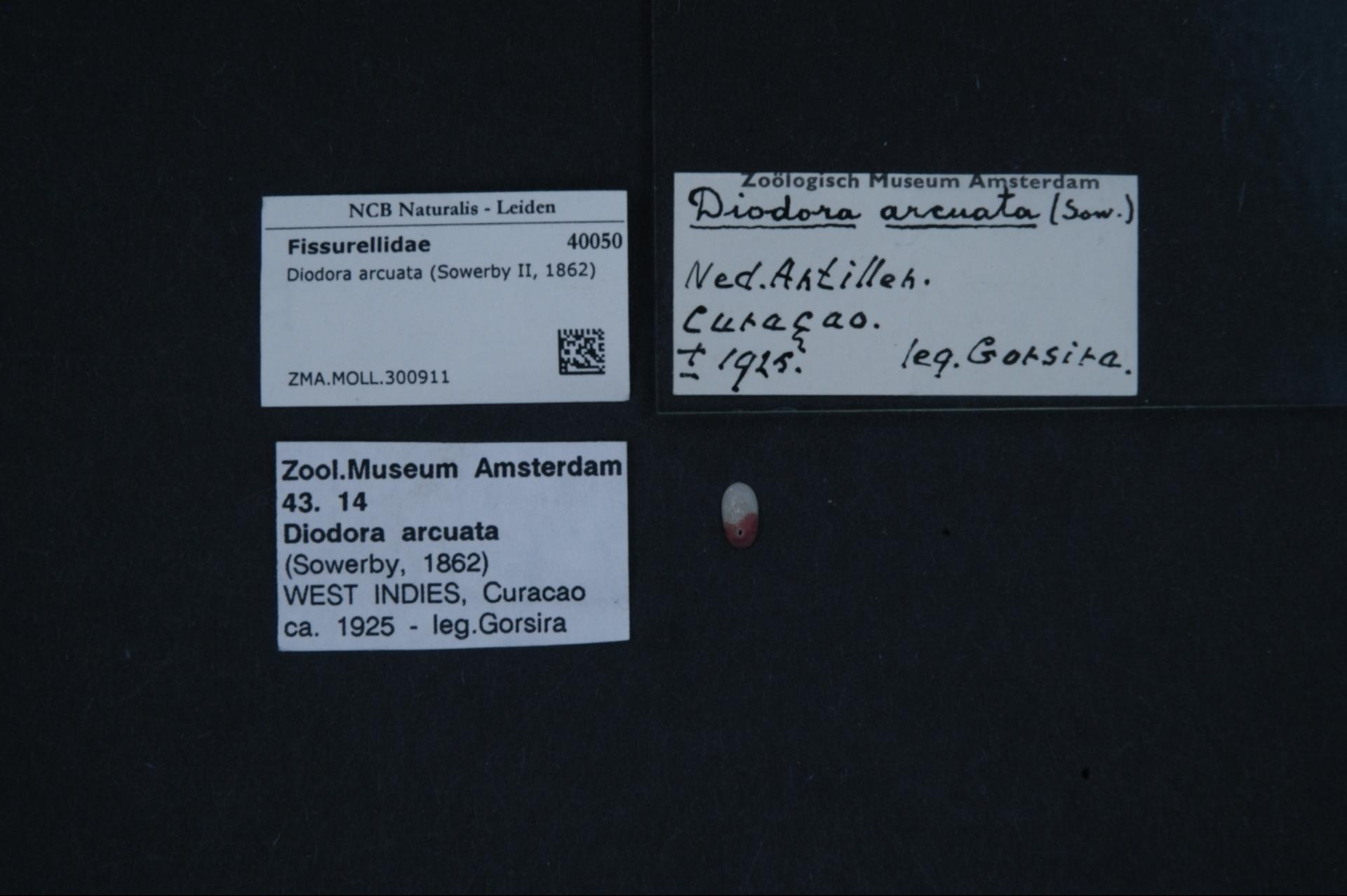
- Diodora Arcuata (Sowerby, 1862)

Scientific classification
- Kingdom: Animalia
- Phylum: Mollusca
- Class: Gastropoda
- Subclass: Vetigastropoda
- Order: Lepetellida
- Family: Fissurellidae
- Genus: Diodora
- Species: D. arcuata

Binomial name
- Diodora arcuata (Sowerby II, 1862)

Synonyms
- Glyphis arcuata (Sowerby II, 1862); Fissurella arcuata Sowerby II, 1862 (original combination)

= Diodora arcuata =

Species of gastropod

Diodora arcuata, common name the arcuate limpet, is a species of sea snail, a marine gastropod mollusk in the family Fissurellidae, the keyhole limpets.

== Description ==
The length of the shell varies between 8 mm and 15 mm.

Water is pulled in under the edge of the shell and is used for respiration and excretion. At or near the apex of the shell is a "keyhole" through which the water exits.

== Distribution ==
Diodora arcuata is found in the western Atlantic Ocean (off the Bahamas and Florida)., in the Gulf of Mexico, the Caribbean Sea, and the Lesser Antilles.
