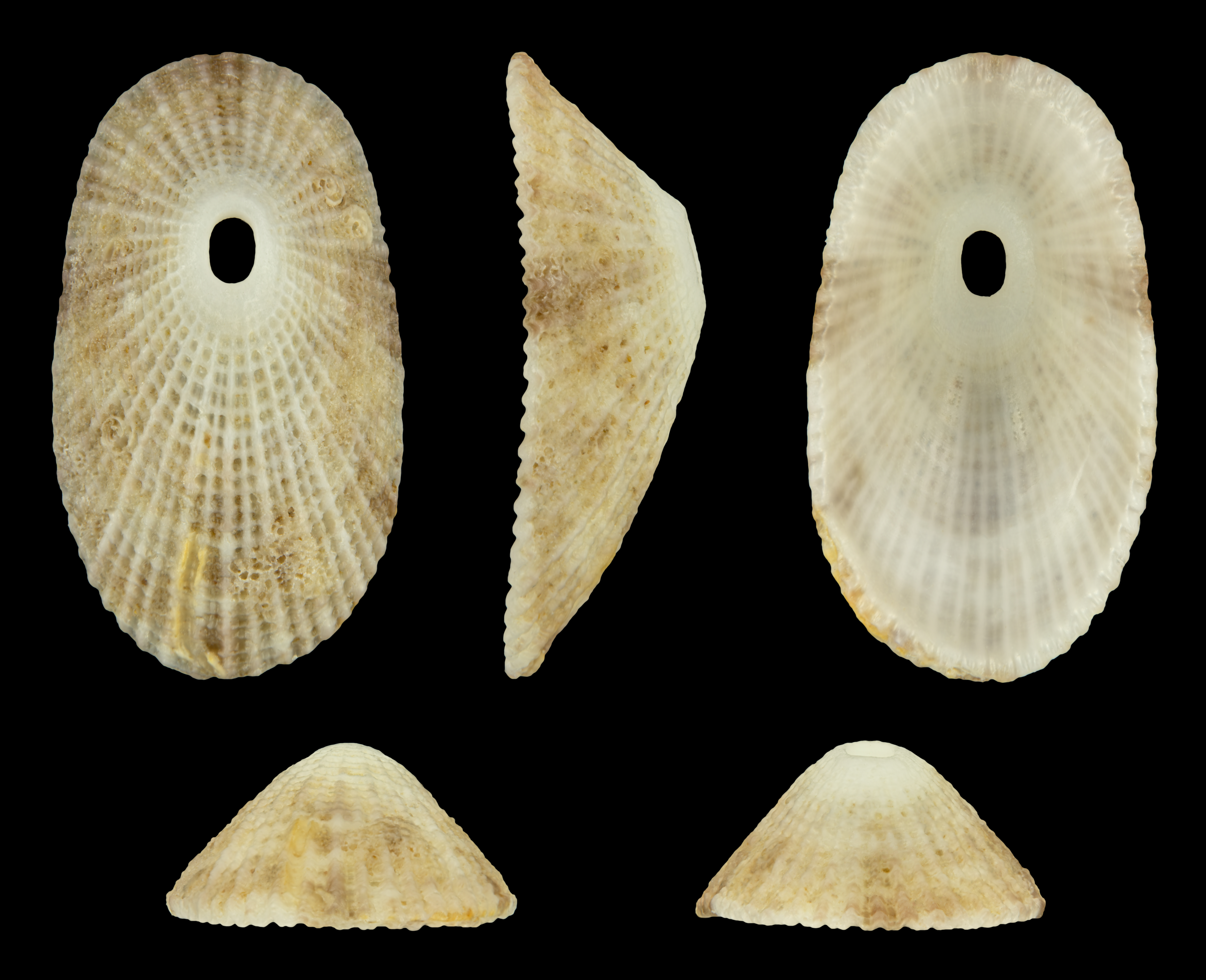

Scientific classification
- Kingdom: Animalia
- Phylum: Mollusca
- Class: Gastropoda
- Subclass: Vetigastropoda
- Order: Lepetellida
- Family: Fissurellidae
- Genus: Diodora
- Species: D. crucifera

Binomial name
- Diodora crucifera (Pilsbry, 1890)

Synonyms
- Fissurella cruciata Krauss, C.F., 1848 (renamed)

= Diodora crucifera =

Species of gastropod

Diodora crucifera is a species of sea snail, a marine gastropod mollusk in the family Fissurellidae, the keyhole limpets. First described in the late 1800s, it has a hole in the middle like other keyhole limpet shells. Examples of the species are hard to find.

== Description ==
The length of the shell varies between 10 mm and 20 mm.

== Distribution ==
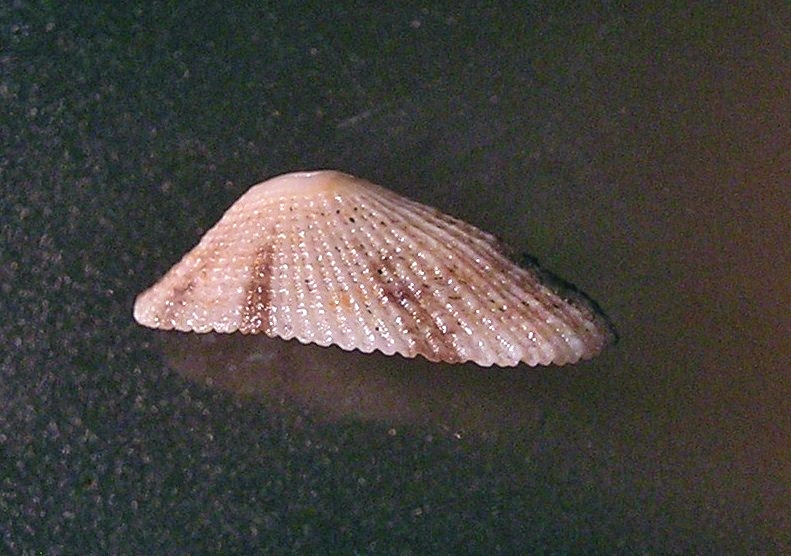
Side view of D. crucifera.

This marine species occurs in the Indian Ocean off Port Alfred, South Africa to Mozambique and in the Mascarene Basin.
