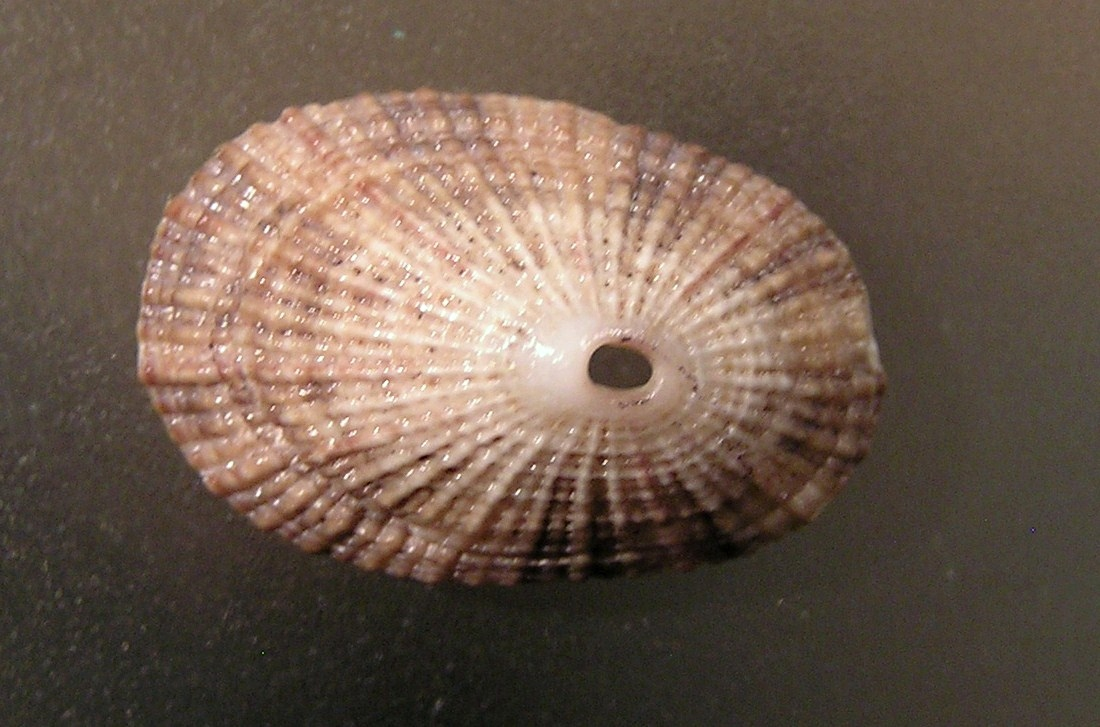
- Dorsal view of a shell of Diodora lineata

Scientific classification
- Kingdom: Animalia
- Phylum: Mollusca
- Class: Gastropoda
- Subclass: Vetigastropoda
- Order: Lepetellida
- Family: Fissurellidae
- Subfamily: Fissurellinae
- Genus: Diodora
- Species: D. lineata

Binomial name
- Diodora lineata (G.B. Sowerby I, 1835)

Synonyms
- Diodora rugosa Thiele, 1930; Elegidion audax Iredale, 1924; Fissurella incii Reeve, 1850; Fissurella lineata G.B. Sowerby I, 1835

= Diodora lineata =

Species of gastropod

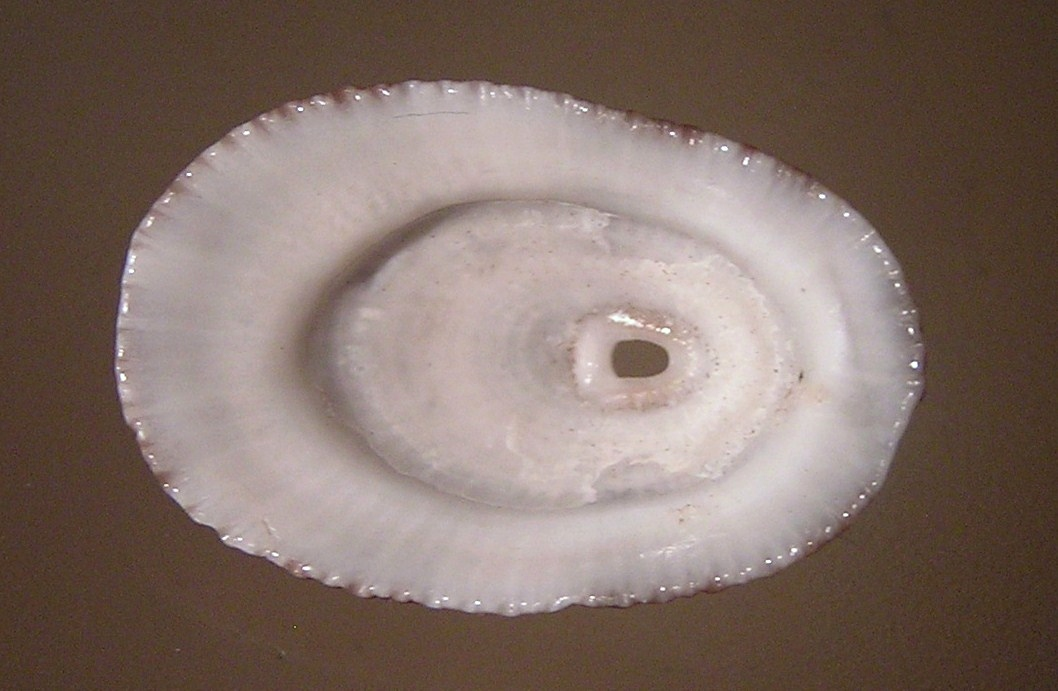
Ventral view of a shell of Diodora lineata

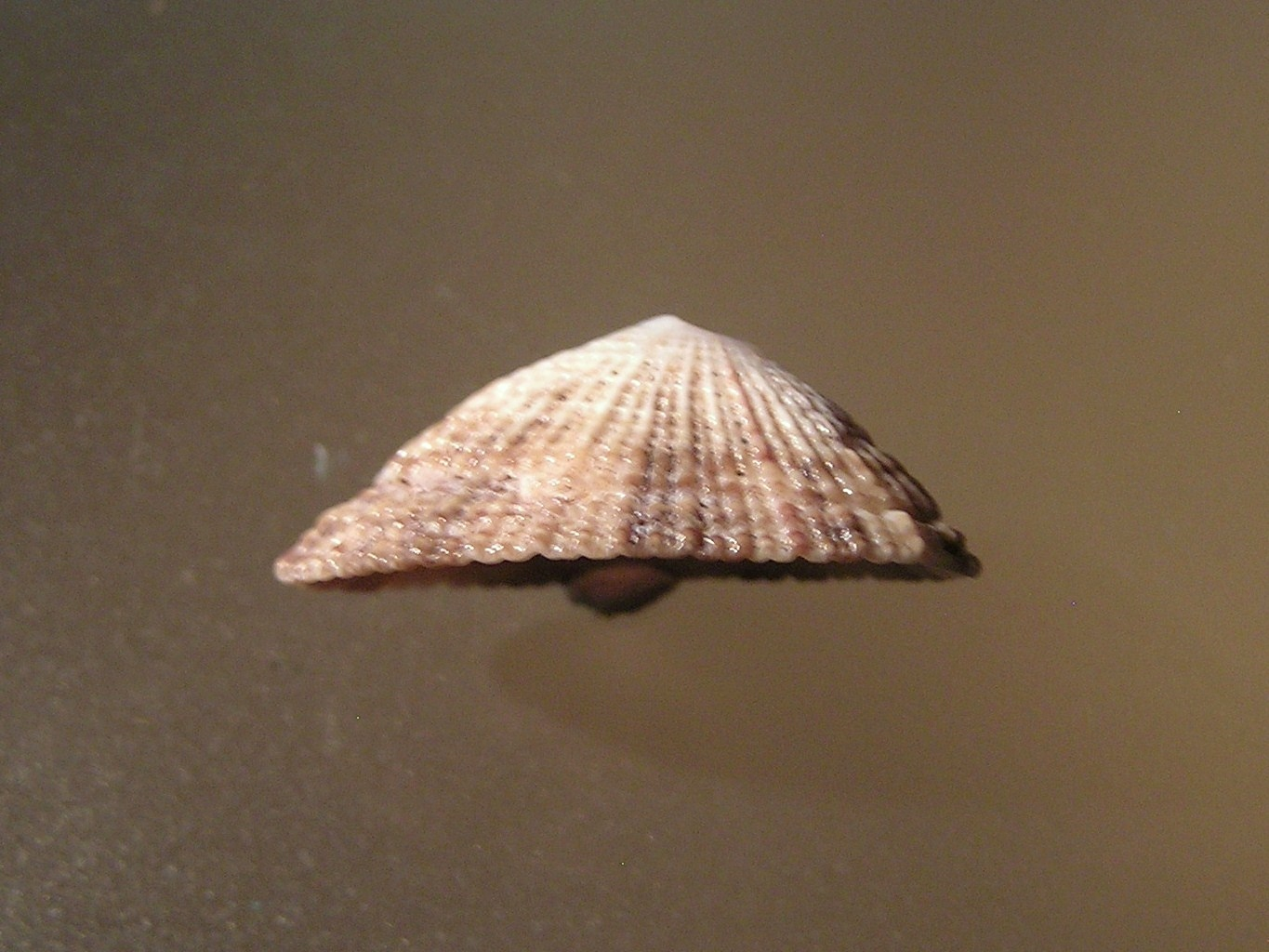
Lateral view of a shell of Diodora lineata

Diodora lineata is a species of sea snail, a marine gastropod mollusk in the family Fissurellidae, the keyhole limpets and slit limpets.
