= Diodora pusilla =

Scientific classification
- Kingdom: Animalia
- Phylum: Mollusca
- Class: Gastropoda
- Subclass: Vetigastropoda
- Order: Lepetellida
- Family: Fissurellidae
- Subfamily: Fissurellinae
- Genus: Diodora
- Species: D. pusilla

Binomial name
- Diodora pusilla Berry, 1959

Species of gastropod

Diodora pusilla is a species of sea snail, a marine gastropod mollusk in the family Fissurellidae, the keyhole limpets and slit limpets.
