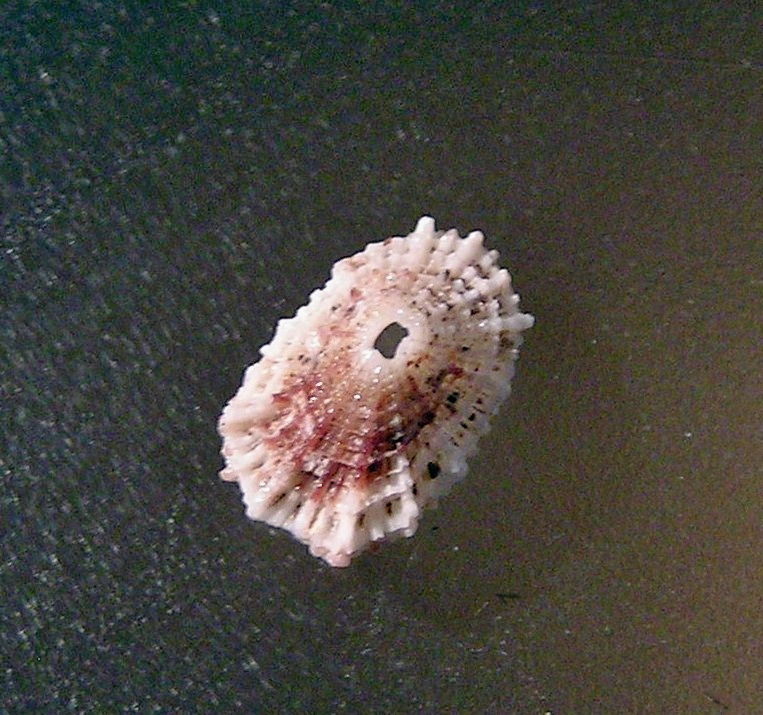
- Dorsal view of a shell of Diodora lincolnensis

Scientific classification
- Kingdom: Animalia
- Phylum: Mollusca
- Class: Gastropoda
- Subclass: Vetigastropoda
- Order: Lepetellida
- Family: Fissurellidae
- Subfamily: Fissurellinae
- Genus: Diodora
- Species: D. lincolnensis

Binomial name
- Diodora lincolnensis Cotton, 1930

= Diodora lincolnensis =

Species of gastropod

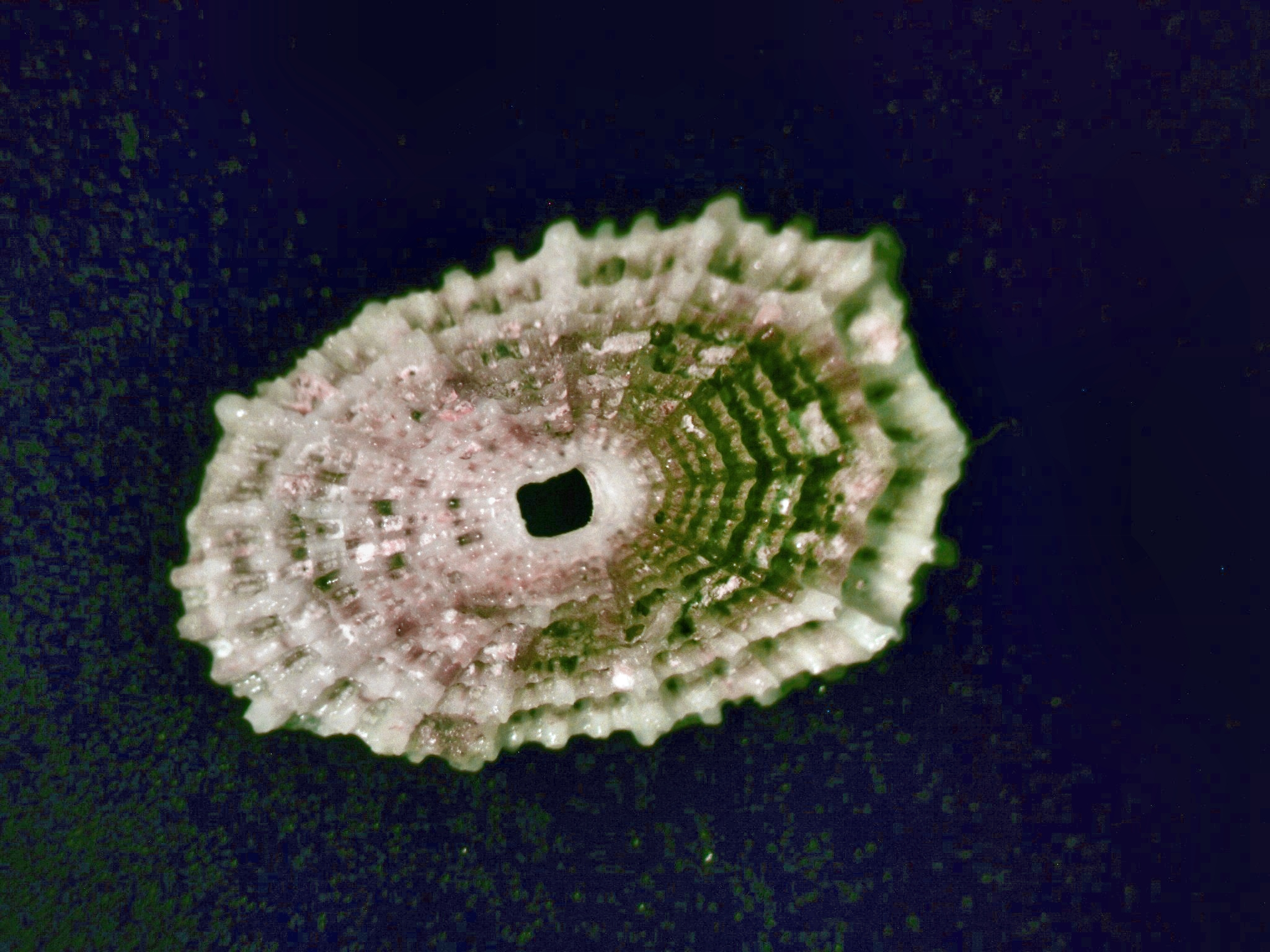
Ventral view of a shell of Diodora lincolnensis

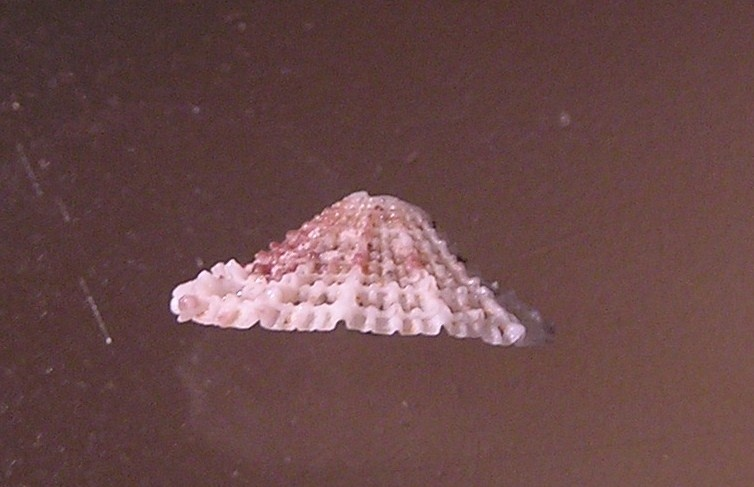
Lateral view of a shell of Diodora lincolnensis

Diodora lincolnensis is a species of sea snail, a marine gastropod mollusk in the family Fissurellidae, the keyhole limpets and slit limpets.
