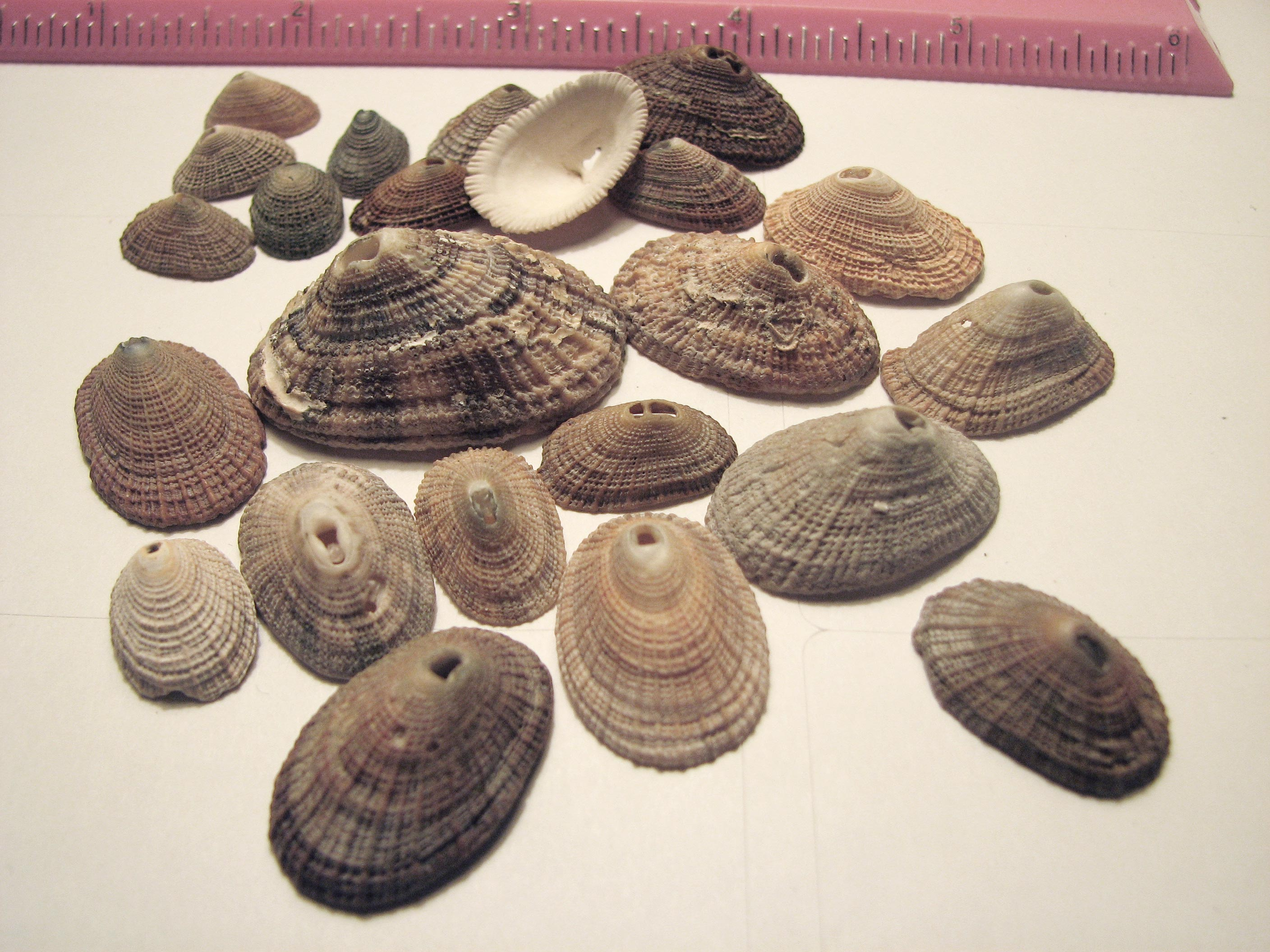
- Shells of Diodora cayenensis

Scientific classification
- Kingdom: Animalia
- Phylum: Mollusca
- Class: Gastropoda
- Subclass: Vetigastropoda
- Order: Lepetellida
- Family: Fissurellidae
- Subfamily: Fissurellinae
- Genus: Diodora; Gray, 1821

Type species
- Diodora graeca apertura (f) Montagu, G., 1803

Species
- See text

Synonyms
- Austroglyphis Cotton & Godfrey, 1934; Capiluna Gray, 1857; Diodora (Diodora) Gray, 1821; Elegidion Iredale, 1924; Fissuridea Swainson, 1840; Glyphis Carpenter, 1857 (invalid: junior homonym of Glyphis Agassiz, 1843); Monodilepas Finlay, H.J. 1926

= Diodora =

Genus of gastropods

Diodora is a genus of small to medium-sized keyhole limpet in the family Fissurellidae.

== Life habits ==
Like all other fissurellids, Diodora species are herbivores, and use the radula to scrape algae from rocks. An exception is D. apertura, which grazes on sponges such as Hymeniacidon.

Water for respiration and excretion is drawn in under the edge of the shell and exits through the "keyhole" at or near the apex.

== Species ==
Species in this genus include:

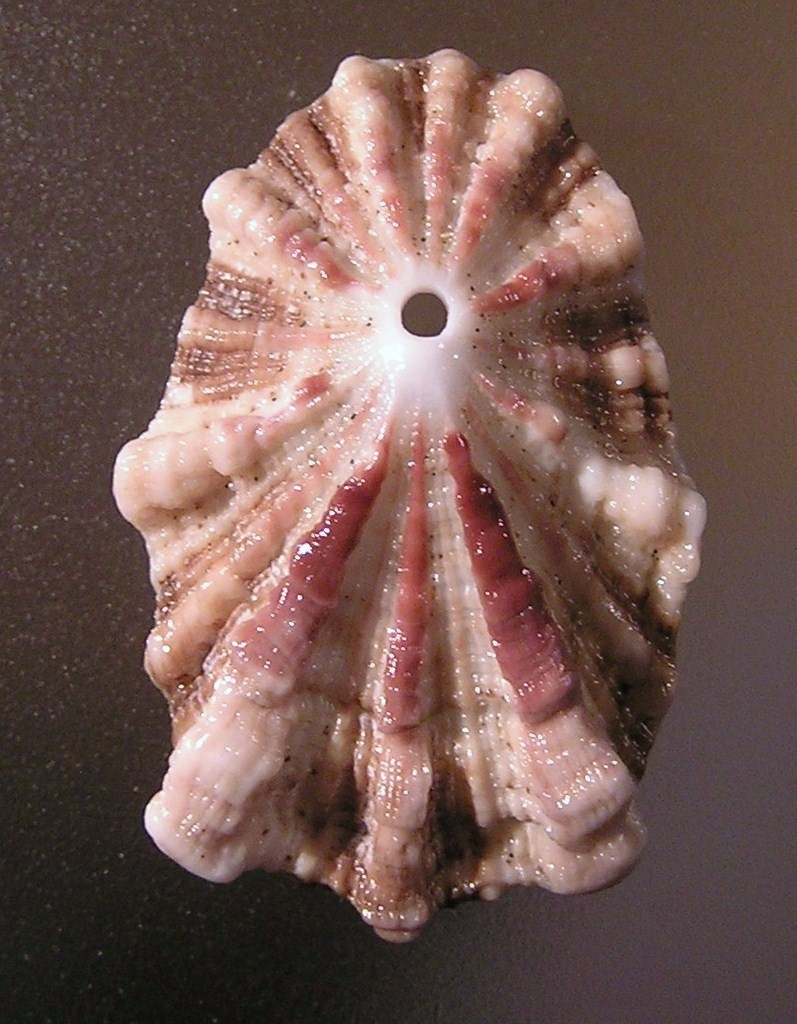
Diodora elizabethae

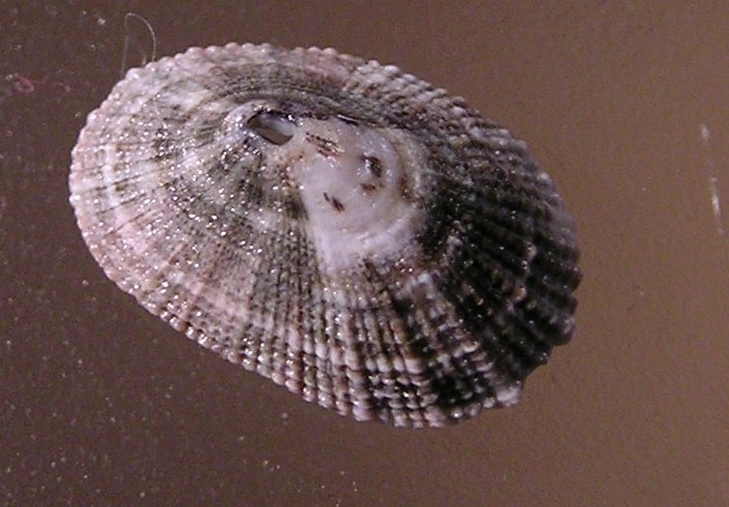
Diodora saturnalis

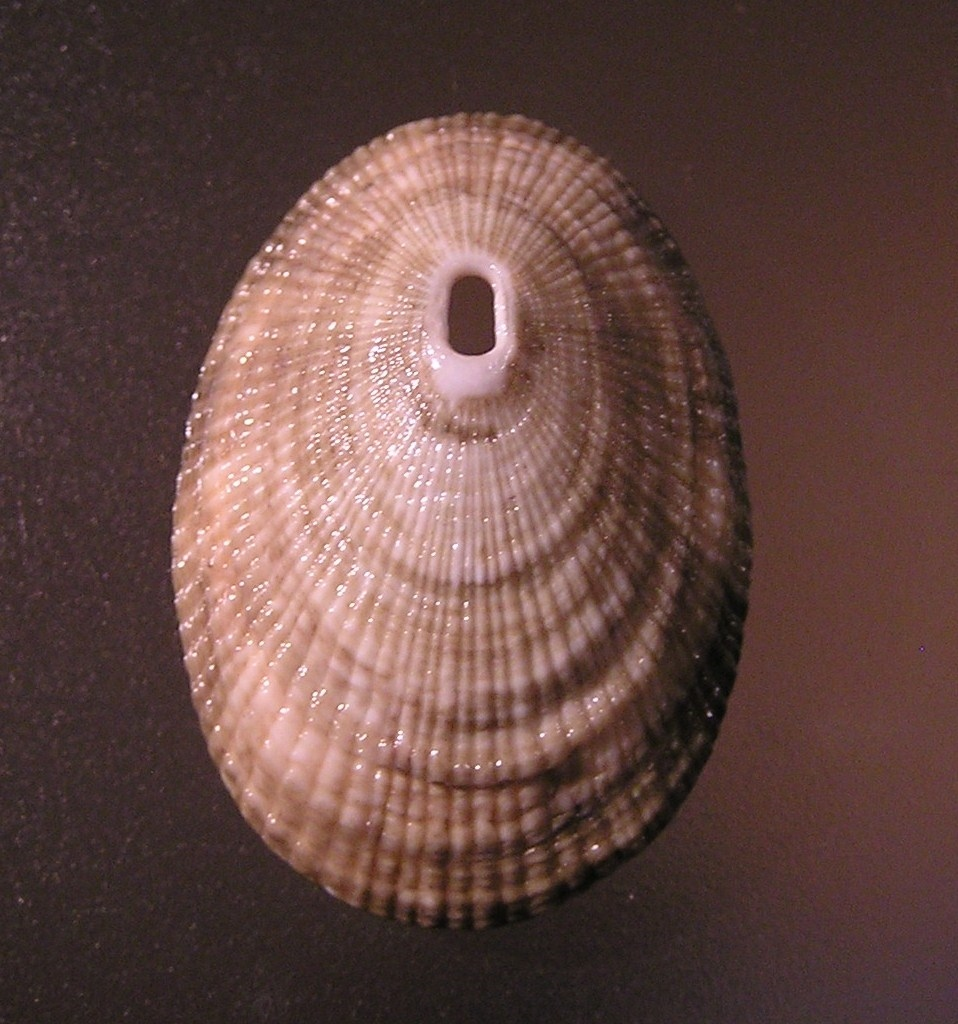
Diodora patagonica

- Diodora aguayoi Pérez Farfante, 1943
- Diodora alta (Adams, 1852)
- Diodora arcuata (Sowerby II, 1862)
- Diodora arnoldi McLean, 1966
- Diodora aspera (Rathke, 1833)
- Diodora australis (Krauss, 1848)
- Diodora benguelensis (Dunker, 1846)
- Diodora bermudensis (Dall & Bartsch, 1911)
- Diodora bollonsi (Oliver, 1915)
- Diodora calyculata (Sowerby I, 1823)
- Diodora canariensis Verstraeten & Naef, 2007
- Diodora candida (Sowerby I, 1835)
- Diodora cayenensis (Lamarck, 1822)
- Diodora corbicula (Sowerby II, 1862)
- Diodora cruciata (Gould, 1846)
- Diodora crucifera Pilsbry, 1890
- Diodora delicata (Smith, 1899)
- Diodora demartiniorum Buzzurro & Russo, 2004
- Diodora digueti (Mabille, 1895)
- Diodora dorsata (Monterosato, 1878)
- Diodora dysoni (Reeve, 1850)
- Diodora elevata (Dunker, 1846)
- Diodora elizabethae (Smith, 1901)
- Diodora fargoi Olsson & McGinty, 1958
- Diodora fluviana (Dall, 1889)
- Diodora fontainiana (d'Orbigny, 1841)
- Diodora fragilis Pérez Farfante & Henríquez, 1947
- Diodora funiculata (Reeve, 1850)
- Diodora fuscocrenulata (Smith, 1906) érez Farfante
- Diodora galeata (Helbing, 1779)
- Diodora giannispadai Aissaoui, Puillandre & Bouchet, 2017
- Diodora gibberula (Lamarck, 1822)
- Diodora graeca (Linnaeus, 1758)
- Diodora granifera (Pease, 1861)
- Diodora harrassowitzi (Ihering, 1927)
- Diodora inaequalis (Sowerby, 1835)
- Diodora italica (DeFrance, 1820)
- Diodora jaumei Aguayo & Rehder, 1936
- Diodora jukesii (Reeve, 1850)
- Diodora levicostata (Smith, 1914)
- Diodora lima (Sowerby II, 1862)
- Diodora lincolnensis (Cotton, 1930)
- Diodora lineata (Sowerby I, 1835)
- Diodora listeri (d'Orbigny, 1847)
- Diodora lorenzi Cossignani, 2020
- Diodora magnifica Poppe & Tagaro, 2020
- Diodora menkeana (Dunker, 1846)
- Diodora meta (Ihering, 1927)
- Diodora minuta (Lamarck, 1822)
- Diodora mirifica Métivier, 1972
- Diodora namibiensis Poppe, Tagaro & Sarino, 2011
- Diodora occidua (Cotton, 1930)
- Diodora occultata Poppe & Tagaro, 2020
- Diodora octagona (Reeve, 1850)
- Diodora panamensis (Sowerby, 1835)
- Diodora parviforata (Sowerby III, 1889)
- Diodora patagonica (d'Orbigny, 1839)
- Diodora philippiana (Dunker, 1846)
- Diodora pica (Sowerby I, 1835)
- Diodora producta (Monterosato, 1880)
- Diodora punctifissa McLean, 1970
- Diodora pusilla Berry, 1959
- Diodora quadriradiata (Reeve, 1850)
- Diodora ruppellii (Sowerby I, 1835)
- † Diodora sancticlementensis Landau, Van Dingenen & Ceulemans, 2017
- Diodora sarasuae Espinosa, 1984
- Diodora saturnalis (Carpenter, 1864)
- Diodora sayi (Dall, 1889)
- Diodora sculptilis Rolán & Gori, 2011
- Diodora serae Espinosa & Ortea, 2011
- Diodora sieboldii (Reeve, 1850)
- Diodora singaporensis (Reeve, 1850)
- Diodora spreta (Smith, 1901)
- † Diodora stalennuyi Dell'Angelo, Sosso, O. Anistratenko & V. Anistratenko, 2017
- Diodora tanneri (Verrill, 1882)
- Diodora tenuiclathrata (Seguenza, 1863)
- Diodora terezae Neves, Castillo & Ramil, 2019
- Diodora ticaonica (Reeve, 1850)
- Diodora variegata (Sowerby II, 1862)
- Diodora vetula (Woodring, 1928)
- Diodora viridula (Lamarck, 1822)
- Diodora wetmorei Pérez Farfante, 1945

Synonyms:

- Diodora fimbriata Reeve, 1850 : synonym of Diodora jukesii (Reeve, 1850)
- Diodora natalensis ((Krauss, 1848), 1848): synonym of Fissurella natalensis Krauss, 1848
- Diodora nigropunctata Thiele, 1930: synonym of Diodora jukesii (Reeve, 1850)
- Diodora noachina (Linnaeus, 1771): synonym of Puncturella noachina (Linnaeus, 1771)
- Diodora octogona [sic]: synonym of Diodora octagona (Reeve, 1850)
- Diodora ovalis Thiele, 1930: synonym of Diodora singaporensis (Reeve, 1850)
- Diodora philippiana (Finlay, 1930): synonym of Lucapina philippiana (Finlay, 1930)
- Diodora plicifera Thiele, 1930: synonym of Diodora jukesii (Reeve, 1850)
- Diodora reevei Schepman, 1908: synonym of Diodora octagona (Reeve, 1850)
- Diodora ruppellii (G.B. Sowerby I, 1835): synonym of Diodora rueppellii (G.B. Sowerby I, 1835)
- Diodora rugosa Thiele, 1930: synonym of Diodora lineata (G.B. Sowerby I, 1835)

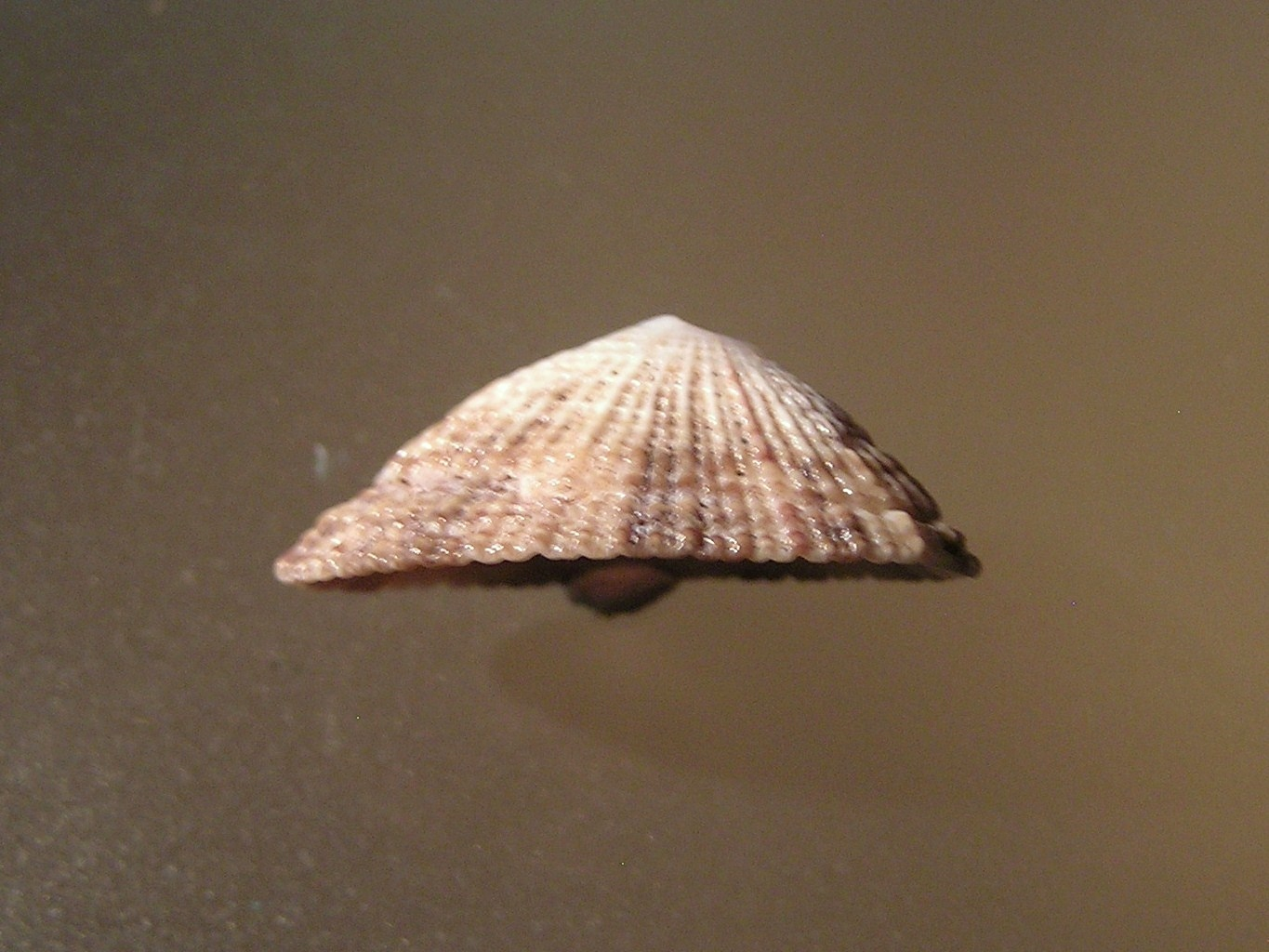
Diodora lineata

Further species include

- Diodora alternata Say, 1822
- Diodora beebei (Hertlein and Strong, 1951)
- Diodora bombayana Sowerby, 1862
- Diodora carditella Dall
- Diodora crenifera (Sowerby, 1835)
- Diodora densiclathrata McLean, 1966
- Diodora elaborata Sowerby
- Diodora fusilla S. S. Berry, 1959 (or Diodora pusilla Berry, 1959 ?)
- Diodora habanensis Christiaens, 1975
- Diodora murina Arnold, 1903
- Diodora mus (Reeve, 1850)
- Diodora nucula (Dall)
- Diodora semilunata (Habe, 1953)
- Diodora suprapunicea (Otuka, 1937)
- Diodora tenebrosa Conrad
- Diodora vola Reeve
