= Diodora jaumei =

Scientific classification
- Kingdom: Animalia
- Phylum: Mollusca
- Class: Gastropoda
- Subclass: Vetigastropoda
- Order: Lepetellida
- Family: Fissurellidae
- Genus: Diodora
- Species: D. jaumei

Binomial name
- Diodora jaumei Aguayo & Rehder, 1936

Species of gastropod

Diodora jaumei is a species of sea snail, a marine gastropod mollusk in the family Fissurellidae, the keyhole limpets.
