= Diodora vetula =

Scientific classification
- Kingdom: Animalia
- Phylum: Mollusca
- Class: Gastropoda
- Subclass: Vetigastropoda
- Order: Lepetellida
- Family: Fissurellidae
- Subfamily: Fissurellinae
- Genus: Diodora
- Species: D. vetula

Binomial name
- Diodora vetula (Woodring, 1928)

Species of gastropod

Diodora vetula is a species of sea snail, a marine gastropod mollusk in the family Fissurellidae, the keyhole limpets and slit limpets.
