= Diodora corbicula =

Scientific classification
- Kingdom: Animalia
- Phylum: Mollusca
- Class: Gastropoda
- Subclass: Vetigastropoda
- Order: Lepetellida
- Family: Fissurellidae
- Subfamily: Fissurellinae
- Genus: Diodora
- Species: D. corbicula

Binomial name
- Diodora corbicula (Sowerby, 1862)

Synonyms
- Fissurella corbicula Sowerby II, 1862 (original combination); Fissurella lanceolata Sowerby II, 1862

Species of gastropod

Diodora corbicula is a species of sea snail, a marine gastropod mollusk in the family Fissurellidae, the keyhole limpets and slit limpets.

== Description ==
The shell reaches a size of 30 mm.

== Distribution ==
This marine species occurs off Queensland, Australia.
