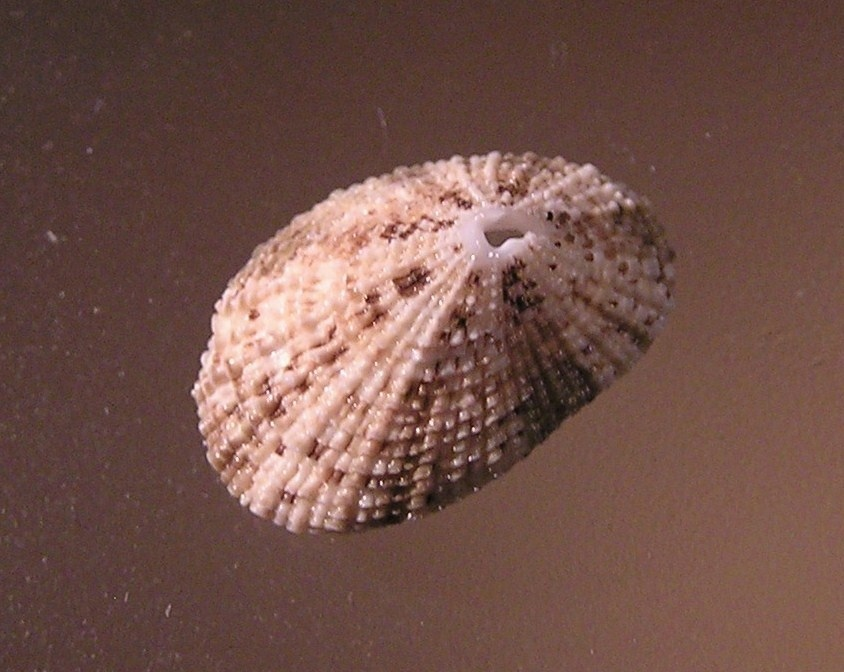
- A shell of Diodora dysoni

Scientific classification
- Kingdom: Animalia
- Phylum: Mollusca
- Class: Gastropoda
- Subclass: Vetigastropoda
- Order: Lepetellida
- Family: Fissurellidae
- Genus: Diodora
- Species: D. dysoni

Binomial name
- Diodora dysoni (Reeve, 1850)

= Diodora dysoni =

Species of gastropod

Diodora dysoni, common name Dyson's keyhole limpet, is a species of small sea snail or limpet, a marine gastropod mollusk in the family Fissurellidae, the keyhole limpets.

== Description ==
The size of the shell varies between 12 mm and 28 mm.

The attribute of Diodora dysoni include, a benthos functional type. Diodora dysoni is a predator that feeds on sessile prey, including Porifera.

== Distribution ==
This species occurs in the Gulf of Mexico, the Caribbean Sea and the Lesser Antilles; in the Atlantic Ocean from the Bahamas to Brazil.
