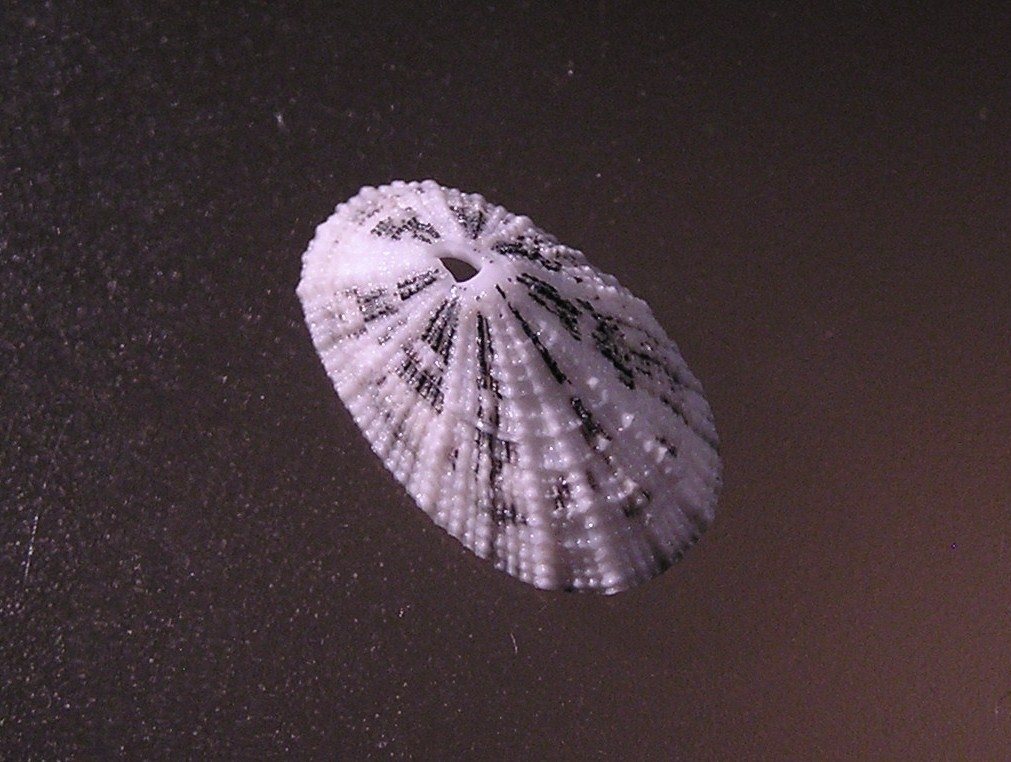
- Diodora aguayoi

Scientific classification
- Kingdom: Animalia
- Phylum: Mollusca
- Class: Gastropoda
- Subclass: Vetigastropoda
- Order: Lepetellida
- Family: Fissurellidae
- Genus: Diodora
- Species: D. aguayoi

Binomial name
- Diodora aguayoi Pérez Farfante, 1943

= Diodora aguayoi =

Species of gastropod

Diodora aguayoi is a species of sea snail, a marine gastropod mollusk in the family Fissurellidae, the keyhole limpets.

== Description ==
The size of the shell reaches 22 mm. This sea snail is a broadcast spawner, with embryos maturing into planktonic trocophore larvae, followed by maturing into juvenile veligers and finally becoming fully grown adults.

== Distribution ==
This species occurs in the Gulf of Mexico, the Caribbean Sea and off Bermuda and Barbados at depths of 50-823 m.
