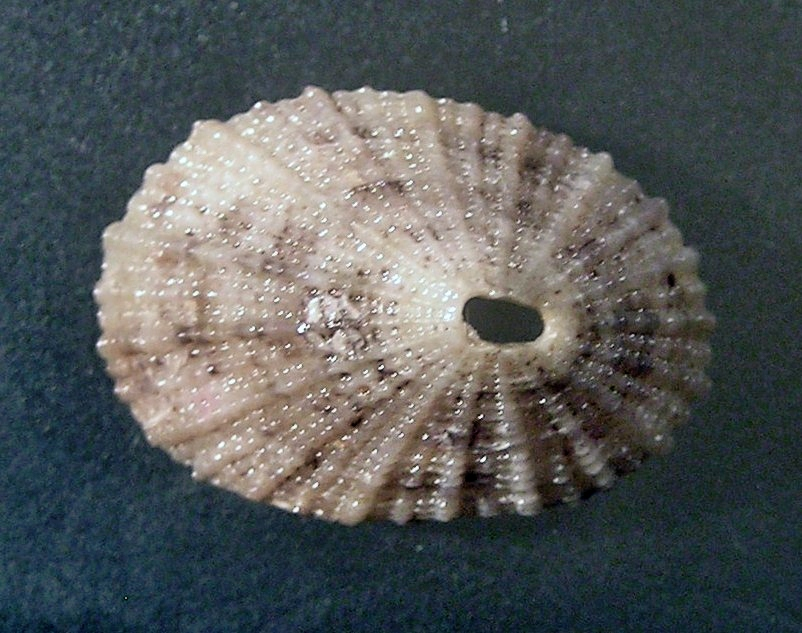

Scientific classification
- Kingdom: Animalia
- Phylum: Mollusca
- Class: Gastropoda
- Subclass: Vetigastropoda
- Order: Lepetellida
- Family: Fissurellidae
- Genus: Diodora
- Species: D. quadriradiata

Binomial name
- Diodora quadriradiata (Reeve, 1850)

Synonyms
- Fissurella quadriradiata Reeve, 1850

= Diodora quadriradiata =

Species of gastropod

Diodora quadriradiata is a species of sea snail, a marine gastropod mollusk in the family Fissurellidae, the keyhole limpets.

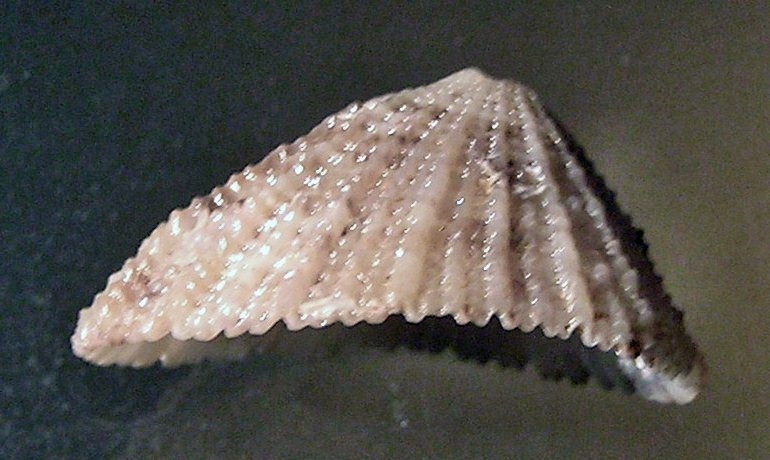
side view

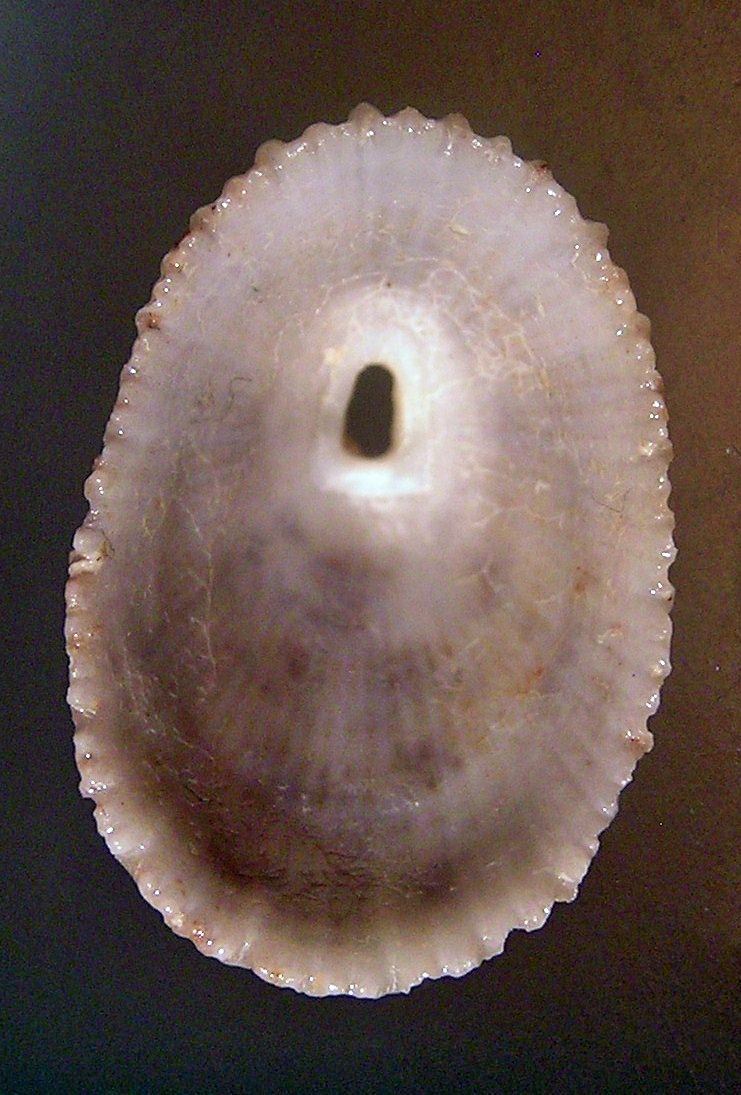
underside
