= Diodora canariensis =

Scientific classification
- Kingdom: Animalia
- Phylum: Mollusca
- Class: Gastropoda
- Subclass: Vetigastropoda
- Order: Lepetellida
- Family: Fissurellidae
- Genus: Diodora
- Species: D. canariensis

Binomial name
- Diodora canariensis Verstraeten & Nolf, 2007

Species of gastropod

Diodora canariensis is a species of sea snail, a marine gastropod mollusk in the family Fissurellidae, the keyhole limpets. It is endemic in the western Canary Islands in the eastern Atlantic Ocean.

== Description ==
The length of the shell attains about 8 mm. It has the cap-shaped form that is typical for keyhole limpets. The shell has an oval outline, featuring a small opening near the apex, and it shows radial ribbing along with growth lines.

== Distribution ==
This species occurs in the Atlantic Ocean off the Canary Islands.
