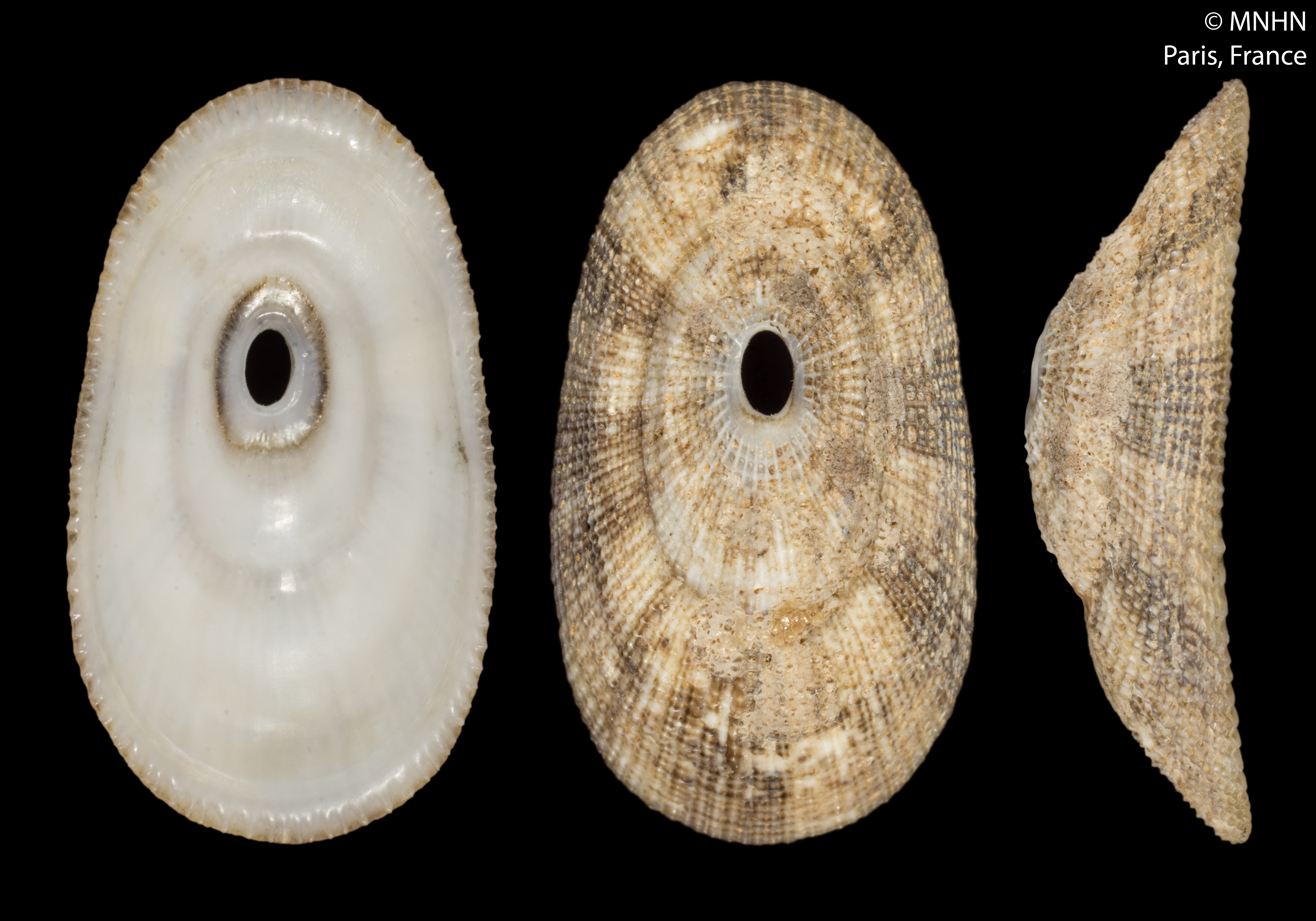

Scientific classification
- Kingdom: Animalia
- Phylum: Mollusca
- Class: Gastropoda
- Subclass: Vetigastropoda
- Order: Lepetellida
- Family: Fissurellidae
- Subfamily: Fissurellinae
- Genus: Diodora
- Species: D. digueti

Binomial name
- Diodora digueti (Mabille, 1895)

= Diodora digueti =

Species of gastropod

Diodora digueti is a species of sea snail, a marine gastropod mollusk in the family Fissurellidae, the keyhole limpets and slit limpets.

== Description ==
The size of the shell reaches 25 mm.

== Distribution ==
This species occurs in the Pacific Ocean from Baja California, Mexico to Ecuador
