= Diodora fluviana =

Scientific classification
- Kingdom: Animalia
- Phylum: Mollusca
- Class: Gastropoda
- Subclass: Vetigastropoda
- Order: Lepetellida
- Family: Fissurellidae
- Genus: Diodora
- Species: D. fluviana

Binomial name
- Diodora fluviana (Dall, 1889)

Synonyms
- Fissurella (Glyphis) fluviana Dall, 1889 (original combination)

Species of gastropod

Diodora fluviana is a species of sea snail, a marine gastropod mollusk in the family Fissurellidae, the keyhole limpets.

== Description ==
The size of the shell reaches 12 mm.

== Distribution ==
This species occurs in the Gulf of Mexico, the Caribbean Sea and the Lesser Antilles; in the Atlantic Ocean from Southeast USA to Brazil.
