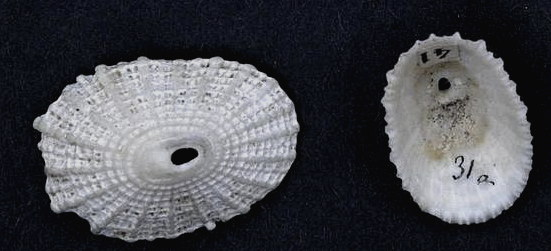
- Top view and basal view of a shell of Diodora jukesii (museum specimens at Naturalis Biodiversity Center)

Scientific classification
- Kingdom: Animalia
- Phylum: Mollusca
- Class: Gastropoda
- Subclass: Vetigastropoda
- Order: Lepetellida
- Family: Fissurellidae
- Subfamily: Fissurellinae
- Genus: Diodora
- Species: D. jukesii

Binomial name
- Diodora jukesii (Reeve, 1850)

Synonyms
- Diodora fimbriata Reeve, 1850; Diodora nigropunctata Thiele, 1930; Diodora plicifera Thiele, 1930; Elegidion occiduus Cotton, B.C. 1930; Fissurella fimbriata Reeve, L.A. 1850; Fissurella jukesii Reeve, 1850 (original combination); Fissurella similis Sowerby, 1862

= Diodora jukesii =

Species of gastropod

Diodora jukesii, common name Jukes' keyhole limpet, is a species of sea snail, a marine gastropod mollusk in the family Fissurellidae, the keyhole limpets and slit limpets.

== Description ==
The size of the shell varies between 23 mm and 63 mm.

== Distribution ==
This marine species is endemic to Australia and occurs off the Northern Territory, Queensland and Western Australia.
