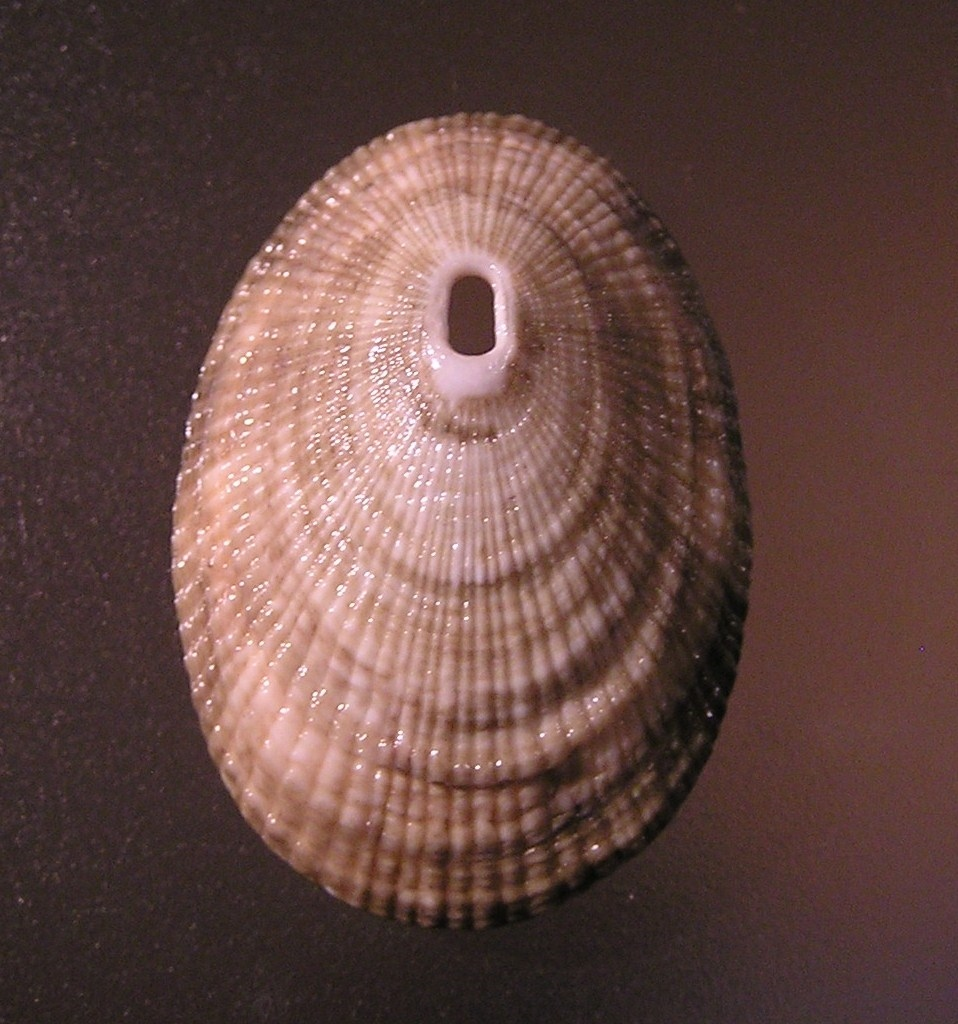
- Dorsal view of a shell of Diodora patagonica

Scientific classification
- Kingdom: Animalia
- Phylum: Mollusca
- Class: Gastropoda
- Subclass: Vetigastropoda
- Order: Lepetellida
- Family: Fissurellidae
- Subfamily: Fissurellinae
- Genus: Diodora
- Species: D. patagonica

Binomial name
- Diodora patagonica (d'Orbigny, 1839)

= Diodora patagonica =

Species of gastropod

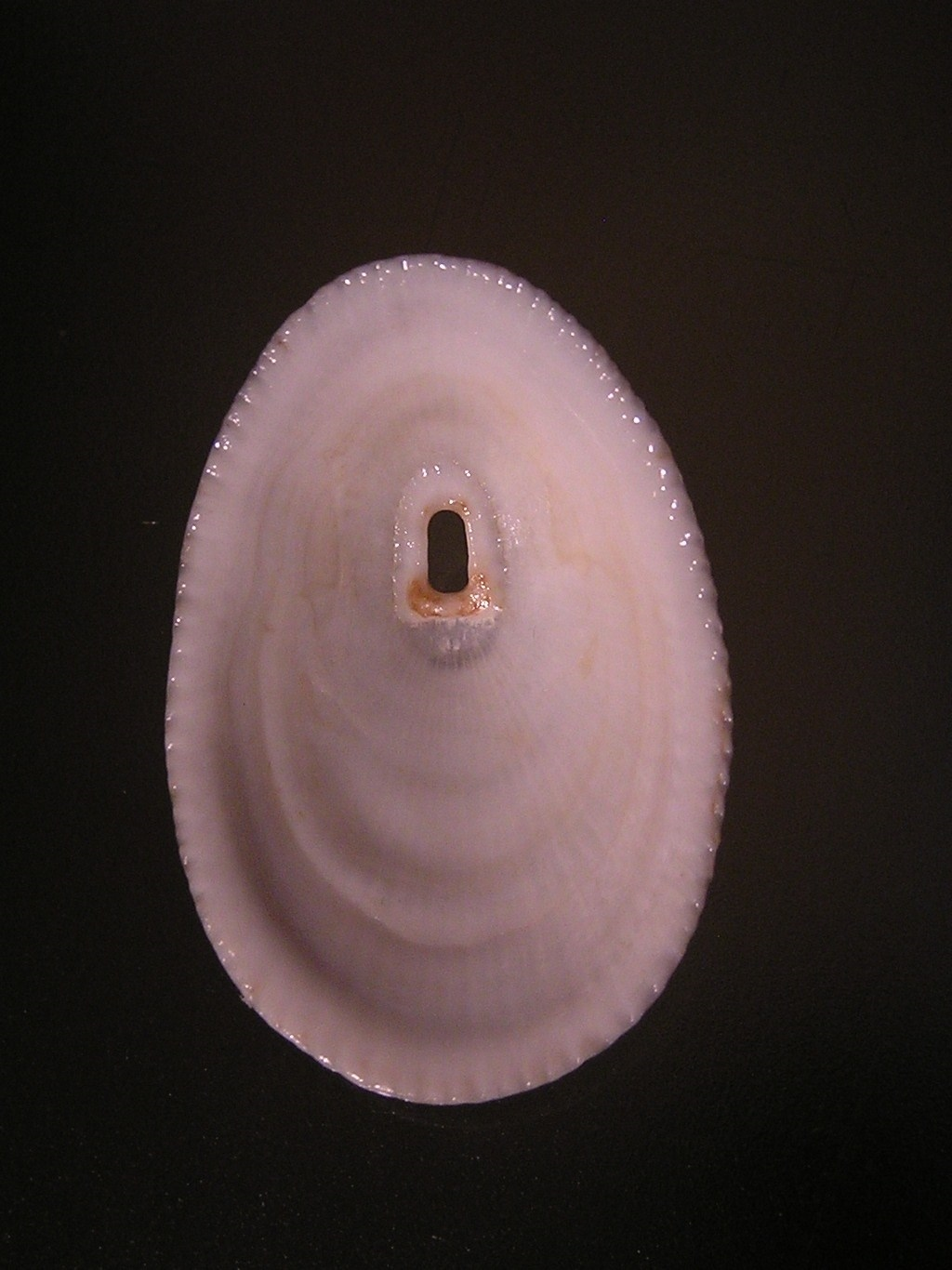
Ventral view of a shell of Diodora patagonica

Diodora patagonica is a species of sea snail, a marine gastropod mollusk in the family Fissurellidae, the keyhole limpets and slit limpets.
