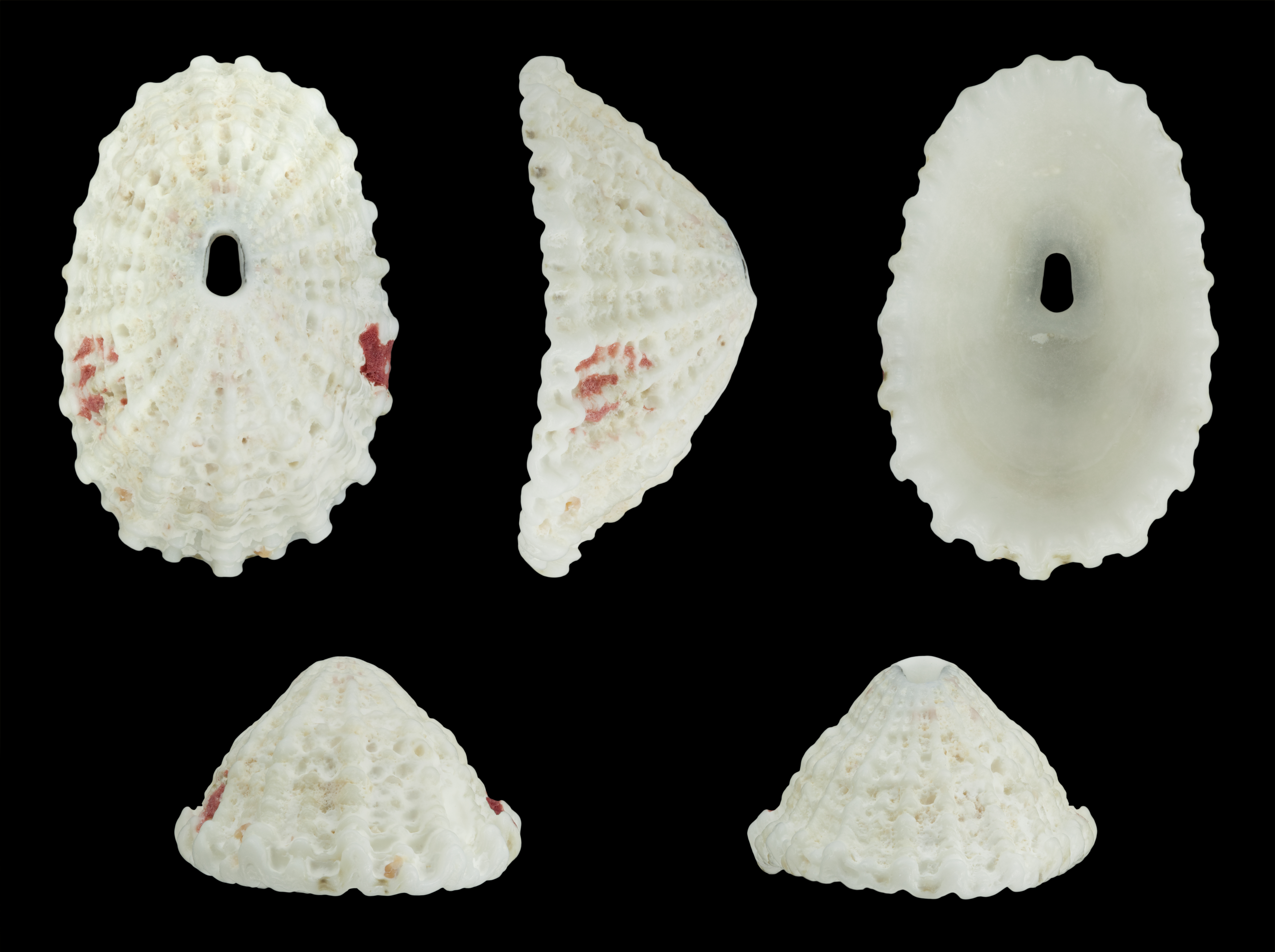

Scientific classification
- Kingdom: Animalia
- Phylum: Mollusca
- Class: Gastropoda
- Subclass: Vetigastropoda
- Order: Lepetellida
- Family: Fissurellidae
- Genus: Diodora
- Species: D. listeri

Binomial name
- Diodora listeri (d’Orbigny, 1847)

= Diodora listeri =

Species of gastropod

Diodora listeri is a species of sea snail, a marine gastropod mollusk in the family Fissurellidae, the keyhole limpets.

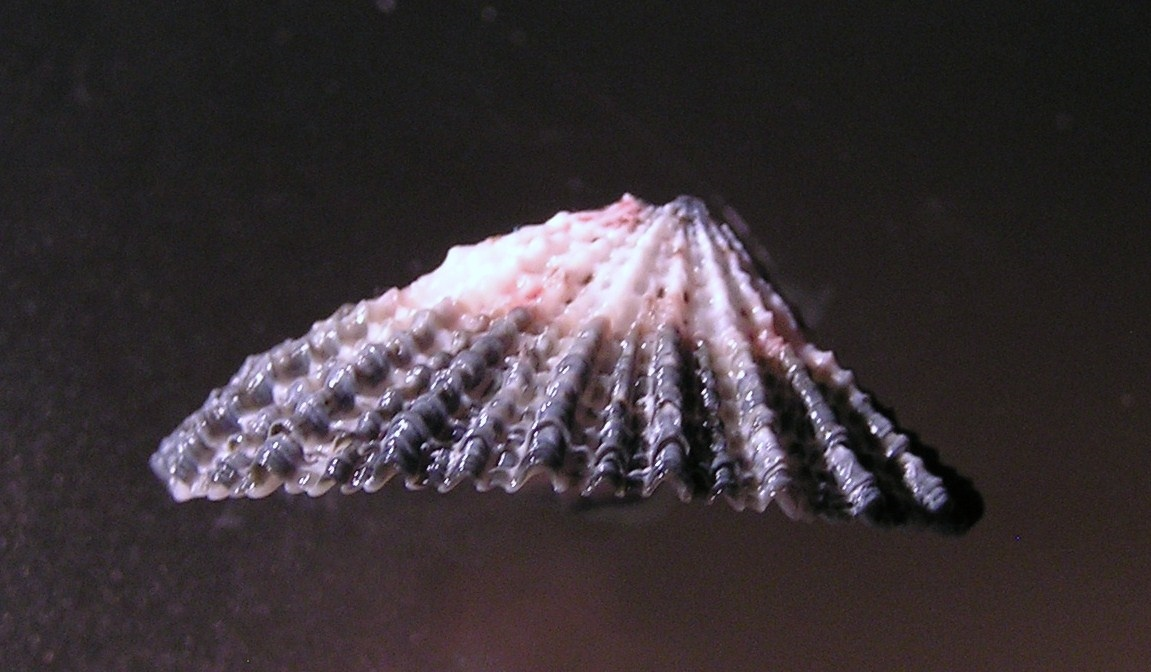
side view

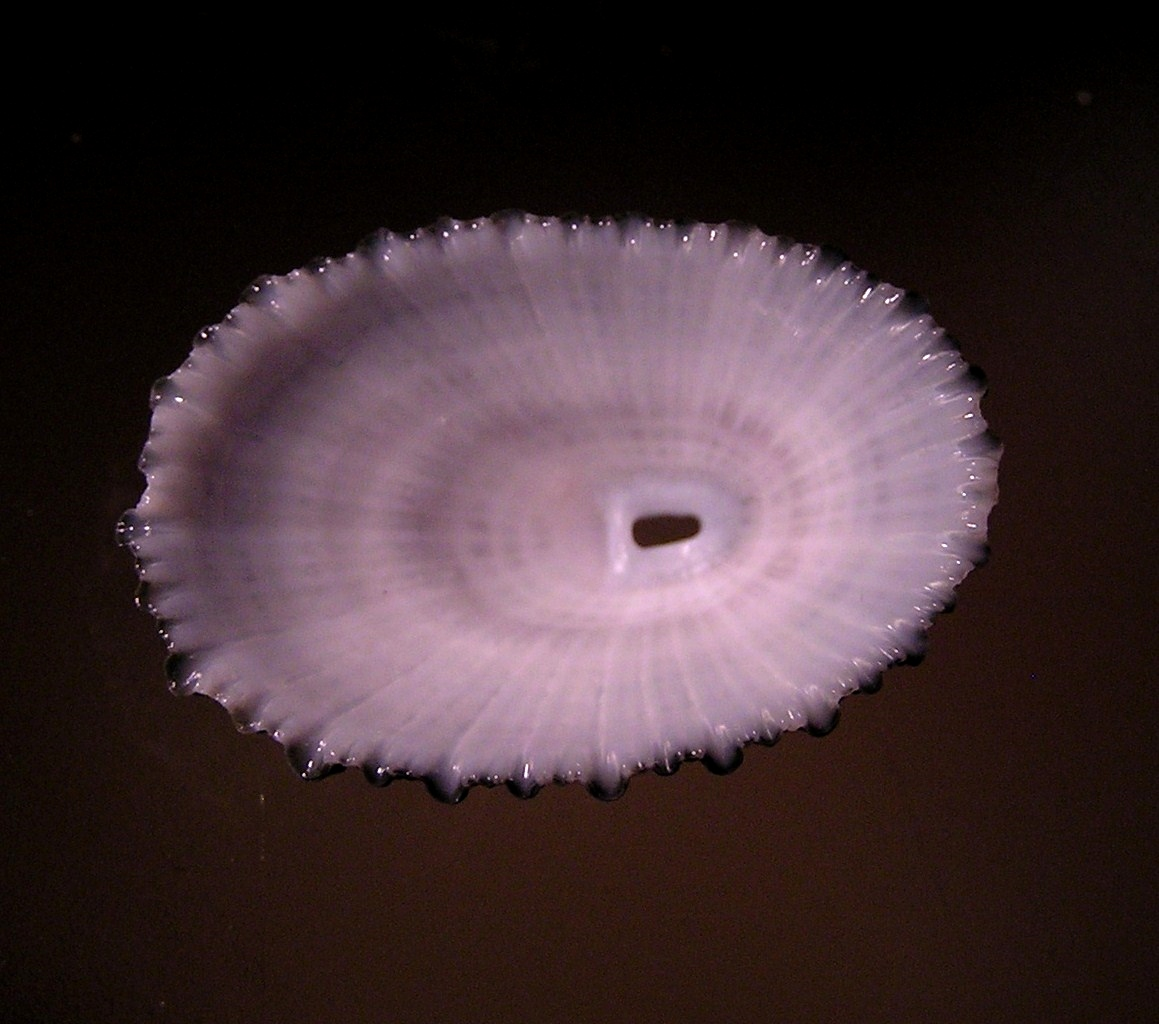
underside

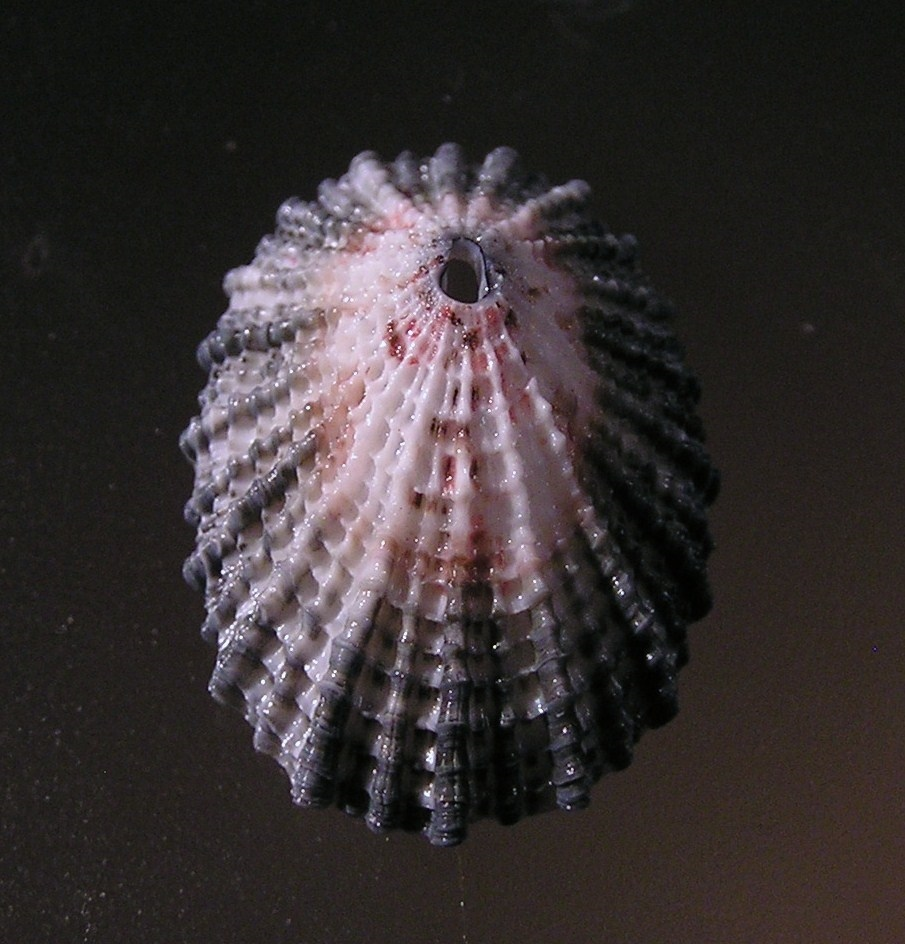
