= Diodora levicostata =

Scientific classification
- Kingdom: Animalia
- Phylum: Mollusca
- Class: Gastropoda
- Subclass: Vetigastropoda
- Order: Lepetellida
- Family: Fissurellidae
- Subfamily: Fissurellinae
- Genus: Diodora
- Species: D. levicostata

Binomial name
- Diodora levicostata (Smith, 1914)

Synonyms
- Diodora (Diodora) levicostata (Smith, 1914); Fissurella sculpturata Turton, 1932; Glyphis levicostata Smith, 1914

Species of gastropod

Diodora levicostata is a species of sea snail, a marine gastropod mollusk in the family Fissurellidae, the keyhole limpets and slit limpets.
