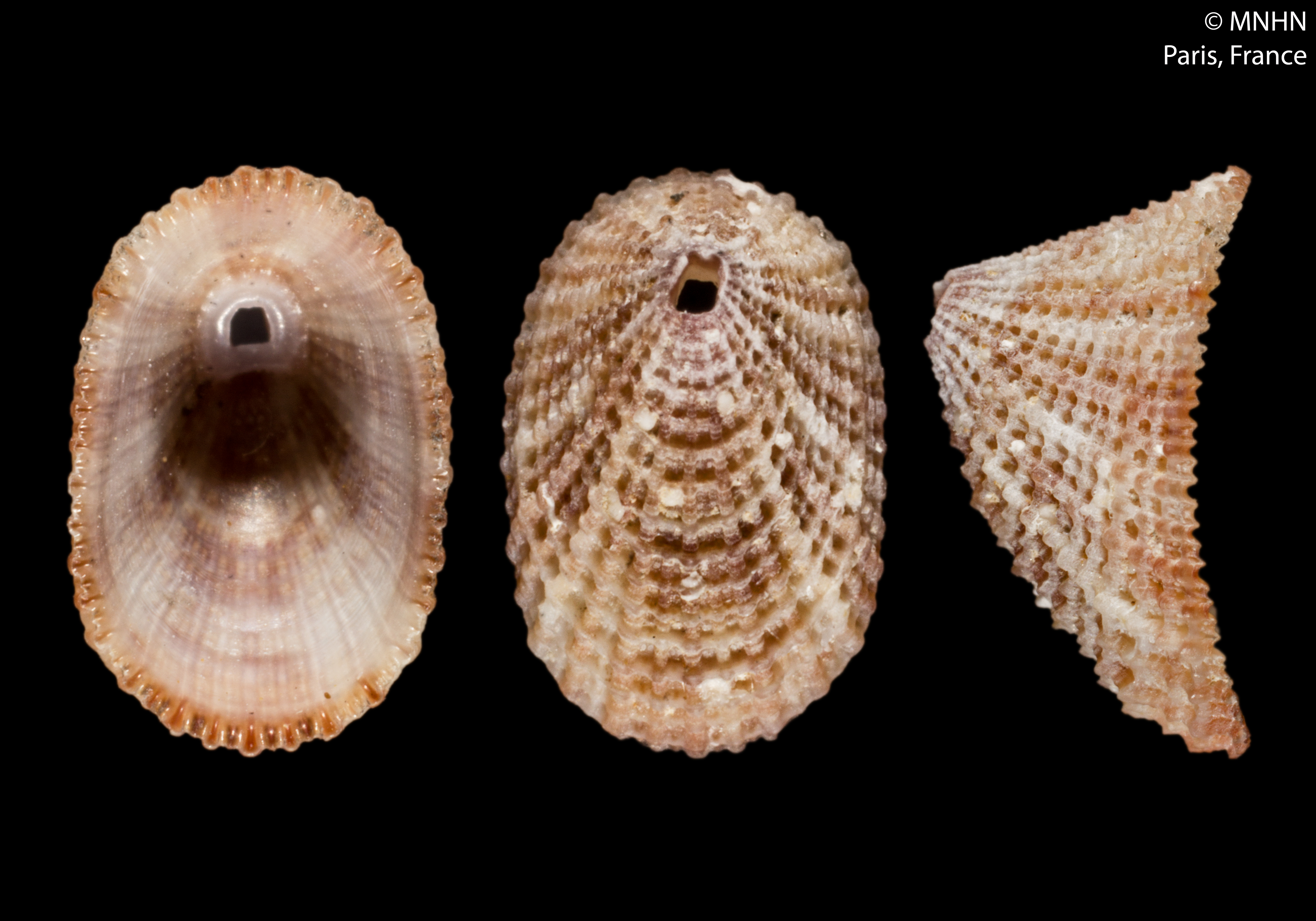
- Diodora sculptilis

Scientific classification
- Kingdom: Animalia
- Phylum: Mollusca
- Class: Gastropoda
- Subclass: Vetigastropoda
- Order: Lepetellida
- Family: Fissurellidae
- Subfamily: Fissurellinae
- Genus: Diodora
- Species: D. sculptilis

Binomial name
- Diodora sculptilis Rolán & Gori, 2011

= Diodora sculptilis =

Species of gastropod

Diodora sculptilis is a species of sea snail, a marine gastropod mollusk in the family Fissurellidae, the keyhole limpets and slit limpets.
