= Diodora fuscocrenulata =

Scientific classification
- Kingdom: Animalia
- Phylum: Mollusca
- Class: Gastropoda
- Subclass: Vetigastropoda
- Order: Lepetellida
- Family: Fissurellidae
- Subfamily: Fissurellinae
- Genus: Diodora
- Species: D. fuscocrenulata

Binomial name
- Diodora fuscocrenulata (Smith, 1906)

Species of gastropod

Diodora fuscocrenulata(was also called Glyphis fuscocrenulata) is a species of sea snail, a marine gastropod mollusk in the family Fissurellidae, the keyhole limpets and slit limpets.

== Description ==
The size of the shell varies between 8 mm and 20 mm.

The concentric lira form thickened scales upon the costae and when a little worn out, have a bead-like appearance. The foramen is roundly ovate, small, and thickened within, with a white collar. The interior of the shell has a thin deposit of white, glossy callus, through which the external costae are visible. The dotting upon the margin is formed by the terminations of the costae.

== Distribution ==
This species occurs in the Indian Ocean off KwaZuluNatal, South Africa.
