= Diodora candida =

Scientific classification
- Kingdom: Animalia
- Phylum: Mollusca
- Class: Gastropoda
- Subclass: Vetigastropoda
- Order: Lepetellida
- Family: Fissurellidae
- Genus: Diodora
- Species: D. candida

Binomial name
- Diodora candida (Sowerby I, 1835)

Species of gastropod

Diodora candida is a species of sea snail, a marine gastropod mollusk in the family Fissurellidae, the keyhole limpets.

== Description ==
The size of the shell reaches 11 mm.

== Distribution ==
This species occurs in the Atlantic Ocean off the Cape Verdes.
