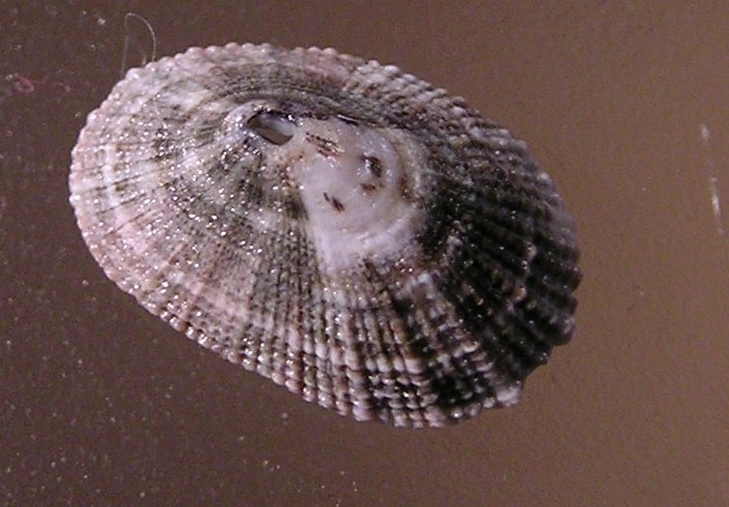
- Dorsal view of a shell of Diodora saturnalis

Scientific classification
- Kingdom: Animalia
- Phylum: Mollusca
- Class: Gastropoda
- Subclass: Vetigastropoda
- Order: Lepetellida
- Family: Fissurellidae
- Subfamily: Fissurellinae
- Genus: Diodora
- Species: D. saturnalis

Binomial name
- Diodora saturnalis (Carpenter, 1864)

= Diodora saturnalis =

Species of gastropod

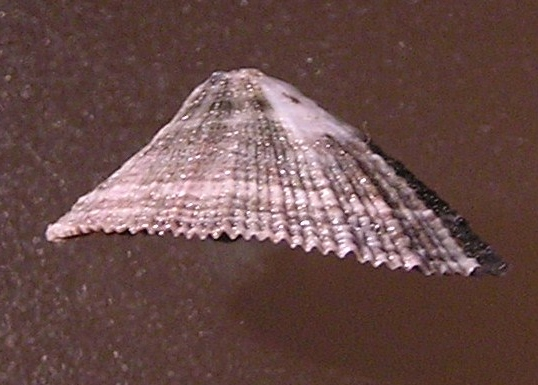
Lateral view of a shell of Diodora saturnalis

Diodora saturnalis is a species of sea snail, a marine gastropod mollusk in the family Fissurellidae, the keyhole limpets and slit limpets.
