= Diodora alta =

Scientific classification
- Kingdom: Animalia
- Phylum: Mollusca
- Class: Gastropoda
- Subclass: Vetigastropoda
- Order: Lepetellida
- Family: Fissurellidae
- Subfamily: Fissurellinae
- Genus: Diodora
- Species: D. alta

Binomial name
- Diodora alta (Adams, 1852)

Synonyms
- Fissurella alta C.B. Adams, 1852 (original combination)

Species of gastropod

Diodora alta is a species of sea snail, a marine gastropod mollusk in the family Fissurellidae, the keyhole limpets and slit limpets.

== Description ==
The size of the shell varies between 7 mm and 14 mm. The high shell has a subconic shape. It is white, often more or less covered with broad ashy black rays, which may be seen through the shell. Its sculpture shows prominent radiating ribs, of which the alternate ones are excessively developed, and intermediate small raised lines. The shell has many concentric ridges, which are less prominent than the larger radiating ribs, and more so than the others. The summit is nearer to and somewhat inclined towards the anterior extremity. The small fissure has an ovate-elliptic shape. The margin is pectinated by the radiating ribs.

== Distribution ==
This species occurs in the Pacific Ocean from the Gulf of California, Western Mexico to North Peru; off the Galápagos Islands.
