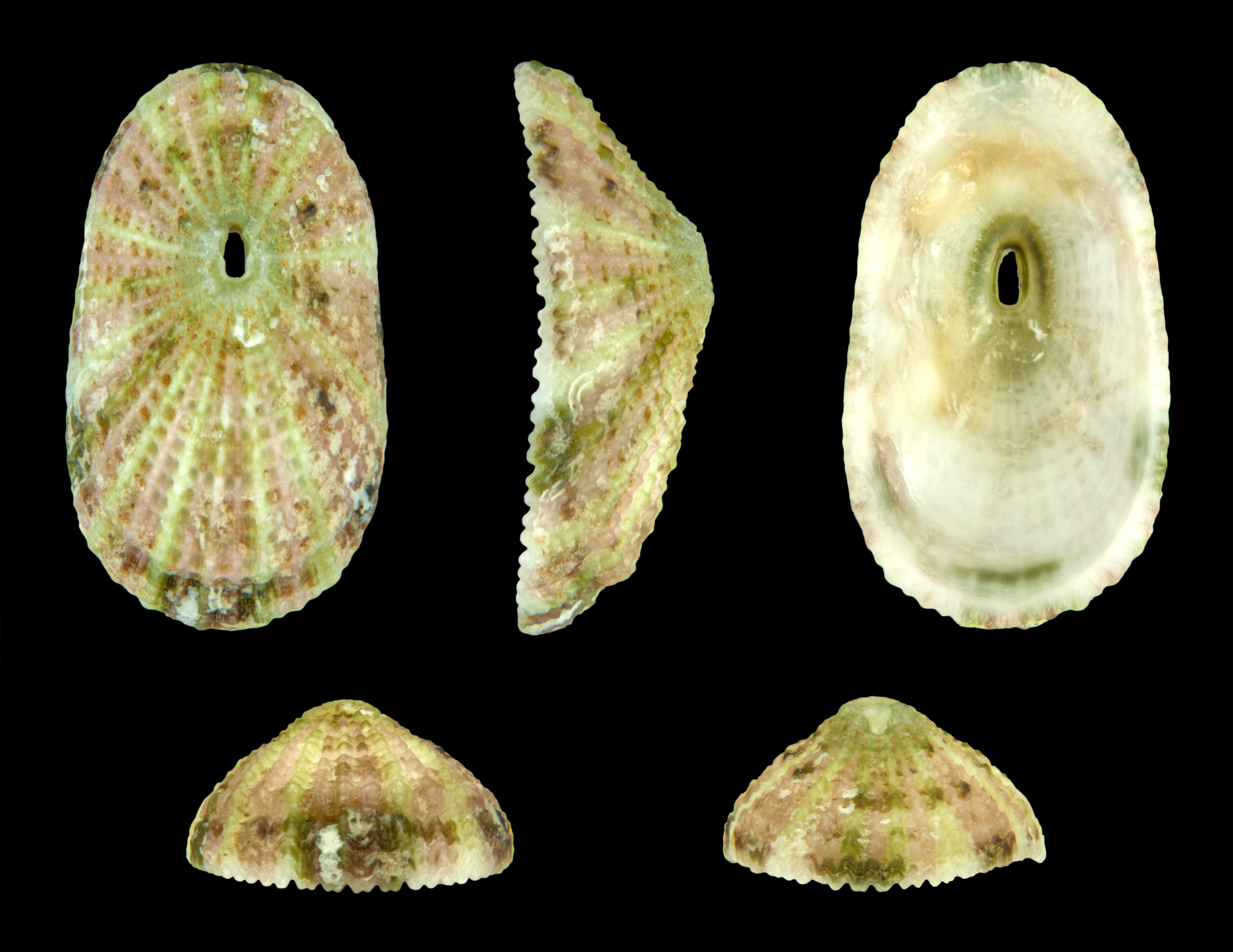

Scientific classification
- Kingdom: Animalia
- Phylum: Mollusca
- Class: Gastropoda
- Subclass: Vetigastropoda
- Order: Lepetellida
- Family: Fissurellidae
- Genus: Diodora
- Species: D. gibberula

Binomial name
- Diodora gibberula (Lamarck, 1822)

Synonyms
- Diodora graeca auct.non Linnaeus, C., 1758; Diodora menkeana auct.non Dunker, 1853; Fissurella gibba Philippi 1836; Fissurella gibberula Lamarck 1822 (original combination); Fissurella gibberula var. elongata Pallary 1900; Fissurella gibberula var. major Pallary 1900; Fissurella philippiana Dunker, 1846

= Diodora gibberula =

Species of gastropod

Diodora gibberula is a species of sea snail, a marine gastropod mollusk in the family Fissurellidae, the keyhole limpets.

== Description ==
The size of the shell varies between 10 mm and 21 mm. The shell is found under stones on rocky bottoms of the infralittoral and circalittoral zones, at depths between about 2 and 10m.

== Distribution ==
This marine species occurs from France to West Africa and the Cape Verdes; in the Mediterranean Sea.
