= Diodora dorsata =

Scientific classification
- Kingdom: Animalia
- Phylum: Mollusca
- Class: Gastropoda
- Subclass: Vetigastropoda
- Order: Lepetellida
- Family: Fissurellidae
- Genus: Diodora
- Species: D. dorsata

Binomial name
- Diodora dorsata (Monterosato, 1878)

Species of gastropod

Diodora dorsata is a species of sea snail, a marine gastropod mollusk in the family Fissurellidae, the keyhole limpets.
