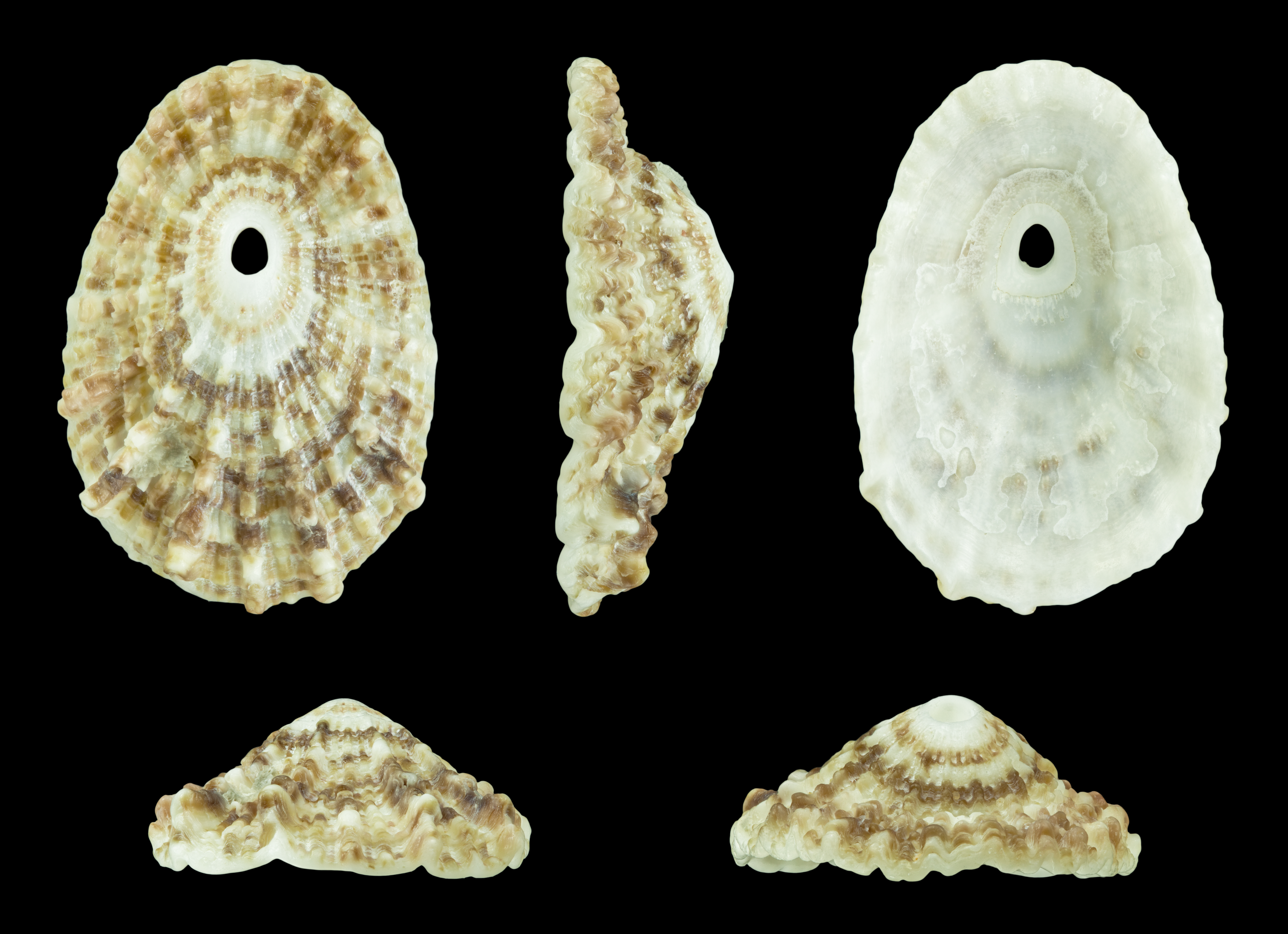

Scientific classification
- Kingdom: Animalia
- Phylum: Mollusca
- Class: Gastropoda
- Subclass: Vetigastropoda
- Order: Lepetellida
- Family: Fissurellidae
- Genus: Diodora
- Species: D. spreta

Binomial name
- Diodora spreta (Smith, 1901)

= Diodora spreta =

Species of gastropod

Diodora spreta is a species of sea snail, a marine gastropod mollusk in the family Fissurellidae, the keyhole limpets.
