= Diodora octagona =

Scientific classification
- Kingdom: Animalia
- Phylum: Mollusca
- Class: Gastropoda
- Subclass: Vetigastropoda
- Order: Lepetellida
- Family: Fissurellidae
- Subfamily: Fissurellinae
- Genus: Diodora
- Species: D. octagona

Binomial name
- Diodora octagona (Reeve, 1850)

Synonyms
- Diodora octogona sic; Diodora reevei Schepman, 1908; Fissurella octagona Reeve, 1850

Species of gastropod

Diodora octagona is a species of sea snail, a marine gastropod mollusk in the family Fissurellidae, the keyhole limpets and slit limpets.
