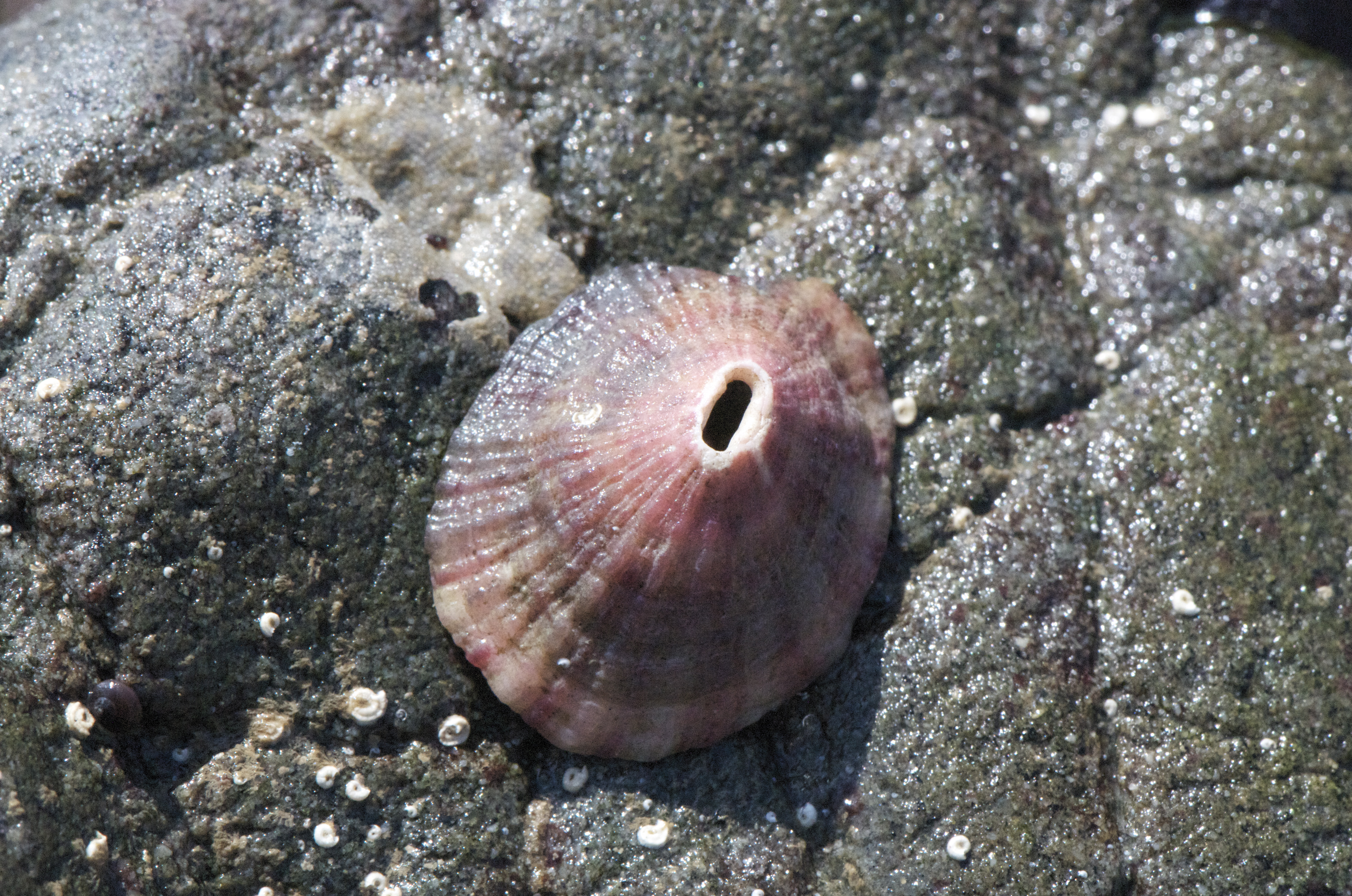
- Fissurella volcano

Scientific classification
- Kingdom: Animalia
- Phylum: Mollusca
- Class: Gastropoda
- Subclass: Vetigastropoda
- Order: Lepetellida
- Superfamily: Fissurelloidea
- Family: Fissurellidae
- Subfamily: Fissurellinae
- Genus: Fissurella; Bruguière, 1789

Type species
- Patella nimbosa Linnaeus, 1758

Synonyms
- Balboaina Pérez Farfante, 1943; Fissurella (Cremides) H. Adams & A. Adams, 1854

= Fissurella =

Genus of gastropods

Fissurella is a genus of small to medium-sized sea snails or limpets, marine gastropod mollusks in the subfamily Fissurellinae of the family Fissurellidae, the keyhole limpets.

== Description ==
The size of the body does not exceed or marginally exceeds that of the shell. The outer radular plate has four cusps. The propodium (= the anterior end of the foot) has no tentacles.

== Ecology ==
Like all other fissurellids, Fissurella species are herbivores, using the radula to scrape up algae from the surface of rocks.

Water for respiration and excretion is drawn in under the edge of the shell and exits through the "keyhole" at the apex.

== Species ==
According to the World Register of Marine Species (WoRMS), the following species with accepted names are included within the genus Fissurella

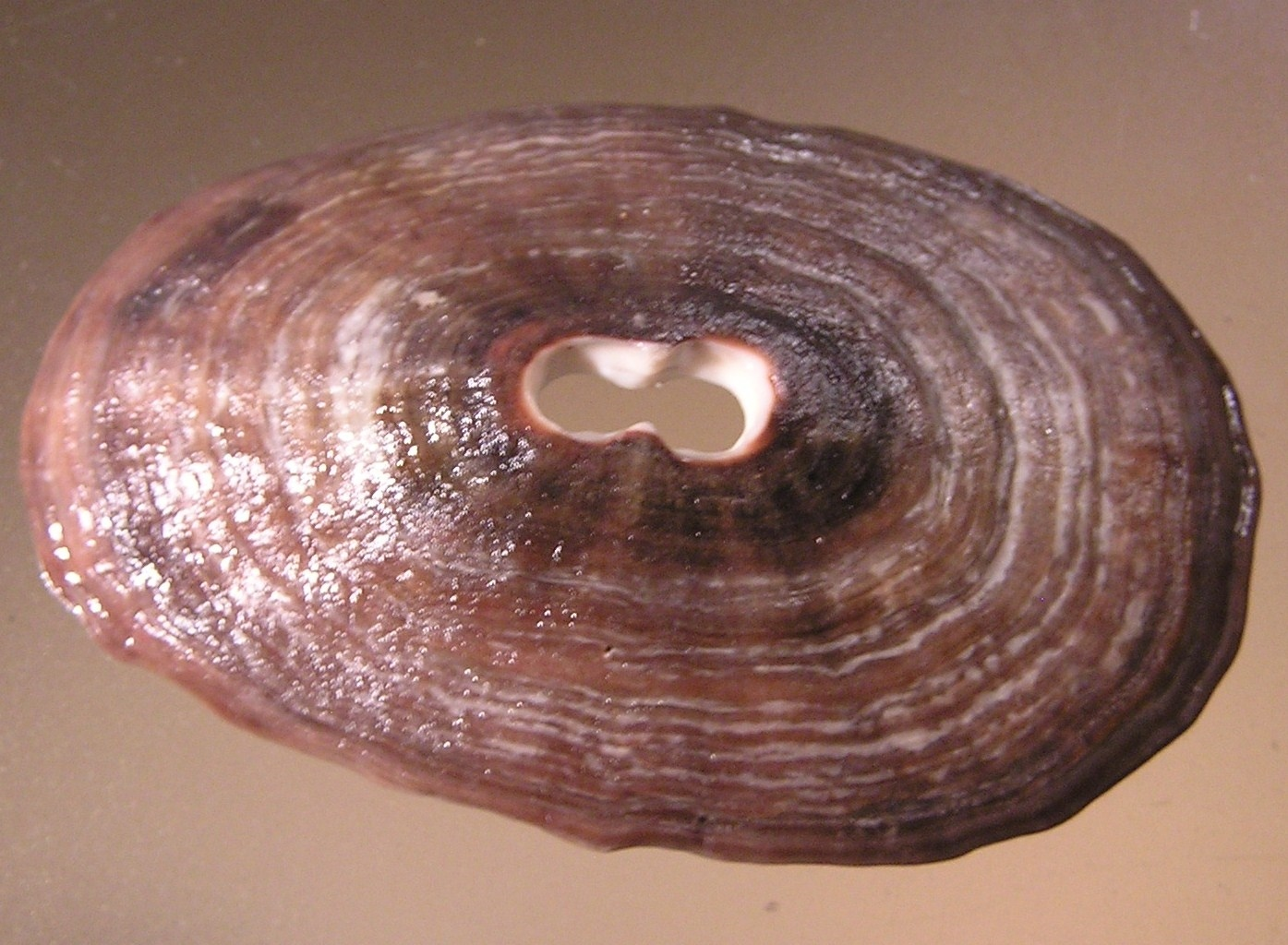
Fissurella crassa

- Fissurella afra Quoy & Gaimard, 1834
- Fissurella alabastrites Reeve, 1849
- † Fissurella altior Meyer & Aldrich, 1896
- Fissurella angusta (Gmelin, 1791)
- † Fissurella apicifera Lozouet, 1999
- Fissurella asperella Sowerby I, 1835 West America
- Fissurella barbadensis (Gmelin, 1791)
- Fissurella barbouri Pérez Farfante, 1943
- Fissurella bravensis F. Salvat, 1967
- Fissurella bridgesii Reeve, 1849
- Fissurella clenchi Pérez Farfante, 1943
- Fissurella coarctata King & Broderip, 1831
- Fissurella costaria Deshayes, 1824
- Fissurella costata Lesson, 1830 Southwest America
- Fissurella crassa Lamarck, 1822 Arctic
- Fissurella cumingi Reeve, 1849 Chile
- Fissurella cyathulum Reeve, 1850
- Fissurella decemcostata F. S. Mclean, 1970 West America
- Fissurella deroyae F. S. Mclean, 1970 West America
- Fissurella emmanuelae Métivier, 1970
- Fissurella fascicularis Lamarck, 1822
- Fissurella fischeri F. Salvat, 1967
- Fissurella formosa F. Salvat, 1967
- Fissurella gaillardi F. Salvat, 1967
- Fissurella gemmata Menke, 1847 West America
- Fissurella hendrickxi Suárez-Mozo & Geiger, 2017
- Fissurella latimarginata Sowerby I, 1835 Chile
- Fissurella limbata Sowerby I, 1835 Chile
- Fissurella longifissa Sowerby II, 1862
- Fissurella macrotrema Sowerby I, 1835 West America
- Fissurella maxima Sowerby I, 1835 West America
- Fissurella mesoatlantica Simone, 2008
- Fissurella microtrema Sowerby I, 1835
- Fissurella morrisoni F. S. Mclean, 1970 West America
- Fissurella mutabilis Sowerby I, 1835
- Fissurella natalensis Krauss, 1848
- Fissurella nigra Lesson, 1831
- Fissurella nigrocincta Carpenter, 1856 West America
- Fissurella nimbosa (Linnaeus, 1758)
- Fissurella nodosa (Born, 1778)
- Fissurella nubecula (Linnaeus, 1758)
- Fissurella obscura Sowerby I, 1835 West America
- Fissurella oriens Sowerby I, 1835
- Fissurella peruviana Lamarck, 1822 Southeast Pacific
  - Fissurella peruviana occidens A. A. Gould, Southeast Pacific
- Fissurella picta (Gmelin, 1791)
- Fissurella pulchra Sowerby I, 1834
- Fissurella punctata Pérez Farfante, 1943
- Fissurella radiosa Lesson, 1831
  - Fissurella radiosa radiosa Lesson, 1831
  - Fissurella radiosa tixierae Métivier, 1969
- † Fissurella rixfordi Hertlein, 1928
- † Fissurella robusta Sowerby III, 1889
- Fissurella rosea (Gmelin, 1791)
- Fissurella rubropicta Pilsbry, 1890 West America
- Fissurella salvatiana Christiaens, 1982
- Fissurella savignyi Pallary, 1926
- Fissurella schrammii Fischer, 1857
- Fissurella spongiosa Carpenter, 1857 West America
- † Fissurella stantoni C. L. Powell & Geiger, 2019
- Fissurella subrostrata Sowerby I, 1835
- Fissurella vaillanti P. Fischer, 1865
- Fissurella verna Gould, 1846
- Fissurella virescens Sowerby I, 1835 West America
- Fissurella volcano Reeve, 1849

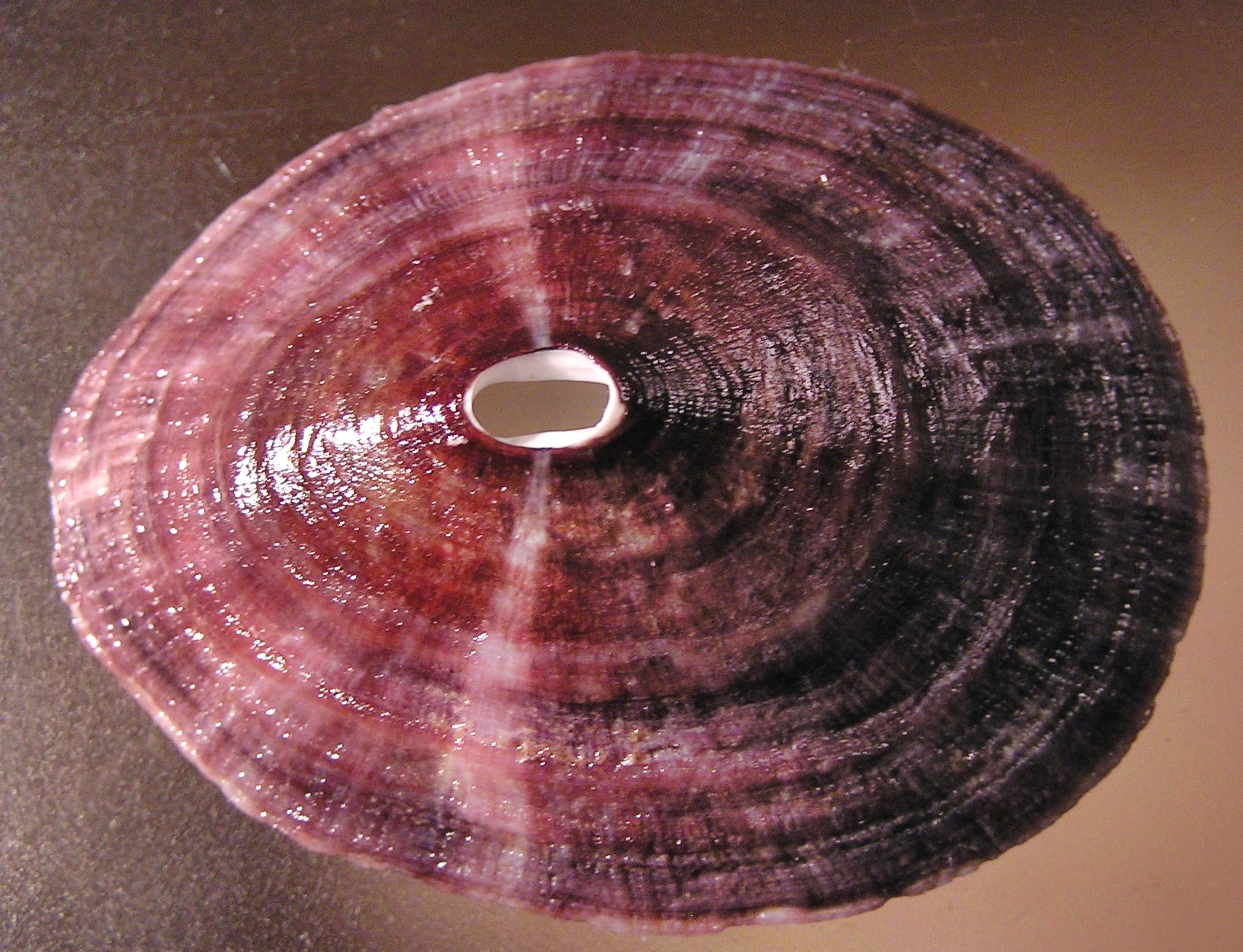
Fissurella latimarginata

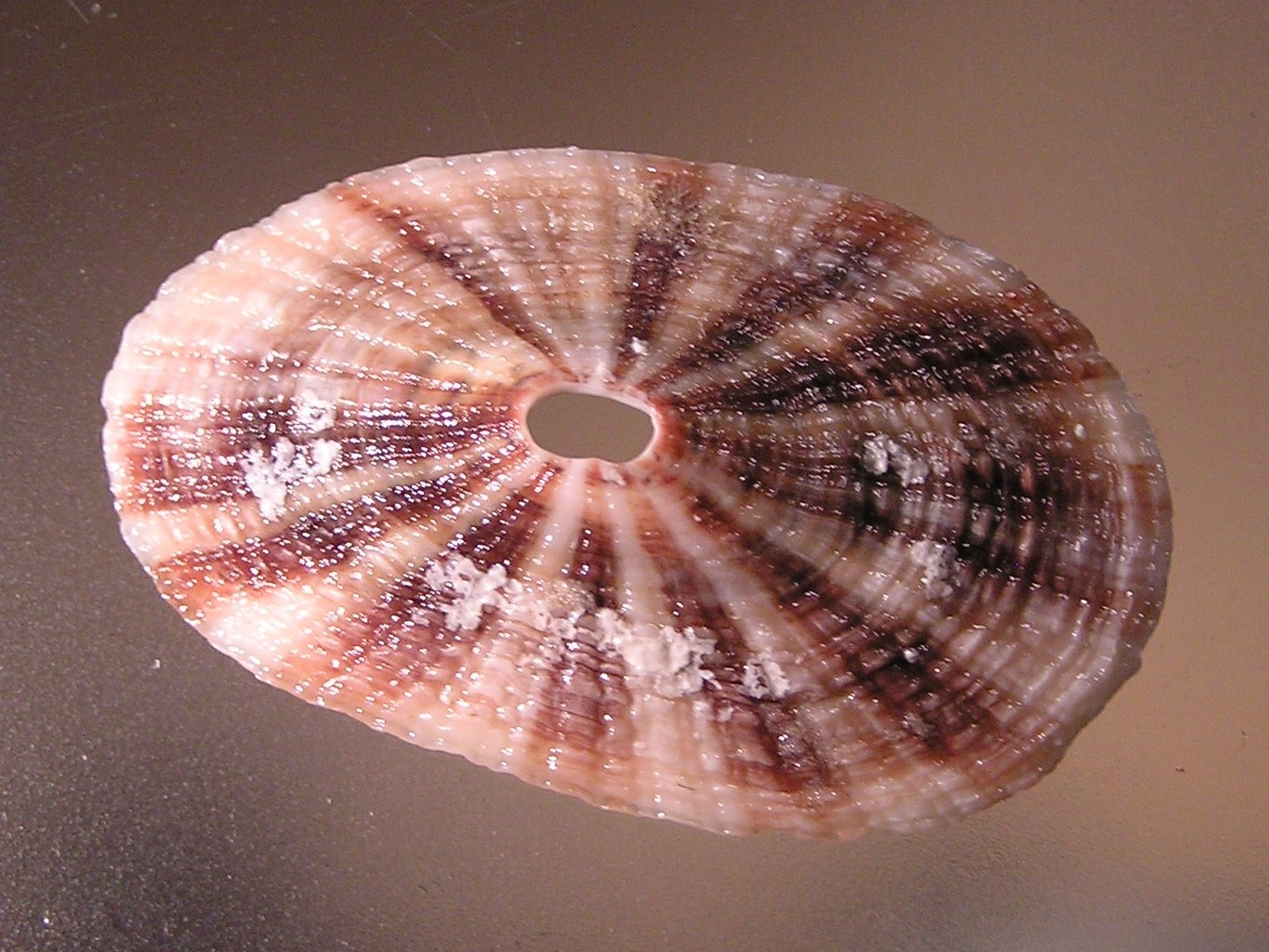
Fissurella maxima

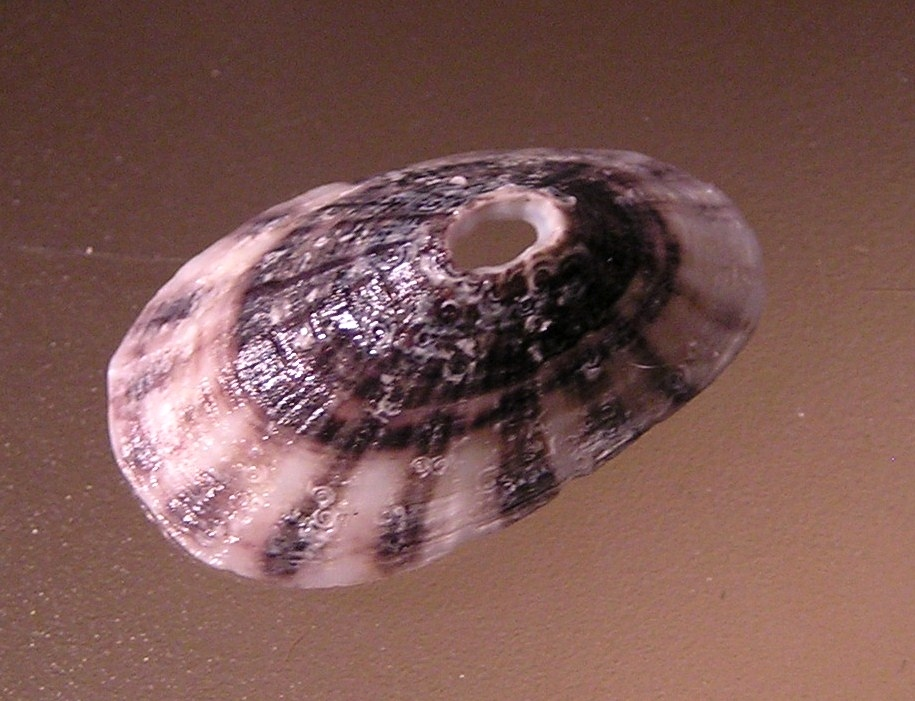
Fissurella radiosa tixierae, apical view

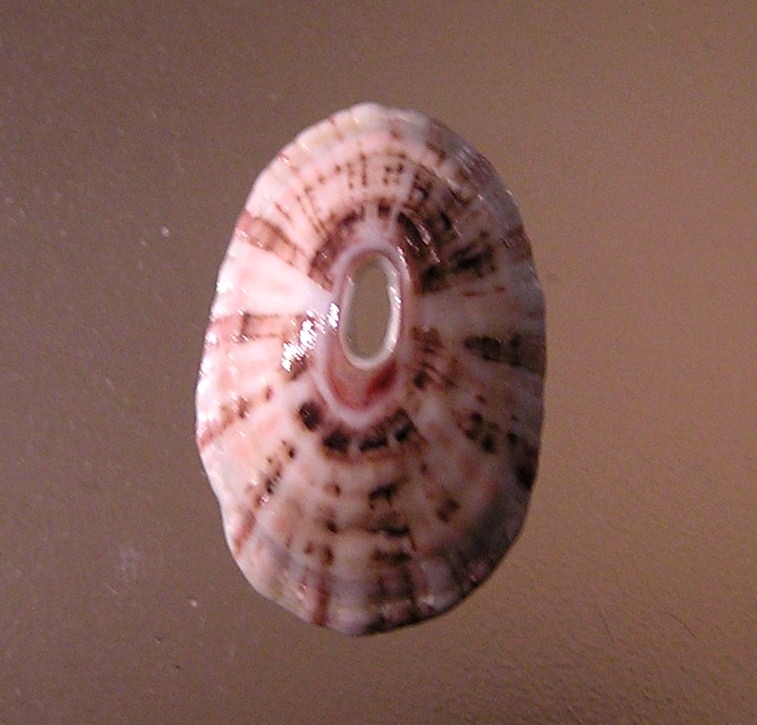
Fissurella rubropicta

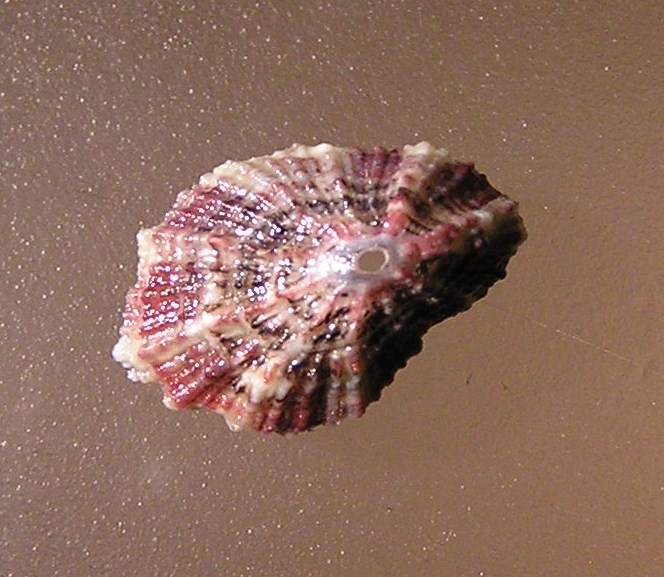
Fissurella virescens

The Indo-Pacific Molluscan Database adds the following species to the list

- Fissurella delicata Smith, 1899
- Fissurella excelsa Adams & Reeve, 1850
- Fissurella sibogae Schepman, 1908

The following species are also mentioned by Schooner specimen shells. This list may contain synonyms.

- Fissurella gemmulata L. A. Reeve, 1850 Puerto Rico
- Fissurella glaucopsis L. A. Reeve, 1850 Cape Verde
- Fissurella humphreysi L. A. Reeve, 1850 Cape Verde
- Fissurella nodosa crusoe Pérez Farfante, Trinidad

Species brought into synonymy

- Fissurella aequalis G.B. Sowerby I, 1835: synonym of Lucapinella aequalis (G.B. Sowerby I, 1835)
- Fissurella affinis Gray in G.B. Sowerby I, 1835: synonym of Fissurella peruviana Lamarck, 1822
- Fissurella alba Philippi, 1845: synonym of Fissurella oriens G.B. Sowerby I, 1834
- Fissurella alboradiata Turton, 1932: synonym of Fissurella mutabilis G. B. Sowerby I, 1835
- Fissurella alta C. B. Adams, 1852: synonym of Diodora alta (C. B. Adams, 1852)
- Fissurella alternata Say, 1822: synonym of Diodora cayenensis (Lamarck, 1822)
- Fissurella aperta G.B. Sowerby I, 1825: synonym of Pupillaea aperta (Sowerby I, 1825)
- Fissurella arcuata G. B. Sowerby II, 1862: synonym of Diodora arcuata (G. B. Sowerby II, 1862)
- Fissurella arenicola Rochebrune & Mabille, 1885: synonym of Fissurella oriens G.B. Sowerby I, 1834
- Fissurella aspera Rathke, 1833: synonym of Diodora aspera (Rathke, 1833)
- Fissurella atrata Reeve, 1850: synonym of Fissurella picta (Gmelin, 1791)
- Fissurella australis Philippi, 1845: synonym of Fissurella oriens G.B. Sowerby I, 1834
- Fissurella australis Krauss, 1848: synonym of Diodora kraussi Herbert & Warén, 1999
- Fissurella bella Reeve, 1849: synonym of Fissurella latimarginata G.B. Sowerby I, 1835
- Fissurella biradiata G.B. Sowerby I, 1835: synonym of Fissurella latimarginata G.B. Sowerby I, 1835
- Fissurella bombayana G. B. Sowerby II, 1862: synonym of Diodora singaporensis (Reeve, 1850)
- Fissurella calyculata G. B. Sowerby I, 1823: synonym of Diodora calyculata (G. B. Sowerby I, 1823)
- Fissurella canalifera G. Nevill & H. Nevill, 1869: synonym of Lucapinella canalifera (G. Nevill & H. Nevill, 1869)
- Fissurella candida G. B. Sowerby I, 1835: synonym of Diodora candida (G. B. Sowerby I, 1835)
- Fissurella cayenensis Lamarck, 1822: synonym of Diodora cayenensis (Lamarck, 1822)
- Fissurella chemnitzii G. B. Sowerby I, 1835: synonym of Medusafissurella chemnitzii (G. B. Sowerby I, 1835)
- Fissurella cheullina Ramirez-Boehme, 1974: synonym of Fissurella oriens G.B. Sowerby I, 1834
- Fissurella chilensis G.B. Sowerby I, 1835: synonym of Fissurella costata Lesson, 1831
- Fissurella cinnabrina Costa O.G., 1839: synonym of Fissurella nubecula (Linnaeus, 1758)
- Fissurella clathrata Reeve, 1849: synonym of Diodora clathrata (Reeve, 1849)
- Fissurella clypeiformis G.B. Sowerby I, 1825: synonym of Fissurella crassa Lamarck, 1822
- Fissurella clypeus G.B. Sowerby I, 1835: synonym of Fissurella peruviana Lamarck, 1822
- Fissurella compressa Thiele, 1930: synonym of Amblychilepas compressa (Thiele, 1930)
- Fissurella concatenata Crosse & P. Fischer, 1864: synonym of Cosmetalepas concatenata (Crosse & P. Fischer, 1864)
- Fissurella concinna Philippi, 1845: synonym of Fissurella maxima G.B. Sowerby I, 1834
- Fissurella corbicula Sowerby, 1862: synonym of Diodora corbicula (Sowerby, 1862)
- Fissurella corrugata Costa O.G., 1839: synonym of Diodora graeca (Linnaeus, 1758)
- Fissurella cruciata Gould, 1846: synonym of Diodora cruciata (Gould, 1846)
- Fissurella cruciata Krauss, 1848: synonym of Diodora cruciata (Gould, 1846)
- Fissurella darwinii Reeve, 1849: synonym of Fissurella radiosa Lesson, 1831
- Fissurella depressa Lamarck, 1822: synonym of Fissurella crassa Lamarck, 1822
- Fissurella digueti Mabille, 1895: synonym of Diodora digueti (Mabille, 1895)
- Fissurella doellojuradoi Perez-Farfante, 1952: synonym of Fissurella oriens G.B. Sowerby I, 1834
- Fissurella dominicana Costa O.G., 1839: synonym of Diodora graeca (Linnaeus, 1758)
- Fissurella dorsata Monterosato, 1878: synonym of Diodora dorsata (Monterosato, 1878)
- Fissurella dozei Rochebrune & Mabille, 1885: synonym of Fissurella radiosa Lesson, 1831
- Fissurella dubia Reeve, 1849: synonym of Amblychilepas dubia (Reeve, 1849)
- Fissurella elevata Dunker, 1846: synonym of Diodora elevata (Dunker, 1846)
- Fissurella exquisita Reeve, 1850: synonym of Fissurella radiosa Lesson, 1831
- Fissurella flavida Philippi, 1857: synonym of Fissurella oriens G.B. Sowerby I, 1834
- Fissurella fluviana Dall, 1889: synonym of Diodora fluviana (Dall, 1889)
- Fissurella fontainiana d'Orbigny, 1841: synonym of Diodora fontainiana (d'Orbigny, 1841)
- Fissurella foresti F. Salvat, 1967: synonym of Fissurella salvatiana Christiaens, 1974
- Fissurella fulvescens G.B. Sowerby I, 1835: synonym of Fissurella oriens G.B. Sowerby I, 1834
- Fissurella fumata Reeve, 1850: synonym of Diodora cayenensis (Lamarck, 1822)
- Fissurella funiculata Reeve, 1850: synonym of Diodora funiculata (Reeve, 1850)
- Fissurella galericulum Reeve, 1850: synonym of Fissurella latimarginata G.B. Sowerby I, 1835
- Fissurella gibba Philippi, 1836: synonym of Diodora gibberula (Lamarck, 1822)
- Fissurella gibberula Lamarck, 1822: synonym of Diodora gibberula (Lamarck, 1822)
- Fissurella graeca (Linnaeus, 1758): synonym of Diodora graeca (Linnaeus, 1758)
- Fissurella grandis G.B. Sowerby I, 1835: synonym of Fissurella nigra Lesson, 1831
- Fissurella granifera Pease, 1861: synonym of Diodora granifera (Pease, 1861)
- Fissurella grisea Reeve, 1849: synonym of Fissurella radiosa Lesson, 1831
- Fissurella hedeia Rochebrune & Mabille, 1885: synonym of Fissurella oriens G.B. Sowerby I, 1834
- Fissurella henseli Martens, 1900: synonym of Lucapinella henseli (Martens, 1900)
- Fissurella hiantula Lamarck, 1822: synonym of Dendrofissurella scutellum hiantula (Lamarck, 1822)
- Fissurella hondurasensis Reeve, 1849: synonym of Fissurella maxima G.B. Sowerby I, 1834
- Fissurella huttoni Suter, 1906: synonym of Fissurella rosea (Gmelin, 1791)
- Fissurella inaequalis G. B. Sowerby I, 1835: synonym of Diodora inaequalis (G. B. Sowerby I, 1835)
- Fissurella incarnata Krauss, 1848: synonym of Dendrofissurella scutellum hiantula (Lamarck, 1822)
- Fissurella incii Reeve, 1850: synonym of Diodora lineata (G.B. Sowerby I, 1835)
- Fissurella indistincta Turton, 1932: synonym of Fissurella natalensis Krauss, 1848
- Fissurella indusica Reeve, 1850: synonym of Diodora funiculata (Reeve, 1850)
- Fissurella italica Defrance, 1820: synonym of Diodora italica (Defrance, 1820)
- Fissurella javanicensis Lamarck, 1822: synonym of Amblychilepas javanicensis (Lamarck, 1822)
- Fissurella jukesii Reeve, 1850: synonym of Diodora jukesii (Reeve, 1850)
- Fissurella lanceolata Sowerby, 1862: synonym of Diodora corbicula (Sowerby, 1862)
- Fissurella larva Reeve, 1850: synonym of Diodora cayenensis (Lamarck, 1822)
- Fissurella lata G.B. Sowerby I, 1835: synonym of Fissurella picta (Gmelin, 1791)
- Fissurella lentiginosa Reeve, 1850: synonym of Diodora lentiginosa (Reeve, 1850)
- Fissurella lilacina Costa O.G., 1839: synonym of Fissurella nubecula (Linnaeus, 1758)
- Fissurella lima G.B Sowerby II, 1862: synonym of Diodora lima (G.B. Sowerby II, 1862)
- Fissurella lineata G.B. Sowerby I, 1835: synonym of Diodora lineata (G.B. Sowerby I, 1835)
- Fissurella mamillata Risso, 1826: synonym of Diodora graeca (Linnaeus, 1758)
- Fissurella mediterranea Gray J.E. in Sowerby G.B. I, 1835: synonym of Diodora italica (Defrance, 1820)
- Fissurella melvilli G. B. Sowerby III, 1882: synonym of Medusafissurella melvilli (G. B. Sowerby III, 1882)
- Fissurella menkeana Dunker, 1846: synonym of Diodora menkeana (Dunker, 1846)
- Fissurella mexicana G.B. Sowerby I, 1835: synonym of Fissurella oriens G.B. Sowerby I, 1834
- Fissurella miranda de Gregorio, 1885: synonym of Diodora graeca (Linnaeus, 1758)
- Fissurella miriga de Gregorio, 1885: synonym of Diodora dorsata (Monterosato, 1878)
- Fissurella mondelloensis de Gregorio, 1885: synonym of Fissurella nubecula (Linnaeus, 1758)
- Fissurella muricata Reeve, 1850: synonym of Fissurella picta (Gmelin, 1791)
- Fissurella navicula Turton, 1932: synonym of Fissurella mutabilis G. B. Sowerby I, 1835
- Fissurella navidensis Ramirez-Boehme, 1974: synonym of Fissurella picta (Gmelin, 1791)
- Fissurella neglecta Deshayes, 1830: synonym of Diodora italica (Defrance, 1820)
- Fissurella nigra Philippi, 1845: synonym of Fissurella radiosa Lesson, 1831
- Fissurella nigriadiata Reeve, 1850: synonym of Diodora ruppellii (G. B. Sowerby I, 1835)
- Fissurella nigrita G. B. Sowerby I, 1835: synonym of Amblychilepas nigrita (G. B. Sowerby I, 1835)
- Fissurella oblonga Ramirez-Boehme, 1974: synonym of Fissurella oriens G.B. Sowerby I, 1834
- Fissurella oblonga Menke, 1843: synonym of Amblychilepas oblonga (Menke, 1843)
- Fissurella occidens Gould, 1846: synonym of Fissurella peruviana Lamarck, 1822
- Fissurella occitanica Récluz, 1843: synonym of Diodora graeca (Linnaeus, 1758)
- Fissurella octagona Reeve, 1850: synonym of Diodora octagona (Reeve, 1850)
- Fissurella omicron Crosse & P. Fischer, 1864: synonym of Amblychilepas omicron (Crosse & P. Fischer, 1864)
- Fissurella panamensis G. B. Sowerby I, 1835: synonym of Diodora panamensis (G. B. Sowerby I, 1835)
- Fissurella papudana Ramirez-Boehme, 1974: synonym of Fissurella peruviana Lamarck, 1822
- Fissurella parviforata Sowerby III, 1889: synonym of Diodora parviforata (Sowerby III, 1889)
- Fissurella philippiana Reeve, 1850: synonym of Fissurella radiosa Lesson, 1831
- Fissurella philippiana Dunker, 1846: synonym of Diodora philippiana (Dunker, 1846)
- Fissurella philippii Hupé, 1854: synonym of Fissurella radiosa Lesson, 1831
- Fissurella philippii Requien, 1848: synonym of Fissurella nubecula (Linnaeus, 1758)
- Fissurella pica G. B. Sowerby I, 1835: synonym of Diodora pica (G. B. Sowerby I, 1835)
- Fissurella pileopsoides Reeve, 1850: synonym of Diodora pileopsoides (Reeve, 1850)
- Fissurella pluridenta Mabille, 1895: synonym of Diodora inaequalis (G. B. Sowerby I, 1835)
- Fissurella polygona G.B. Sowerby II, 1862: synonym of Fissurella radiosa Lesson, 1831
- Fissurella producta Monterosato, 1880: synonym of Diodora producta (Monterosato, 1880)
- Fissurella punctatissima Pilsbry, 1890: synonym of Fissurella latimarginata G.B. Sowerby I, 1835
- Fissurella quadriradiata Reeve, 1850: synonym of Diodora quadriradiata (Reeve, 1850)
- Fissurella radiola Deshayes, 1830: synonym of Fissurella picta (Gmelin, 1791)
- Fissurella recurvata Costa O.G., 1839: synonym of Diodora graeca (Linnaeus, 1758)
- Fissurella reticulata (Da Costa, 1778): synonym of Diodora graeca (Linnaeus, 1758)
- Fissurella reticulata Liénard, 1877: synonym of Diodora ruppellii (G. B. Sowerby I, 1835)
- Fissurella rota Reeve, 1850: synonym of Fissurella mutabilis G. B. Sowerby I, 1835
- Fissurella rubiginosa Hutton, 1873: synonym of Radiacmea inconspicua (Gray, 1843)
- Fissurella rudis Deshayes, 1830: synonym of Fissurella costata Lesson, 1831
- Fissurella ruppelli G.B. Sowerby I, 1835: synonym of Diodora rueppellii (G.B. Sowerby I, 1835)
- Fissurella sagittata Reeve, 1849: synonym of Fissurella mutabilis G. B. Sowerby I, 1835
- Fissurella saharica Locard, 1897: synonym of Diodora dorsata (Monterosato, 1878)
- Fissurella salebrosa Reeve, 1850: synonym of Medusafissurella salebrosa (Reeve, 1850)
- Fissurella sayi Dall, 1889: synonym of Diodora sayi (Dall, 1889)
- Fissurella sculpturata Turton, 1932: synonym of Diodora levicostata (E. A. Smith, 1914)
- Fissurella scutellum Gray in G. B. Sowerby, 1835: synonym of Amblychilepas javanicensis (Lamarck, 1822)
- Fissurella similis Sowerby, 1862: synonym of Diodora jukesii (Reeve, 1850)
- Fissurella singaporensis Reeve, 1850: synonym of Diodora singaporensis (Reeve, 1850)
- Fissurella solida Philippi, 1845: synonym of Fissurella maxima G.B. Sowerby I, 1834
- Fissurella squamosa Hutton, 1873: synonym of Fissurella rosea (Gmelin, 1791)
- Fissurella stellata Reeve, 1850: synonym of Fissurella cumingi Reeve, 1849
- Fissurella subrotunda Deshayes, 1830: synonym of Fissurella peruviana Lamarck, 1822
- Fissurella tanneri A. E. Verrill, 1882: synonym of Diodora tanneri (A. E. Verrill, 1882)
- Fissurella tarnieri [sic]: synonym of Fissurella tanneri A. E. Verrill, 1882: synonym of Diodora tanneri (A. E. Verrill, 1882)
- Fissurella tasmaniensis Bonnet, 1864: synonym of Amblychilepas javanicensis (Lamarck, 1822)
- Fissurella tenuistriata Sowerby, 1862: synonym of Diodora singaporensis (Reeve, 1850)
- Fissurella ticaonica Reeve, 1850: synonym of Diodora ticaonica (Reeve, 1850)
- Fissurella tixierae Métivier, 1969: synonym of Fissurella radiosa Lesson, 1831
- Fissurella townsendi Melvill, 1897: synonym of Diodora singaporensis (Reeve, 1850)
- Fissurella trapezina G. B. Sowerby I, 1835: synonym of Amblychilepas javanicensis (Lamarck, 1822)
- Fissurella variegata G.B. Sowerby II, 1862: synonym of Diodora variegata (G. B. Sowerby II, 1862)
- Fissurella viminea Reeve, 1850: synonym of Diodora cayenensis (Lamarck, 1822)
- Fissurella violacea Rathke, 1833: synonym of Fissurella nigra Lesson, 1831
- Fissurella viridis Costa O.G., 1839: synonym of Fissurella nubecula (Linnaeus, 1758)
- Fissurella vitoensis de Gregorio, 1885: synonym of Diodora italica (Defrance, 1820)
