= F. formosa =

F. formosa may refer to:

- Fissurella formosa, a sea snail
- Fodinoidea formosa, a Malagasy moth
- Fouquieria formosa, a desert plant
