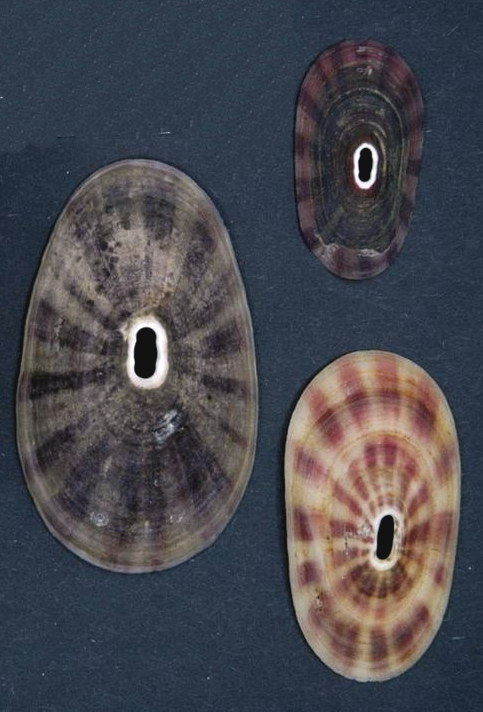
- Three shells of Fissurella oriens oriens (museum specimens at Naturalis Biodiversity Center)

Scientific classification
- Kingdom: Animalia
- Phylum: Mollusca
- Class: Gastropoda
- Subclass: Vetigastropoda
- Order: Lepetellida
- Family: Fissurellidae
- Genus: Fissurella
- Species: F. oriens

Binomial name
- Fissurella oriens Sowerby I, 1834

Synonyms
- Fissurella narpi N. Rojas y D. Jara, 2014; Fissurella alba Philippi, 1845; Fissurella arenicola Rochebrune & Mabille, 1885; Fissurella australis Philippi, 1845; Fissurella cheullina Ramirez-Boehme, 1974; Fissurella doellojuradoi Perez-Farfante, 1952; Fissurella flavida Philippi, 1857; Fissurella fulvescens Sowerby I, 1835; Fissurella hedeia Rochebrune & Mabille, 1885; Fissurella mexicana Sowerby I, 1835; Fissurella oblonga Ramirez-Boehme, 1974

= Fissurella oriens =

Species of gastropod

Fissurella oriens is a species of sea snail, a marine gastropod mollusk in the family Fissurellidae, the keyhole limpets.

There are two subspecies known :

- Fissurella oriens fulvescens G.B. Sowerby I, 1835 : found in the Pacific Ocean along Chile.
- Fissurella oriens oriens G.B. Sowerby I, 1834 : the Rising Sun Keyhole Limpet; found along the Falkland Islands and Isla Chiloé, Chile (represented as Fissurella oriens G. B. Sowerby I, 1834)

== Description ==
The size of an adult shell varies between 30 mm and 70 mm.

== Distribution ==
Pacific Ocean along Chile.
