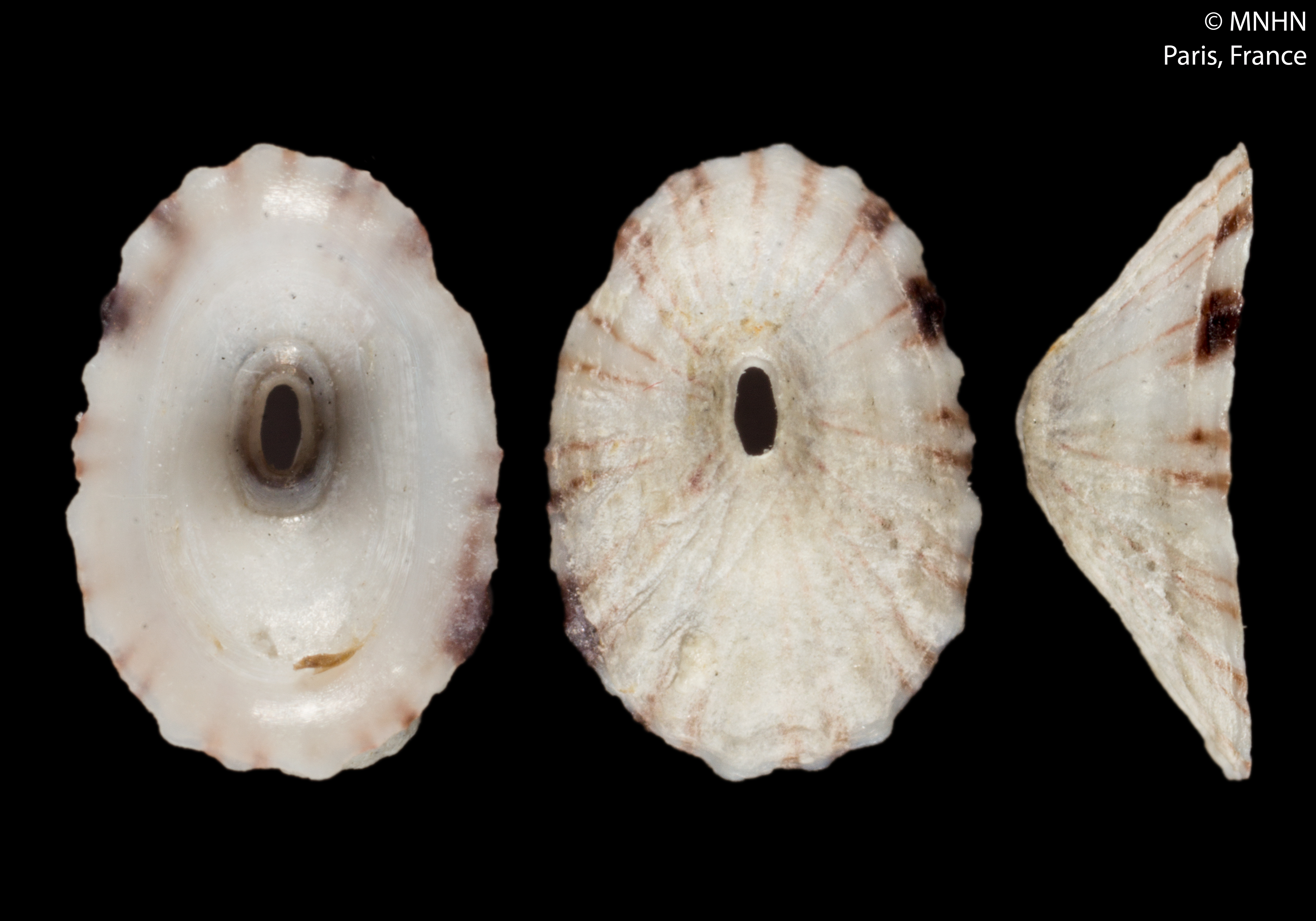
- Shell of Fissurella bravensis (holotype at MNHN, Paris)

Scientific classification
- Kingdom: Animalia
- Phylum: Mollusca
- Class: Gastropoda
- Subclass: Vetigastropoda
- Order: Lepetellida
- Family: Fissurellidae
- Genus: Fissurella
- Species: F. bravensis

Binomial name
- Fissurella bravensis F. Salvat, 1967

= Fissurella bravensis =

Species of gastropod

Fissurella bravensis is a species of sea snail, a marine gastropod mollusk in the family Fissurellidae, the keyhole limpets.

== Description ==
The length of the shell attains 5 mm (0.20 in).

== Distribution ==
This marine species occurs off Cape Verde.
