= Fissurella cumingi =

Scientific classification
- Kingdom: Animalia
- Phylum: Mollusca
- Class: Gastropoda
- Subclass: Vetigastropoda
- Order: Lepetellida
- Family: Fissurellidae
- Genus: Fissurella
- Species: F. cumingi

Binomial name
- Fissurella cumingi Reeve, 1849

Synonyms
- Fissurella stellata Reeve, 1850

Species of gastropod

Fissurella cumingi is a species of sea snail, a marine gastropod mollusk in the family Fissurellidae, the keyhole limpets.

== Description ==
The size of an adult shell varies between 80 mm and 100 mm.

Fissurella cumingi is a grazer and a host of Proctoeces lintoni and Proctoeces humboldti.

== Distribution ==
This species is distributed in the Pacific Ocean along Chile.
