= Fissurella afra =

Scientific classification
- Kingdom: Animalia
- Phylum: Mollusca
- Class: Gastropoda
- Subclass: Vetigastropoda
- Order: Lepetellida
- Family: Fissurellidae
- Genus: Fissurella
- Species: F. afra

Binomial name
- Fissurella afra Quoy & Gaimard, 1834

Synonyms
- Fissurella de Praya

Species of gastropod

Fissurella afra is a species of keyhole limpet (marine gastropod mollusc) in the family Fissurellidae.

== Description ==
The shell of F. afra is ovate-oblong and convex with a moderately elevated, subcentral apex. The foramen (keyhole) is ovate and slightly constricted medially; the exterior shows fine radiating striae with darker violet-brown bands on a pale background, and the interior is typically whitish. Historic authors distinguished it from Diodora nimbosa by the more elevated summit and a foramen positioned further forward.

== Distribution ==
Fissurella afra is recorded from the Cape Verde Islands, including Santiago (São Tiago). Additional taxonomic and occurrence metadata are aggregated by NOAA Copepedia.

== Taxonomy ==
The species was described by Quoy & Gaimard in 1834 during the voyage of the Astrolabe. The name Fissurella de Praya has been treated as a synonym of F. afra in modern databases.
