= Fissurella barbouri =

Scientific classification
- Kingdom: Animalia
- Phylum: Mollusca
- Class: Gastropoda
- Subclass: Vetigastropoda
- Order: Lepetellida
- Family: Fissurellidae
- Genus: Fissurella
- Species: F. barbouri

Binomial name
- Fissurella barbouri Farfante, 1943

Species of gastropod

Fissurella barbouri is a species of small sea snail or true limpet, a marine gastropod mollusk in the family Fissurellidae, the keyhole limpets.
