= Fissurella spongiosa =

Scientific classification
- Kingdom: Animalia
- Phylum: Mollusca
- Class: Gastropoda
- Subclass: Vetigastropoda
- Order: Lepetellida
- Family: Fissurellidae
- Subfamily: Fissurellinae
- Genus: Fissurella
- Species: F. spongiosa

Binomial name
- Fissurella spongiosa Carpenter, 1857

Species of gastropod

Fissurella spongiosa is a species of sea snail, a marine gastropod mollusk in the family Fissurellidae, the keyhole limpets and slit limpets.
