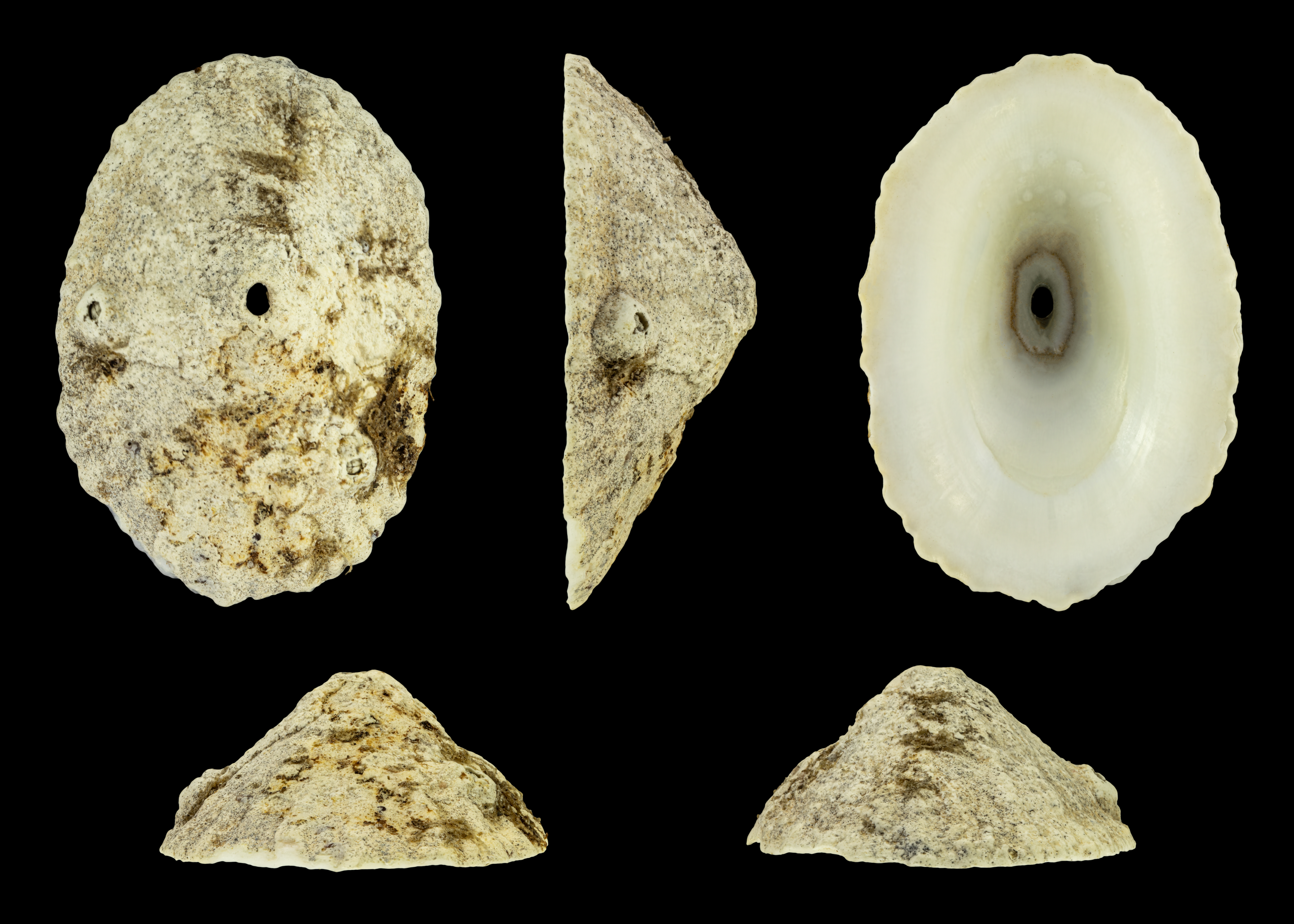
- Five views of the shell of Fissurella verna

Scientific classification
- Kingdom: Animalia
- Phylum: Mollusca
- Class: Gastropoda
- Subclass: Vetigastropoda
- Order: Lepetellida
- Family: Fissurellidae
- Genus: Fissurella
- Species: F. verna

Binomial name
- Fissurella verna Gould, 1846

= Fissurella verna =

Species of gastropod

Fissurella verna is a species of sea snail, a marine gastropod mollusk in the family Fissurellidae, the keyhole limpets.

== Description ==
The size of the shell varies between 20 mm and 51 mm.

== Distribution ==
This marine species occurs in the Atlantic Ocean off the Cape Verdes. It is considered part of the endemic fissurellid fauna of the islands.
