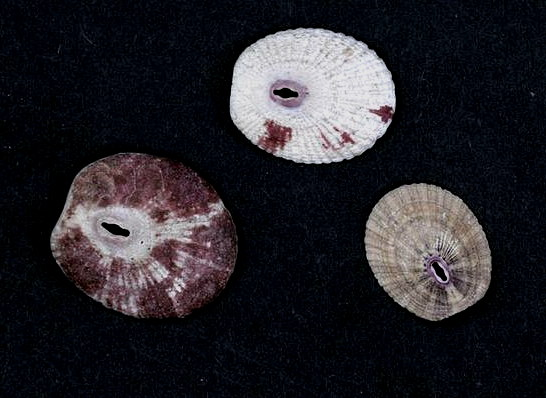
- Three shells of Fissurella punctata (museum specimens at Naturalis Biodiversity Center)

Scientific classification
- Kingdom: Animalia
- Phylum: Mollusca
- Class: Gastropoda
- Subclass: Vetigastropoda
- Order: Lepetellida
- Family: Fissurellidae
- Subfamily: Fissurellinae
- Genus: Fissurella
- Species: F. punctata

Binomial name
- Fissurella punctata Pérez Farfante, 1943

Synonyms
- Fissurella punctata var. rosea Nowell-Usticke, G.W., 1969

= Fissurella punctata =

Species of gastropod

Fissurella punctata is a species of sea snail, a marine gastropod mollusk in the family Fissurellidae, the keyhole limpets and slit limpets.

== Description ==
The size of the shell varies between 14 mm and 27 mm, rarely exceeding 25 mm in length. Shape of the shell is broadly oval, with both ends raised and lateral slopes slightly convex, while the posterior and short anterior are straight or slightly concave. The shell has approximately 55 radiating rounded ribs that widen towards the margin and are separated by grooves. Color is described as pale straw or white with variable red rays.

== Distribution ==
This species is endemic to the Atlantic Ocean off North Carolina, USA and the Bahamas; off Antigua.
