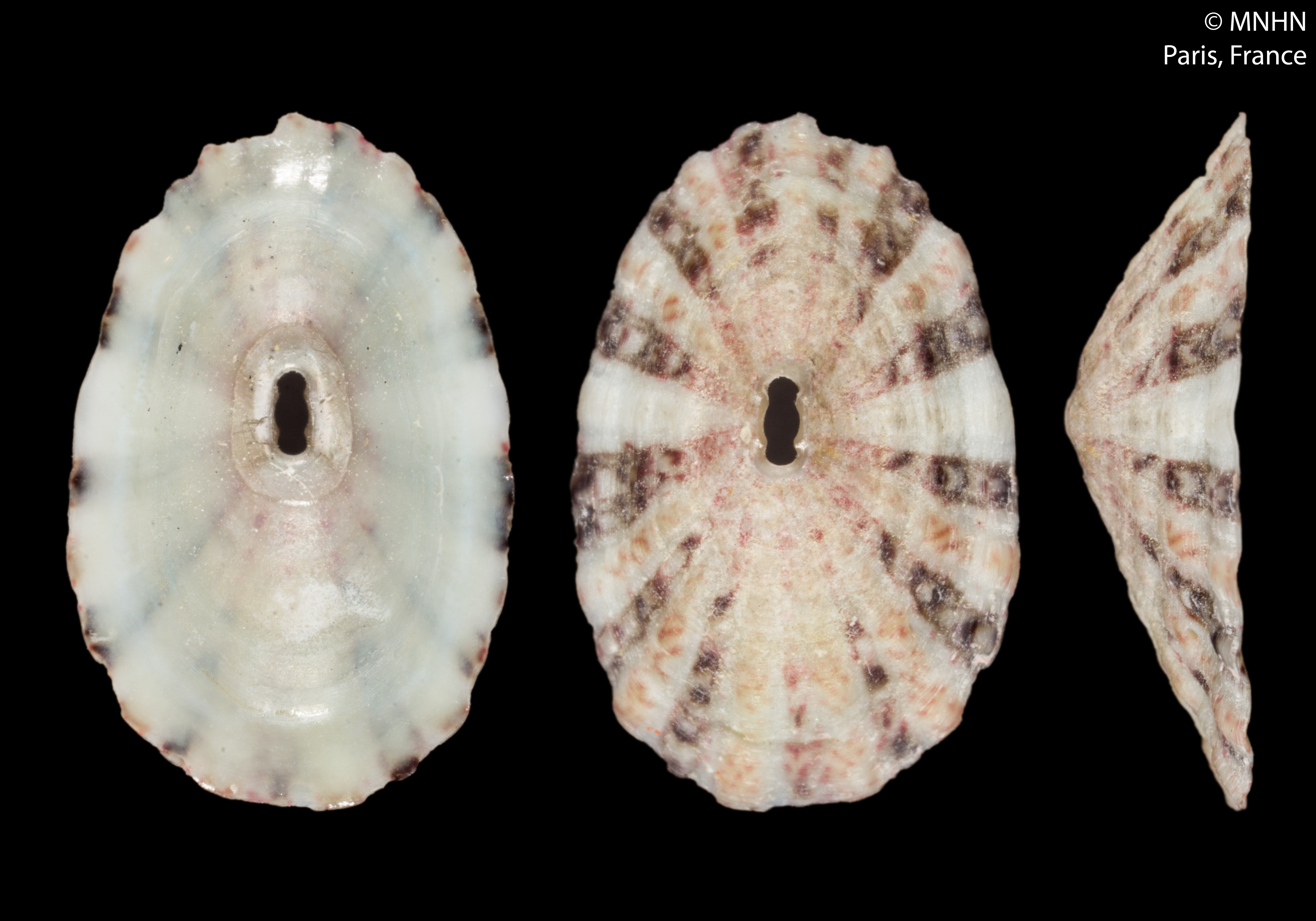
- Shell of Fissurella fischeri (holotype at MNHN, Paris)

Scientific classification
- Kingdom: Animalia
- Phylum: Mollusca
- Class: Gastropoda
- Subclass: Vetigastropoda
- Order: Lepetellida
- Family: Fissurellidae
- Genus: Fissurella
- Species: F. fischeri

Binomial name
- Fissurella fischeri F. Salvat, 1967

= Fissurella fischeri =

Species of gastropod

Fissurella fischeri is a species of sea snail, a marine gastropod mollusk in the family Fissurellidae, the keyhole limpets.

== Description ==
The size of the shell attains 9.5 mm.

== Distribution ==
This marine species occurs off the Cape Verdes.
