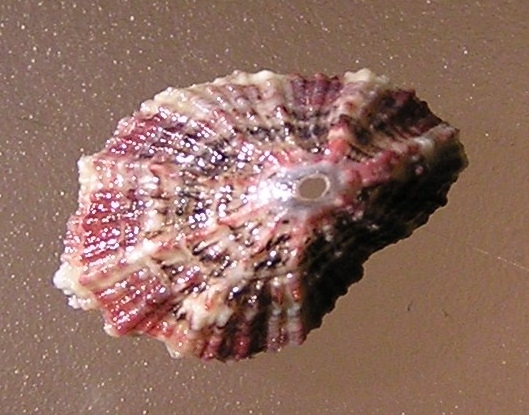
- Top view of a shell of Fissurella macrotrema

Scientific classification
- Kingdom: Animalia
- Phylum: Mollusca
- Class: Gastropoda
- Subclass: Vetigastropoda
- Order: Lepetellida
- Family: Fissurellidae
- Subfamily: Fissurellinae
- Genus: Fissurella
- Species: F. macrotrema

Binomial name
- Fissurella macrotrema Sowerby I, 1834

Synonyms
- Fissurella (Cremides) macrotrema Sowerby I, 1834

= Fissurella macrotrema =

Species of gastropod

Fissurella macrotrema is a species of sea snail, a marine gastropod mollusk in the family Fissurellidae, the keyhole limpets and slit limpets.

== Description ==
The length of the shell reaches 35 mm.

== Distribution ==
This species occurs in the Pacific Ocean off tropical West America; not off the Galapagos Islands.
