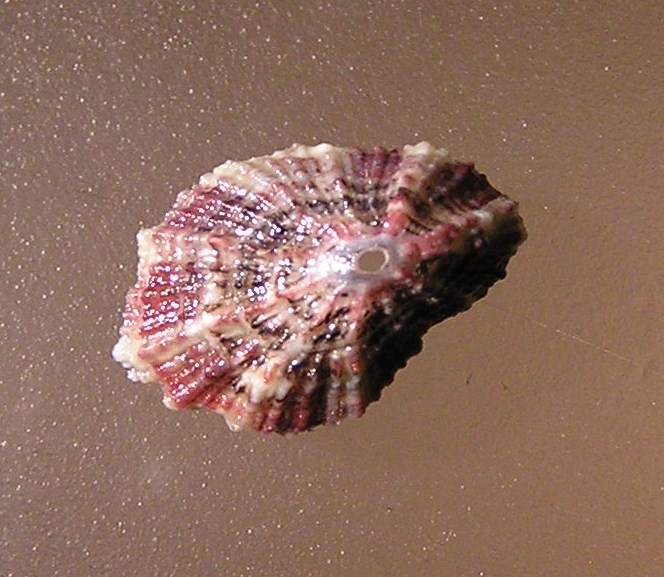
- Top view of a shell of Fissurella virescens

Scientific classification
- Kingdom: Animalia
- Phylum: Mollusca
- Class: Gastropoda
- Subclass: Vetigastropoda
- Order: Lepetellida
- Family: Fissurellidae
- Subfamily: Fissurellinae
- Genus: Fissurella
- Species: F. virescens

Binomial name
- Fissurella virescens Sowerby I, 1835

Synonyms
- Fissurella (Cremides) virescens Sowerby I, 1835; Fissurella nigropunctata Sowerby I, 1835; Megatebennus cokeri Dall, 1909

= Fissurella virescens =

Species of gastropod

Fissurella virescens, also known as the green Panama keyhole limpet, is a species of sea snail, a marine gastropod mollusk in the family Fissurellidae, the keyhole limpets and slit limpets.

== Description ==
The size of the shell differs between 12 mm and 30 mm.

== Distribution ==
This species occurs in the western Pacific Ocean from the Gulf of California to Peru; but not off the Galápagos Islands.
