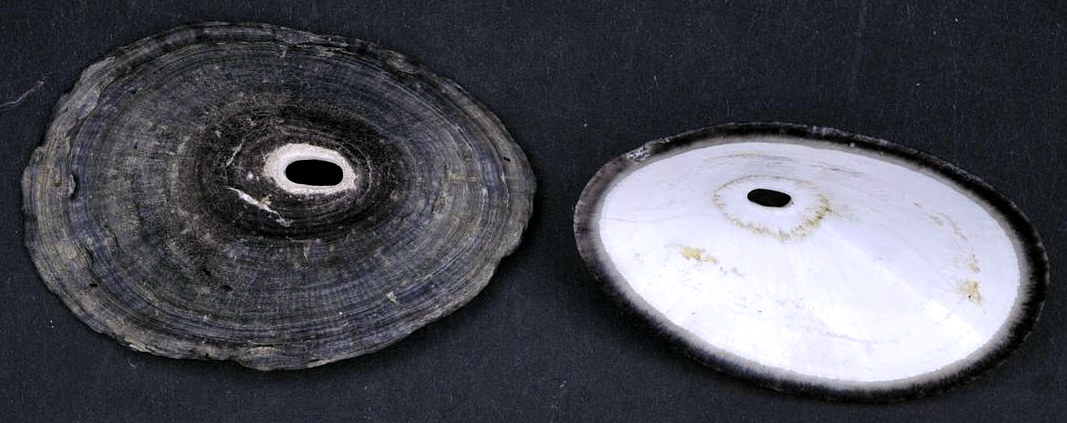
- Two views of a shell of Fissurella nigra (museum specimens at Naturalis Biodiversity Center)

Scientific classification
- Kingdom: Animalia
- Phylum: Mollusca
- Class: Gastropoda
- Subclass: Vetigastropoda
- Order: Lepetellida
- Family: Fissurellidae
- Subfamily: Fissurellinae
- Genus: Fissurella
- Species: F. nigra

Binomial name
- Fissurella nigra Lesson, 1831

Synonyms
- Fissurella grandis Sowerby I, 1835; Fissurella violacea Rathke, 1833

= Fissurella nigra =

Species of gastropod

Fissurella nigra, commonly called the black keyhole limpet, is a species of sea snail, a marine gastropod mollusk in the family Fissurellidae.

== Description ==
The size of the shell varies between 45mm and 115mm. The shell is conically shaped. At the apex of the shell, there is a small hole, often called the keyhole. The color is usually dark, such as black, reddish, or brown, and the ribs are often rough.

== Distribution ==
This marine species is found from Peru to the Strait of Magellan, excluding the Galápagos Islands.
