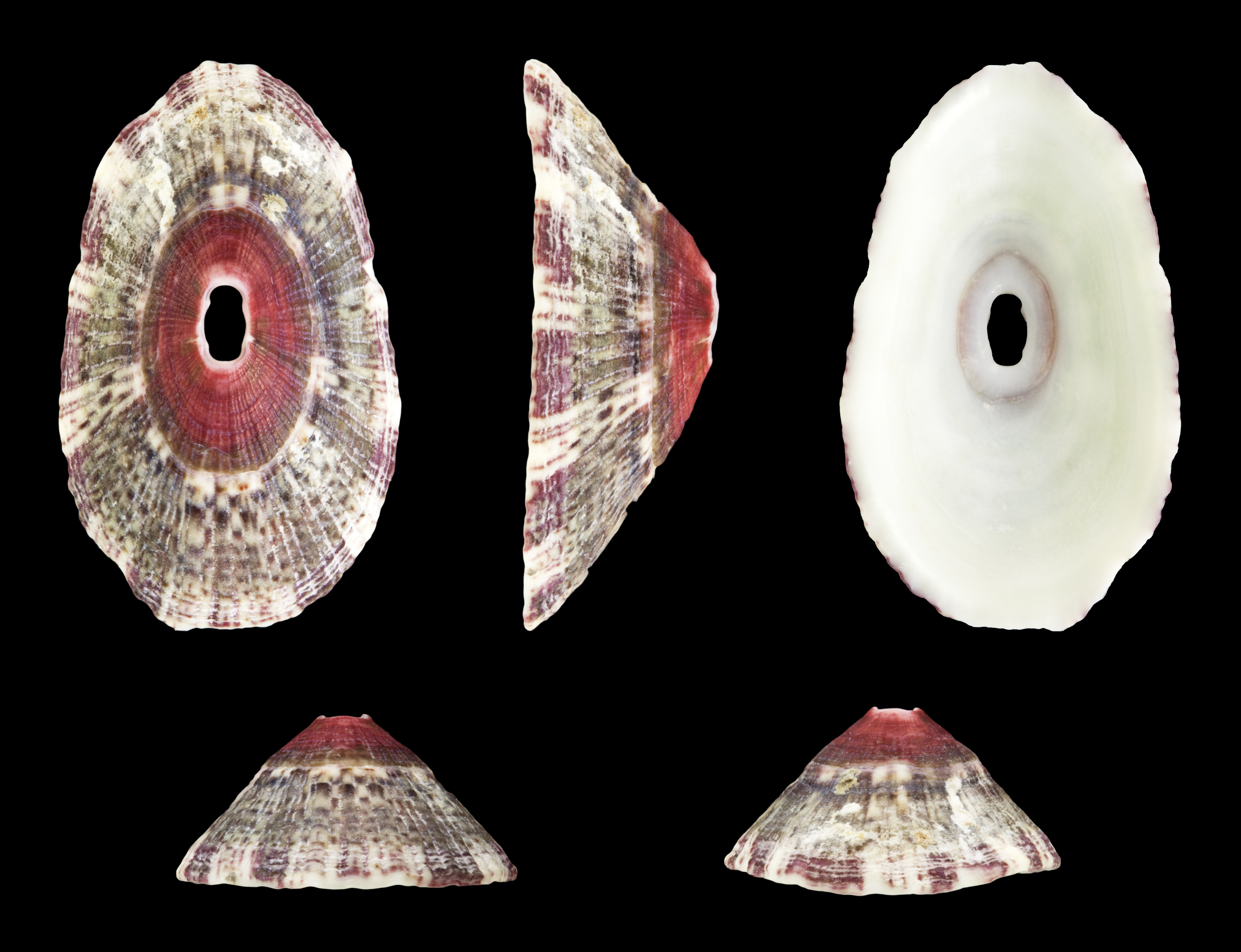

Scientific classification
- Kingdom: Animalia
- Phylum: Mollusca
- Class: Gastropoda
- Subclass: Vetigastropoda
- Order: Lepetellida
- Family: Fissurellidae
- Genus: Fissurella
- Species: F. nubecula

Binomial name
- Fissurella nubecula (Linnaeus, 1758)

Synonyms
- Fissurella cinnabrina Costa O.G., 1839; Fissurella lilacina Costa O.G., 1839; Fissurella mondelloensis de Gregorio, 1885; Fissurella nubecula var. elliptica Pallary, 1900; Fissurella philippii Requien, 1848; Fissurella viridis Costa O.G., 1839; Patella nubecula Linnaeus, 17588; Patella rosea Gmelin, 1791

= Fissurella nubecula =

Species of gastropod

Fissurella nubecula, common name the cloudy keyhole limpet, is a species of sea snail, a marine gastropod mollusk in the family Fissurellidae, the keyhole limpets.

== Description ==
The size of the shell varies between 10 mm and 25 mm.

== Distribution ==
This species occurs in the Mediterranean Sea, in the Atlantic Ocean off the Canary Islands, West Africa and Angola.
