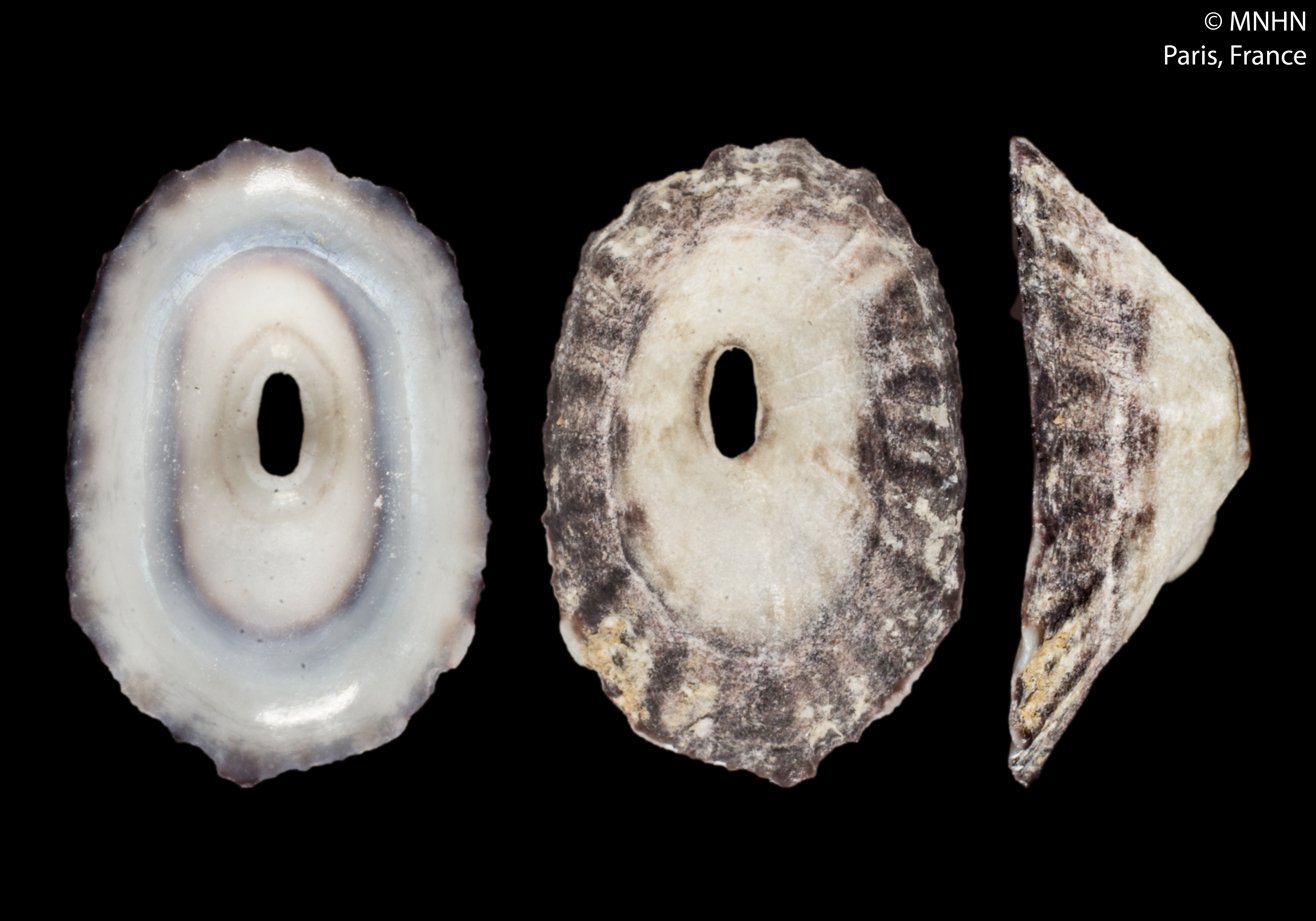
- Shell of Fissurella gaillardi (holotype at MNHN, Paris)

Scientific classification
- Kingdom: Animalia
- Phylum: Mollusca
- Class: Gastropoda
- Subclass: Vetigastropoda
- Order: Lepetellida
- Family: Fissurellidae
- Genus: Fissurella
- Species: F. gaillardi

Binomial name
- Fissurella gaillardi F. Salvat, 1967

= Fissurella gaillardi =

Species of gastropod

Fissurella gaillardi is a species of sea snail, a marine gastropod mollusk in the family Fissurellidae, the keyhole limpets. It occurs in Cape Verde.

Their habitat is mostly Cape Verde.

== Description ==
The size of the shell attains a size between 7-30 mm.

== Distribution ==
This marine species occurs off the Cape Verdes.
