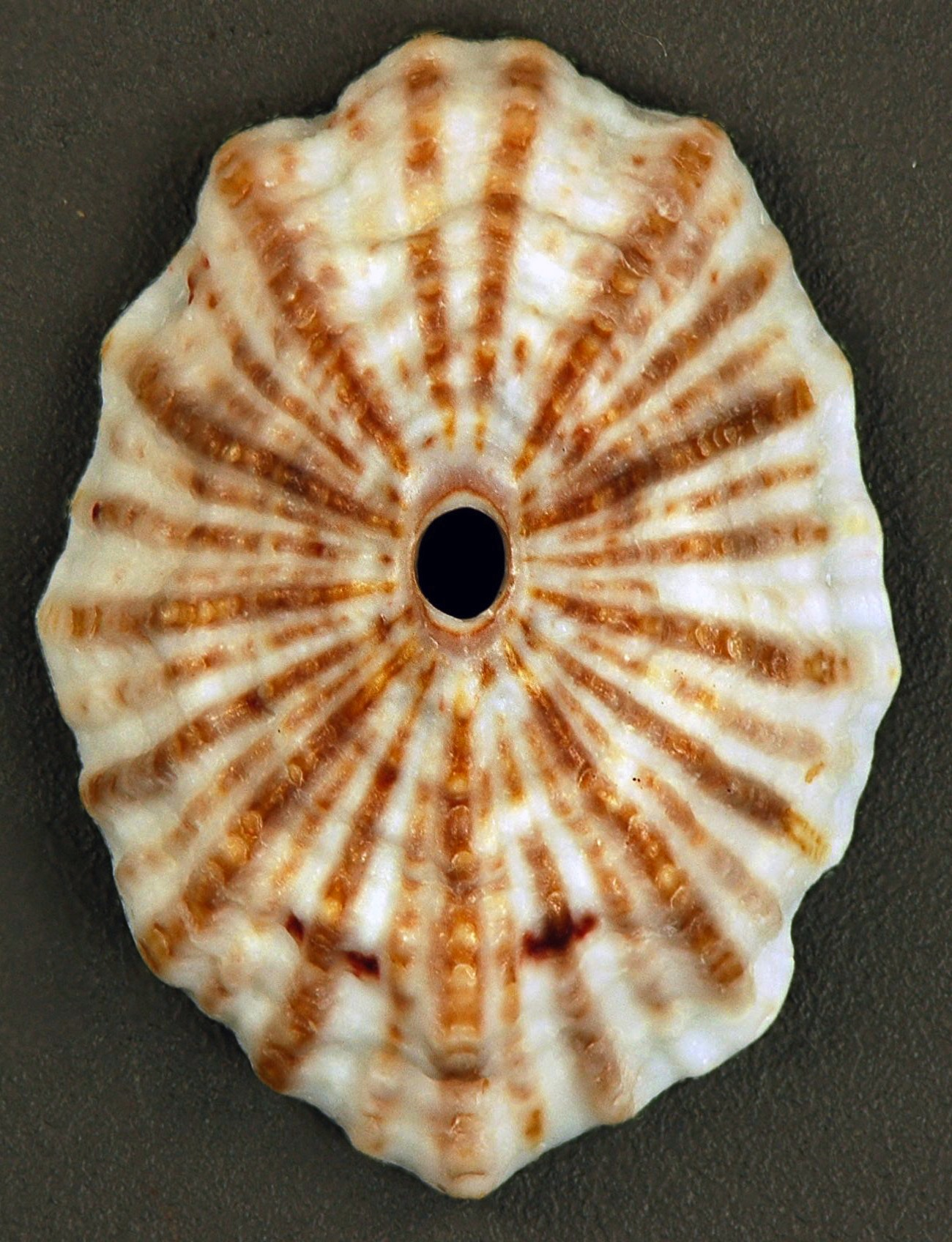
- Fissurella barbadensis shell

Scientific classification
- Kingdom: Animalia
- Phylum: Mollusca
- Class: Gastropoda
- Subclass: Vetigastropoda
- Order: Lepetellida
- Family: Fissurellidae
- Genus: Fissurella
- Species: F. barbadensis

Binomial name
- Fissurella barbadensis (Gmelin, 1791)

Synonyms
- Fissurella (Cremides) barbadensis (Gmelin, 1791)

= Fissurella barbadensis =

Species of gastropod

Fissurella barbadensis is a species of limpet in family Fissurellidae, the keyhole limpets. It is known commonly as the Barbados keyhole limpet and the rugose slit limpet. This species is native to the western Atlantic Ocean, including many islands of the Caribbean.

This limpet is up to 41 millimeters long. It is generally elliptical in shape. It has irregular ribbing on its shell and an irregular margin. It is gray to pinkish white with purple spots and lines. The internal surface has green and white concentric banding. The "keyhole" at the top of the shell has a green coloration internally.

This species lives in the rocky intertidal zone, sometimes in coral reefs.
