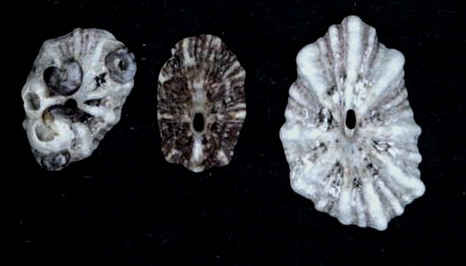
- Shells of Fissurella angusta (museum specimens at Naturalis Biodiversity Center)

Scientific classification
- Kingdom: Animalia
- Phylum: Mollusca
- Class: Gastropoda
- Subclass: Vetigastropoda
- Order: Lepetellida
- Family: Fissurellidae
- Genus: Fissurella
- Species: F. angusta

Binomial name
- Fissurella angusta (Gmelin, 1791)

= Fissurella angusta =

Species of gastropod

Fissurella angusta is a species of sea snail, a marine gastropod mollusk in the family Fissurellidae, the keyhole limpets.

== Distribution ==
This species occurs in the Caribbean Sea, the Gulf of Mexico, off the Lesser Antilles and Hispaniola.
