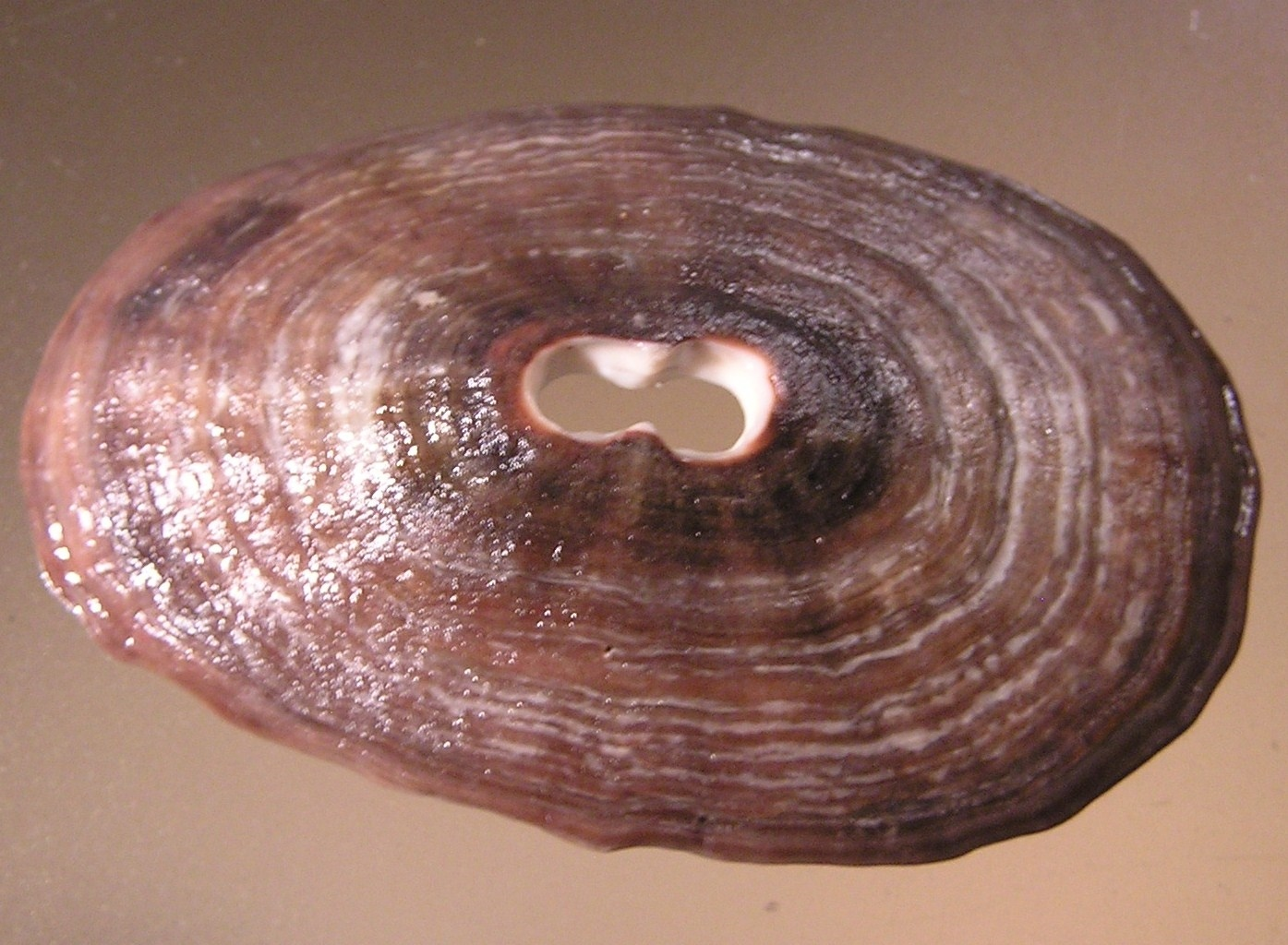
- Top view of a shell of Fissurella crassa

Scientific classification
- Kingdom: Animalia
- Phylum: Mollusca
- Class: Gastropoda
- Subclass: Vetigastropoda
- Order: Lepetellida
- Family: Fissurellidae
- Subfamily: Fissurellinae
- Genus: Fissurella
- Species: F. crassa

Binomial name
- Fissurella crassa Lamarck, 1822

Synonyms
- Fissurella clypeiformis Sowerby I, 1825; Fissurella depressa Lamarck, 1822

= Fissurella crassa =

Species of gastropod

Fissurella crassa, common name the thick keyhole limpet, is a species of sea snail, a marine gastropod mollusk in the family Fissurellidae, the keyhole limpets and slit limpets.

== Description ==
The size of the shell varies between 34 mm and 90 mm.

== Distribution ==
This species occurs in the Central Pacific to Peru and Chile; but not off the Galápagos Islands.
