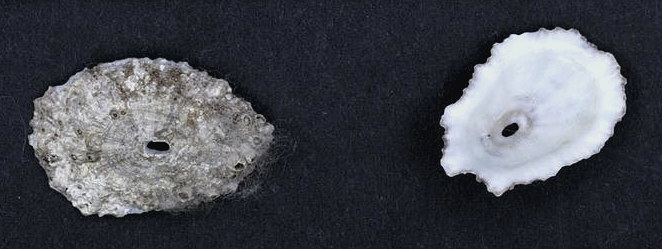
- Top view and basal view of a shell of Fissurella microtrema (museum specimens at Naturalis Biodiversity Center)

Scientific classification
- Kingdom: Animalia
- Phylum: Mollusca
- Class: Gastropoda
- Subclass: Vetigastropoda
- Order: Lepetellida
- Family: Fissurellidae
- Subfamily: Fissurellinae
- Genus: Fissurella
- Species: F. microtrema

Binomial name
- Fissurella microtrema Sowerby I, 1835

= Fissurella microtrema =

Species of gastropod

Fissurella microtrema, common name the rugose slit limpet, is a species of sea snail, a marine gastropod mollusk in the family Fissurellidae, the keyhole limpets and slit limpets.

== Description ==
The size of the shell varies between 15 mm and 27 mm.

== Distribution ==
This species occurs in the Pacific Ocean from Southern Baja California, Mexico, to Peru.
