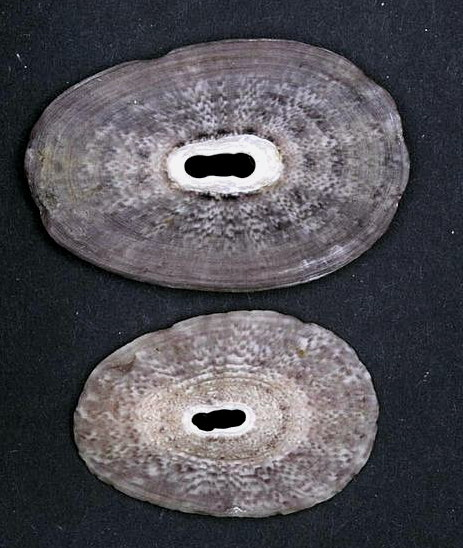
- Two shells of Fissurella pulchra (museum specimens at Naturalis Biodiversity Center)

Scientific classification
- Kingdom: Animalia
- Phylum: Mollusca
- Class: Gastropoda
- Subclass: Vetigastropoda
- Order: Lepetellida
- Family: Fissurellidae
- Subfamily: Fissurellinae
- Genus: Fissurella
- Species: F. pulchra

Binomial name
- Fissurella pulchra Sowerby I, 1834

= Fissurella pulchra =

Species of gastropod

Fissurella pulchra is a species of sea snail, a marine gastropod mollusk in the family Fissurellidae, the keyhole limpets and slit limpets.

== Description ==
The size of the shell attains 70 mm.

== Distribution ==
This marine species occurs off Chile.
