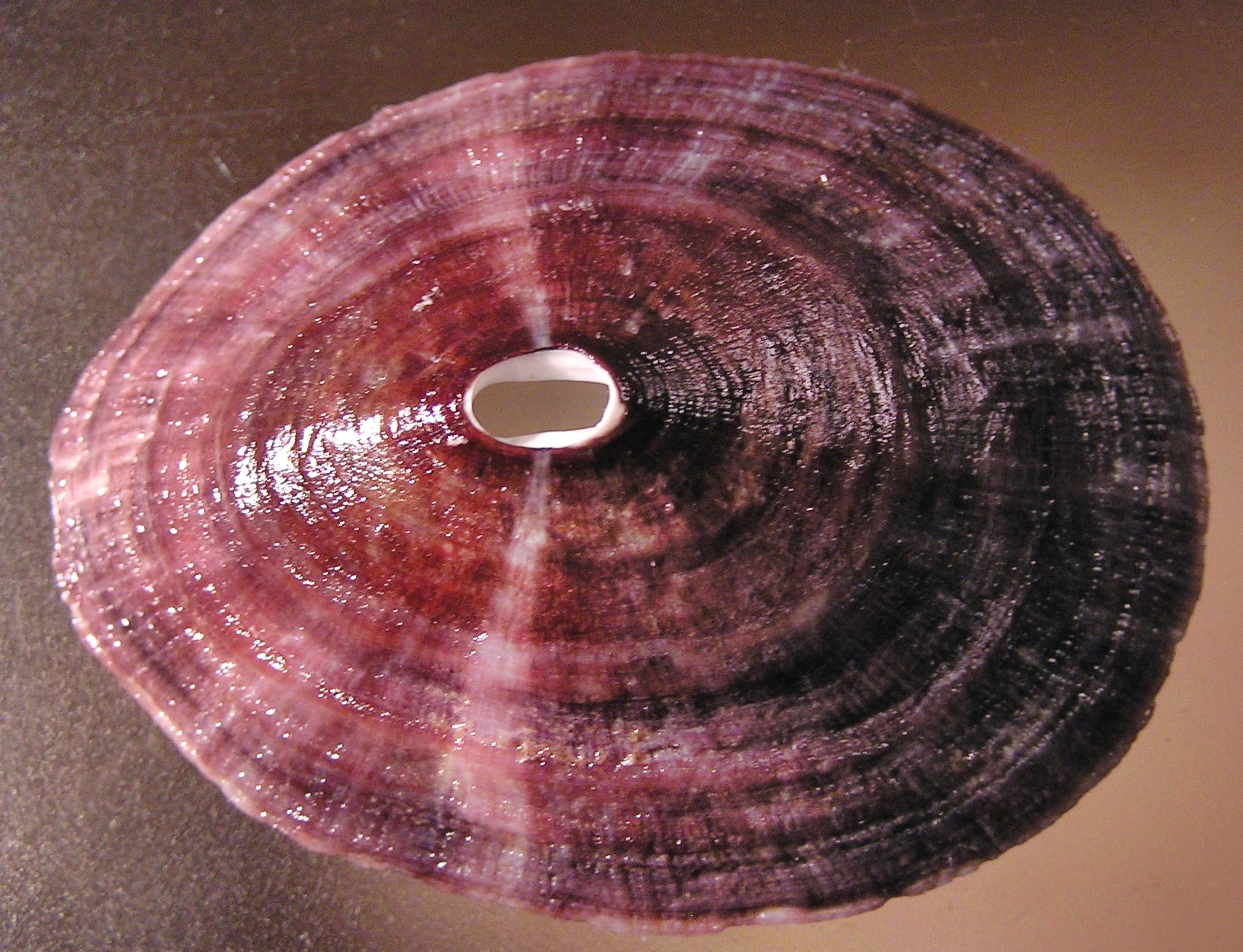

Scientific classification
- Kingdom: Animalia
- Phylum: Mollusca
- Class: Gastropoda
- Subclass: Vetigastropoda
- Order: Lepetellida
- Family: Fissurellidae
- Genus: Fissurella
- Species: F. latimarginata

Binomial name
- Fissurella latimarginata Sowerby I, 1835

Synonyms
- Fissurella bella Reeve, 1849; Fissurella biradiata Sowerby I, 1835; Fissurella galericulum Reeve, 1850; Fissurella punctatissima Pilsbry, 1890

= Fissurella latimarginata =

Species of gastropod

Fissurella latimarginata is a species of sea snail, a marine gastropod mollusk in the family Fissurellidae, the keyhole limpets.

== Description ==
The size of an adult shell varies between 50 mm and 100 mm.

== Distribution ==
This species occurs in the Pacific Ocean off Peru and Chile.
