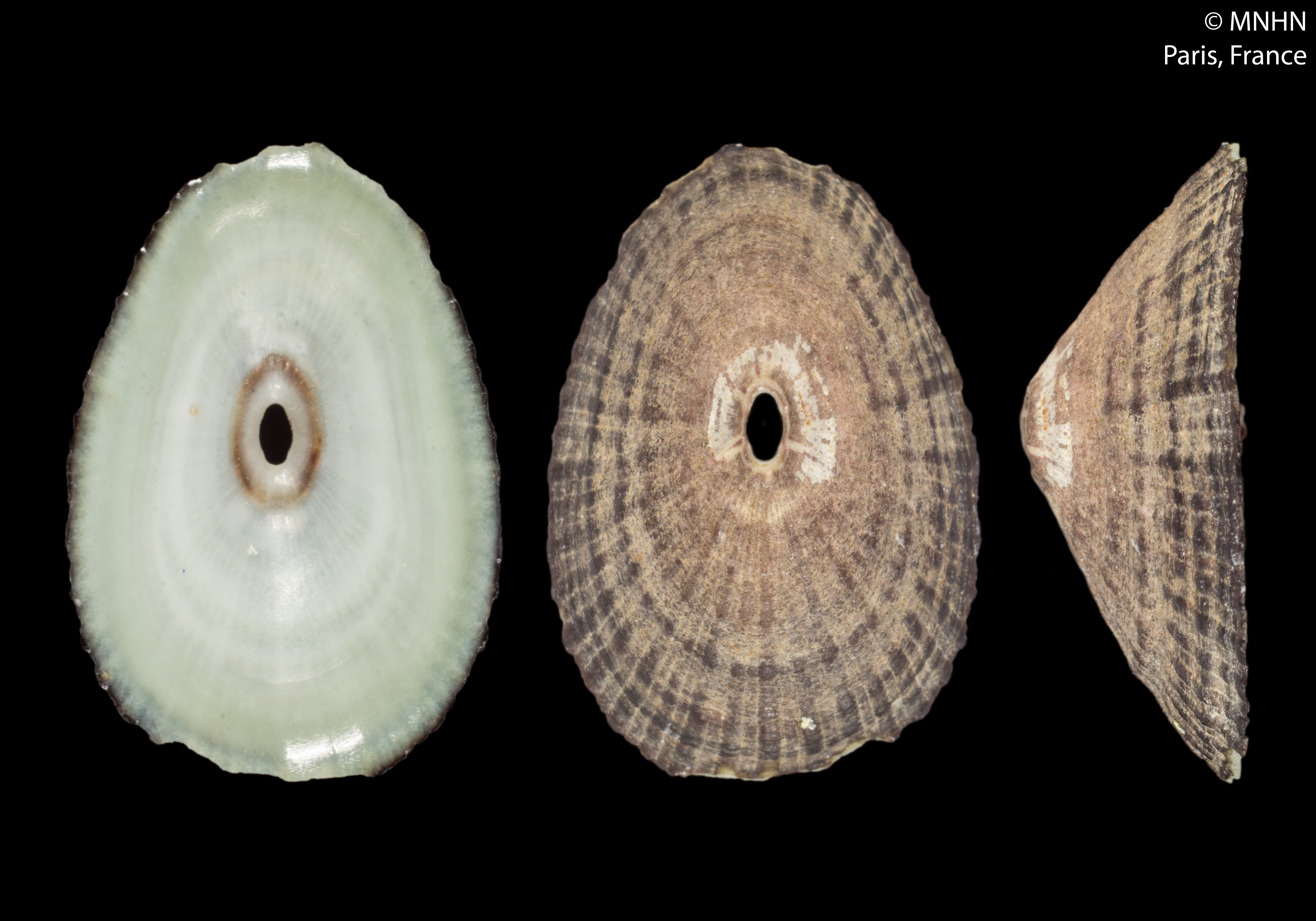
- Shell of Fissurella emmanuelae (paratype at MNHN, Paris)

Scientific classification
- Kingdom: Animalia
- Phylum: Mollusca
- Class: Gastropoda
- Subclass: Vetigastropoda
- Order: Lepetellida
- Family: Fissurellidae
- Subfamily: Fissurellinae
- Genus: Fissurella
- Species: F. emmanuelae

Binomial name
- Fissurella emmanuelae Métivier, 1970

= Fissurella emmanuelae =

Species of gastropod

Fissurella emmanuelae is a species of sea snail, a marine gastropod mollusk in the family Fissurellidae, the keyhole limpets and slit limpets.

== Distribution ==
This species occurs in the Atlantic Ocean off Brazil.
