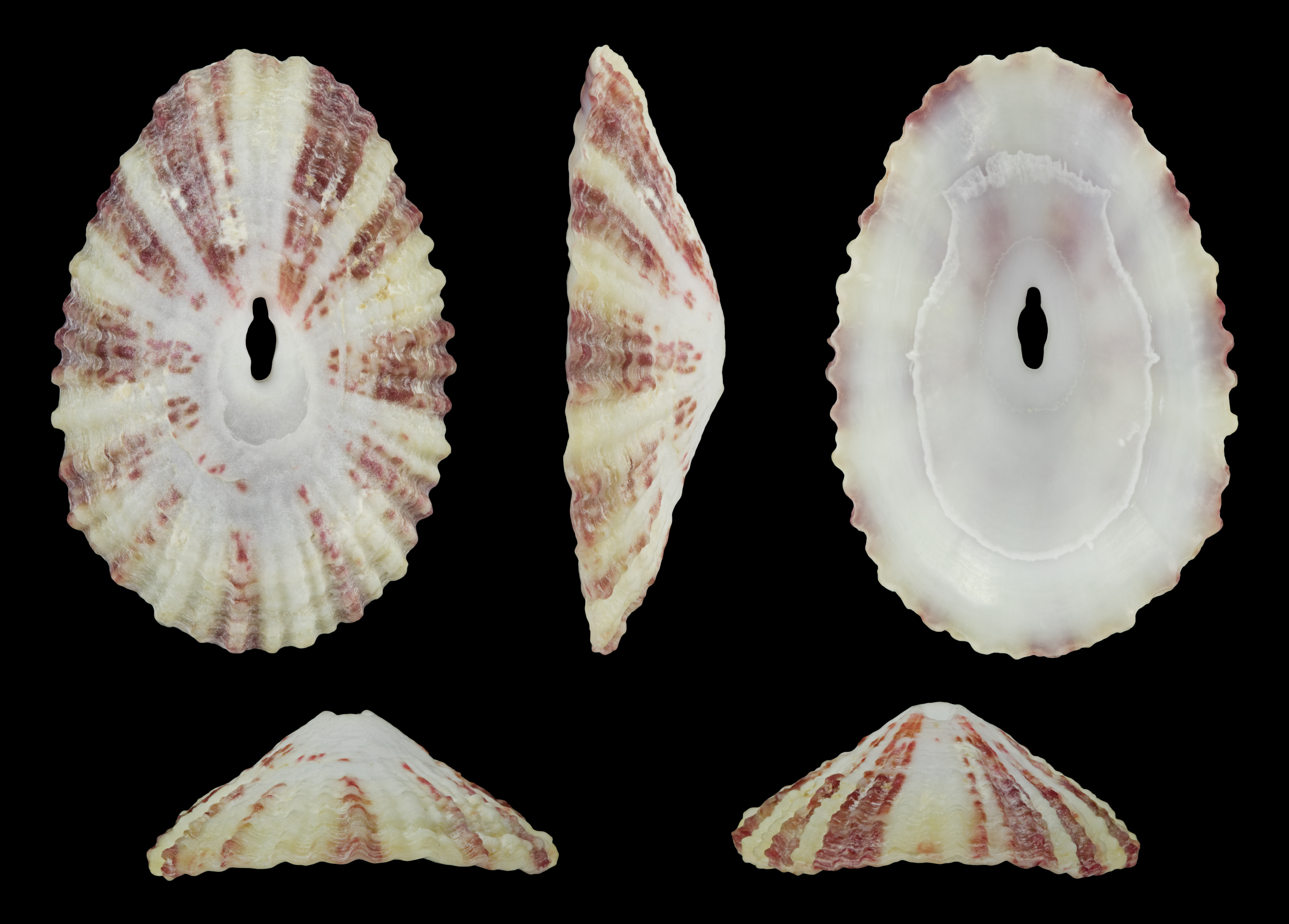

Scientific classification
- Kingdom: Animalia
- Phylum: Mollusca
- Class: Gastropoda
- Subclass: Vetigastropoda
- Order: Lepetellida
- Family: Fissurellidae
- Genus: Fissurella
- Species: F. fascicularis

Binomial name
- Fissurella fascicularis Lamarck, 1822

Synonyms
- Fissurella (Clypidella) fascicularis Lamarck, 1822

= Fissurella fascicularis =

Species of gastropod

Fissurella fascicularis, common name the wobbly keyhole limpet, is a species of sea snail, a marine gastropod mollusk in the family Fissurellidae, the keyhole limpets.

== Description ==
The size of the shell varies between 14 mm and 32 mm.

(Original description in Latin) The shell is quite small, oblong-elliptic in shape, and somewhat depressed. It is yellowish-white in color and is decorated with radiated, brownish, bundled lines.

The surface is marked by crowded striae, and the elongated foramen is strikingly encircled by a red line.

== Distribution ==
This marine species occurs in the Gulf of Mexico, the Caribbean Sea and off the Lesser Antilles.

== Bibliography ==
- Rosenberg, G.; Moretzsohn, F.; García, E. F. (2009). Gastropoda (Mollusca) of the Gulf of Mexico, Pp. 579–699 in: Felder, D.L. and D.K. Camp (eds.), Gulf of Mexico–Origins, Waters, and Biota. Texas A&M Press, College Station, Texas.
- Turgeon, D., Quinn, J. F., Bogan, A. E., Coan, E. V., Hochberg, F. G., Lyons, W. G., Mikkelsen, P. M., Neves, R. J., Roper, C. F. E., Rosenberg, G., Roth, B., Scheltema, A., Thompson, F. G., Vecchione, M., Williams, J. D. (1998). Common and scientific names of aquatic invertebrates from the United States and Canada: mollusks. 2nd ed. American Fisheries Society Special Publication, 26. American Fisheries Society: Bethesda, MD (USA). ISBN 1-888569-01-8. IX, 526 + cd-rom pp.
