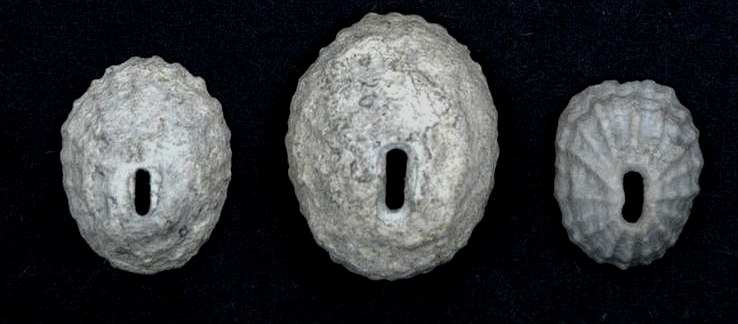
- Shells of Fissurella alabastrites (museum specimens at Naturalis Biodiversity Center)

Scientific classification
- Kingdom: Animalia
- Phylum: Mollusca
- Class: Gastropoda
- Subclass: Vetigastropoda
- Order: Lepetellida
- Family: Fissurellidae
- Genus: Fissurella
- Species: F. alabastrites

Binomial name
- Fissurella alabastrites Reeve, 1849

Synonyms
- Fissurella (Cremides) nimbosa Thiele, 1891 (homonym of Fissurella nimbosa (Linnaeus, 1758) ); Fissurella keppeliana Sowerby III, 1911

= Fissurella alabastrites =

Species of gastropod

Fissurella alabastrites is a species of sea snail, a marine gastropod mollusk in the family Fissurellidae, the keyhole limpets.

== Distribution ==
Fissurella alabastrites is found in the waters around Cape Verde and Sierra Leone.

== Description ==
The length of the shell varies between 12 mm and 44 mm.
