= Fissurella mesoatlantica =

Scientific classification
- Kingdom: Animalia
- Phylum: Mollusca
- Class: Gastropoda
- Subclass: Vetigastropoda
- Order: Lepetellida
- Family: Fissurellidae
- Genus: Fissurella
- Species: F. mesoatlantica

Binomial name
- Fissurella mesoatlantica Simone, 2008

Species of gastropod

Fissurella mesoatlantica is a species of sea snail, a marine gastropod mollusk in the family Fissurellidae, the keyhole limpets.
