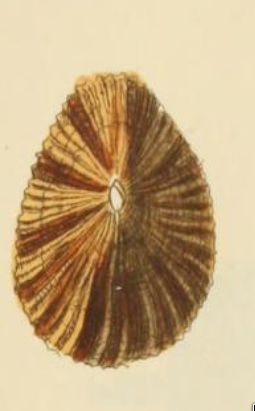
- Shell of Fissurella subrostrata

Scientific classification
- Kingdom: Animalia
- Phylum: Mollusca
- Class: Gastropoda
- Subclass: Vetigastropoda
- Order: Lepetellida
- Family: Fissurellidae
- Genus: Fissurella
- Species: F. subrostrata

Binomial name
- Fissurella subrostrata Gray in Sowerby I, 1835

= Fissurella subrostrata =

Species of gastropod

Fissurella subrostrata is a species of sea snail, a marine gastropod mollusk in the family Fissurellidae, the keyhole limpets.

== Description ==
The size of an adult shell reaches 30 mm.

== Distribution ==
This marine species is found along St Vincent, the West Indies.
