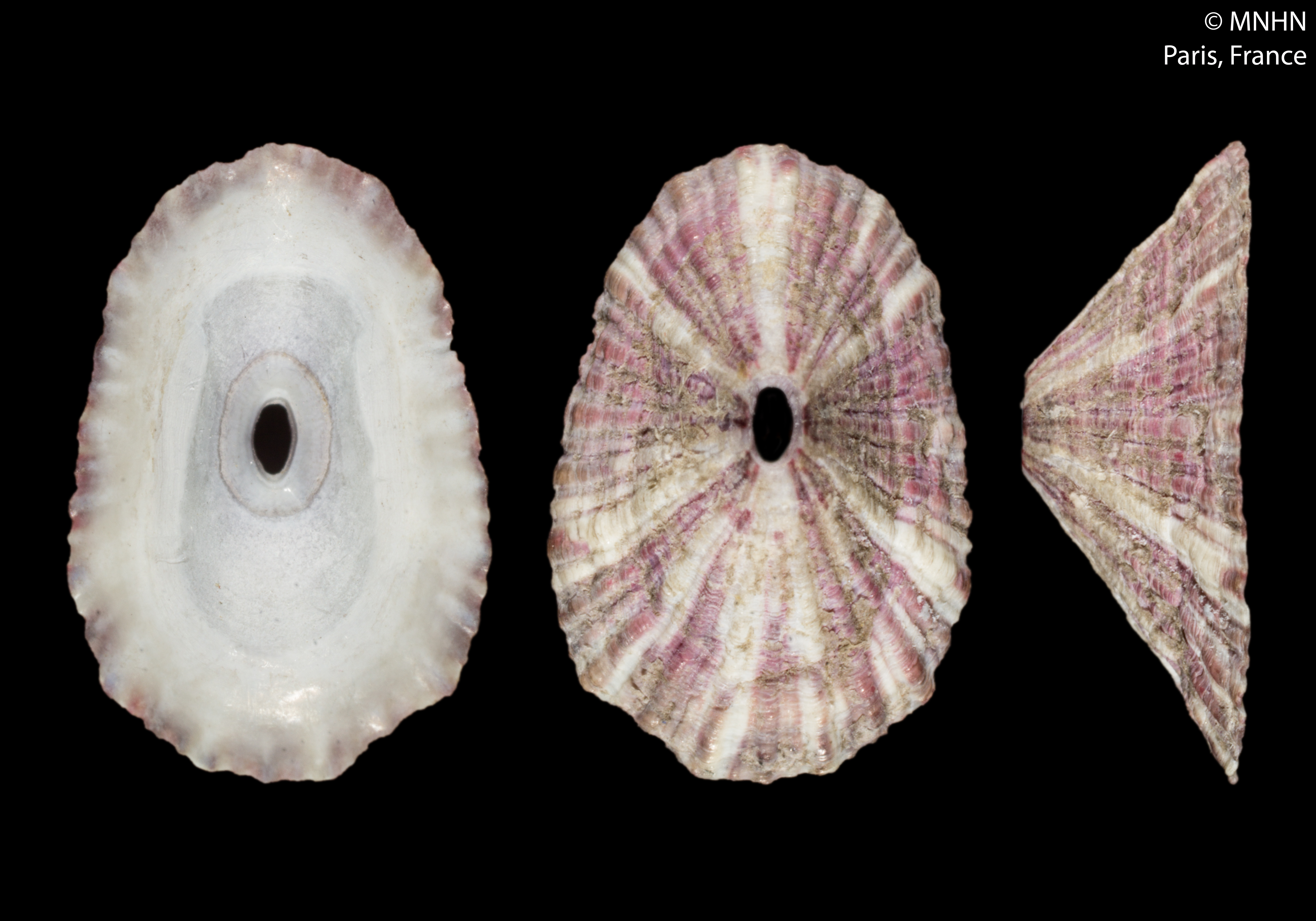
- Shell of Fissurella salvatiana (holotype at MNHN, Paris)

Scientific classification
- Kingdom: Animalia
- Phylum: Mollusca
- Class: Gastropoda
- Subclass: Vetigastropoda
- Order: Lepetellida
- Family: Fissurellidae
- Genus: Fissurella
- Species: F. salvatiana

Binomial name
- Fissurella salvatiana Christiaens, 1982

Synonyms
- Fissurella foresti F. Salvat, 1967 (invalid: junior homonym of Fissurella foresti Michaud, 1877; F. salvatiana is a replacement name)

= Fissurella salvatiana =

Species of gastropod

Fissurella salvatiana is a species of sea snail, a marine gastropod mollusk in the family Fissurellidae, the keyhole limpets.

== Description ==
The size of the shell attains 9 mm.

== Distribution ==
This marine species occurs off the Cape Verdes.
