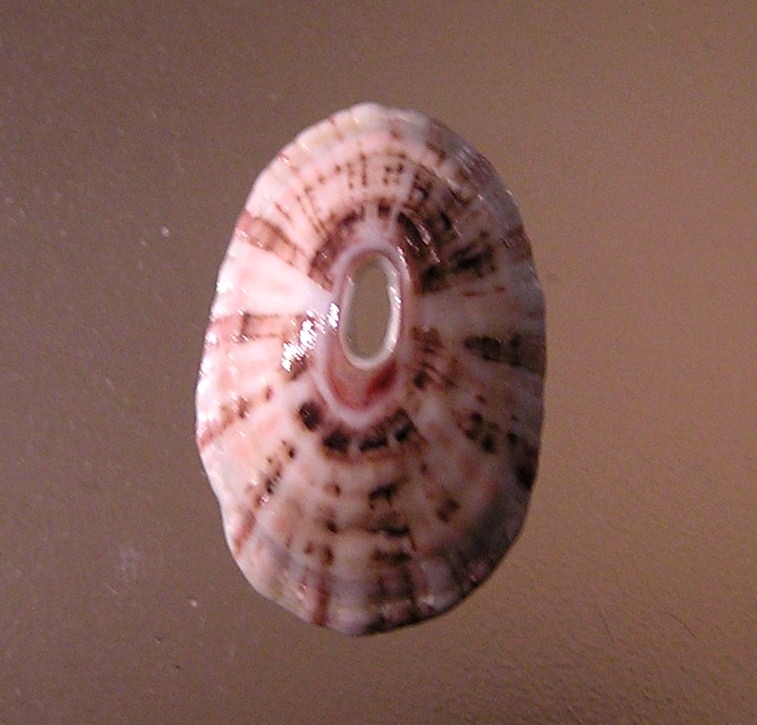
- Top view of a shell of Fissurella rubropicta

Scientific classification
- Kingdom: Animalia
- Phylum: Mollusca
- Class: Gastropoda
- Subclass: Vetigastropoda
- Order: Lepetellida
- Family: Fissurellidae
- Subfamily: Fissurellinae
- Genus: Fissurella
- Species: F. rubropicta

Binomial name
- Fissurella rubropicta Pilsbry, 1890

= Fissurella rubropicta =

Species of gastropod

Fissurella rubropicta is a species of sea snail, a marine gastropod mollusk in the family Fissurellidae, the keyhole limpets and slit limpets.

== Description ==
The size of the shell reaches 30 mm.

== Distribution ==
This species occurs in the Pacific Ocean off Mexico and Costa Rica.
