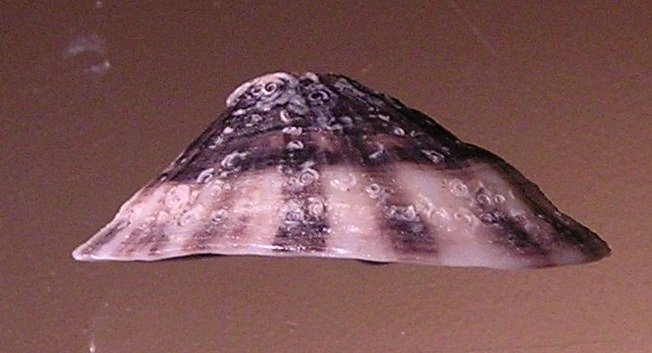
- Fissurella radiosa tixierae

Scientific classification
- Kingdom: Animalia
- Phylum: Mollusca
- Class: Gastropoda
- Subclass: Vetigastropoda
- Order: Lepetellida
- Family: Fissurellidae
- Genus: Fissurella
- Species: F. radiosa

Binomial name
- Fissurella radiosa Lesson, 1831

Synonyms
- Fissurella darwinii Reeve, 1849; Fissurella dozei Rochebrune & Mabille, 1885; Fissurella exquisita Reeve, 1850; Fissurella grisea Reeve, 1849; Fissurella nigra Philippi, 1845 (Invalid: junior homonym of Fissurella nigra Lesson, 1831; Fissurella philippii is a replacement name); Fissurella philippiana Reeve, 1850; Fissurella philippii Hupé, 1854; Fissurella polygona Sowerby II, 1862; Fissurella tixierae Métivier, 1969

= Fissurella radiosa =

Species of gastropod

Fissurella radiosa is a species of sea snail, a marine gastropod mollusk in the family Fissurellidae, the keyhole limpets.

Two subspecies :

- Fissurella radiosa radiosa Lesson, 1831 (represented as Fissurella radiosa Lesson, 1831)
- Fissurella radiosa tixierae Métivier, 1969

== Description ==
The size of an adult shell varies between 18 mm and 55 mm.

== Distribution ==
This species occurs in the Atlantic Ocean off the Falkland Islands and the Straits of Magellan of Argentina and Tierra del Fuego.

== Gallery ==
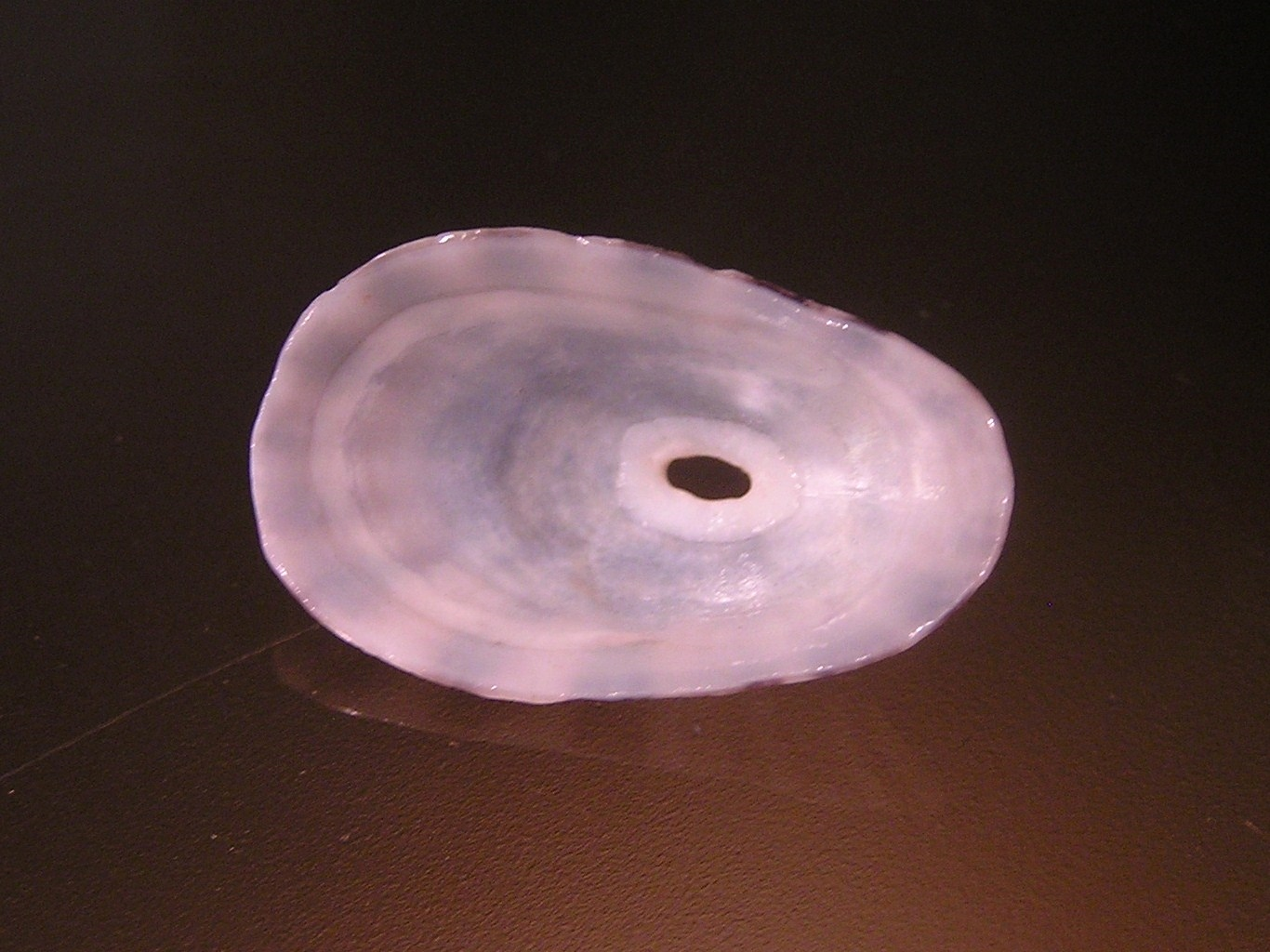
Fissurella radiosa tixierae The view of a specimen from below.

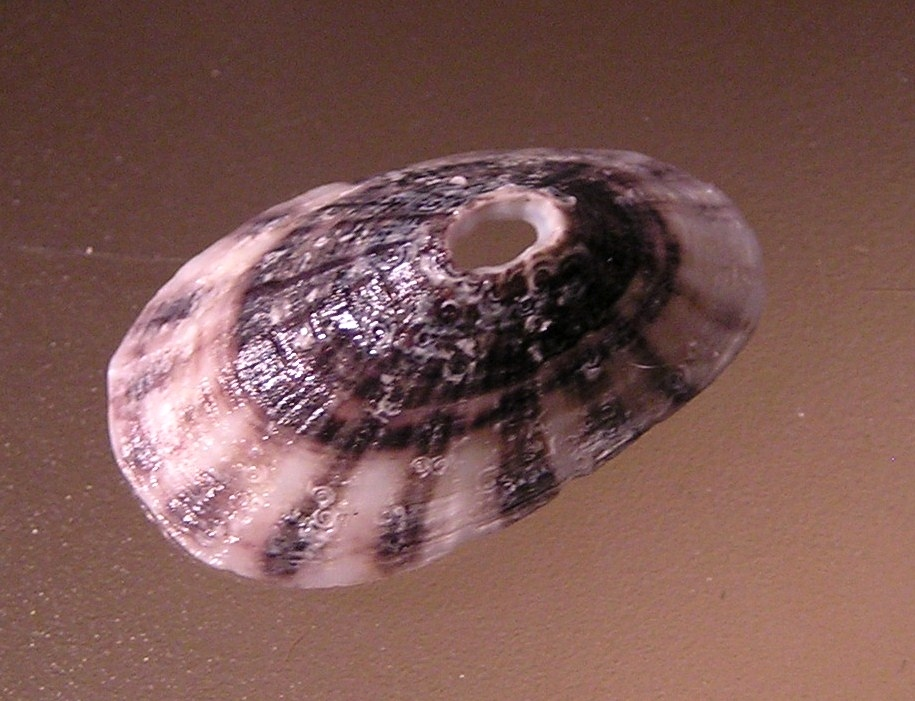
Fissurella radiosa tixierae The same specimen, with a view from the side.
