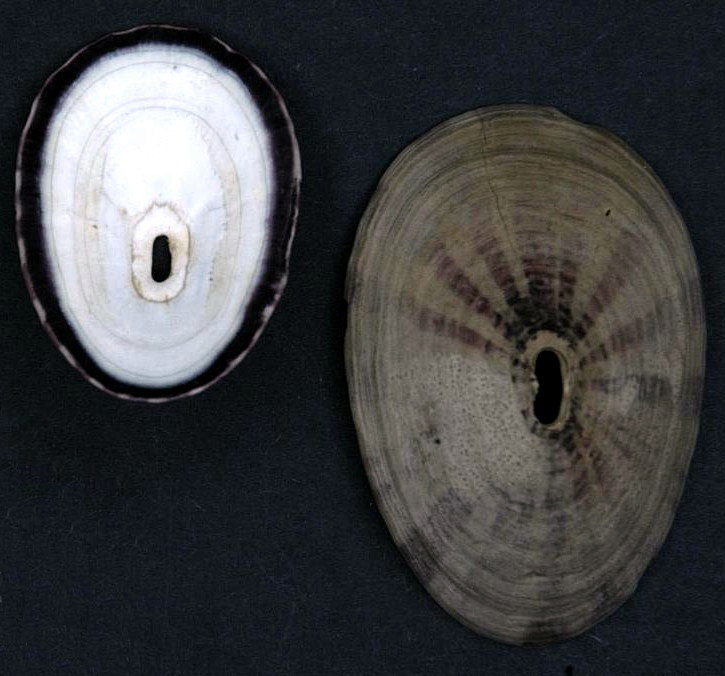
- Shell of Fissurella limbata (museum specimen at Naturalis Biodiversity Center)

Scientific classification
- Kingdom: Animalia
- Phylum: Mollusca
- Class: Gastropoda
- Subclass: Vetigastropoda
- Order: Lepetellida
- Family: Fissurellidae
- Subfamily: Fissurellinae
- Genus: Fissurella
- Species: F. limbata

Binomial name
- Fissurella limbata Sowerby I, 1835

Synonyms
- Fissurella limbata var. multilineata Ziegenhorn & Thiem, 1925

= Fissurella limbata =

Species of limpet from the Pacific

Fissurella limbata is a species of sea snail, a marine gastropod mollusk in the family Fissurellidae, the keyhole limpets and slit limpets.

== Distribution ==
This marine species occurs in the Pacific from Peru to the Strait of Magelhaen.

== Description ==
The size of the shell varies between 33 mm and 70 mm.
