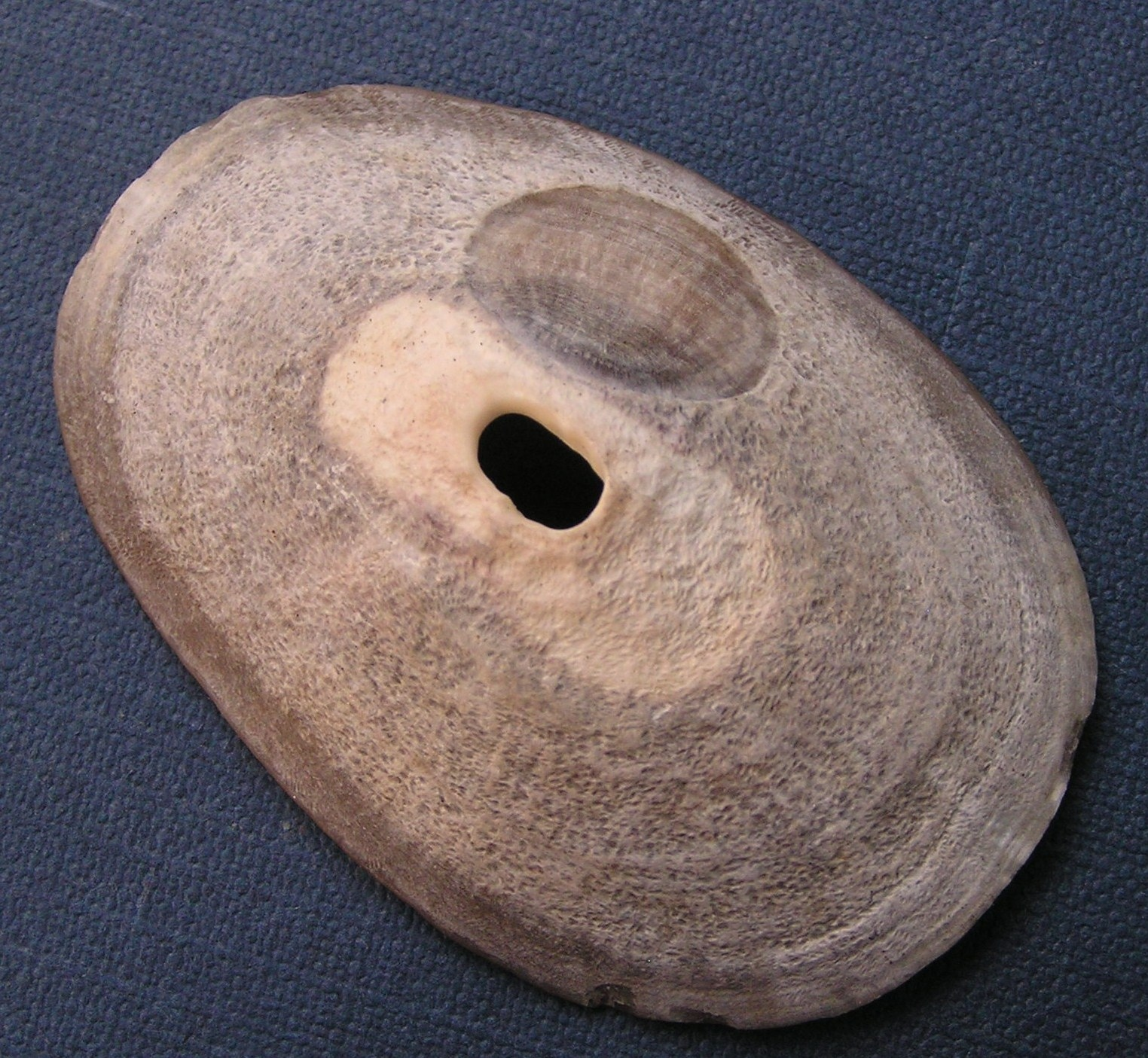
- Top view of a shell of Fissurella bridgesii

Scientific classification
- Kingdom: Animalia
- Phylum: Mollusca
- Class: Gastropoda
- Subclass: Vetigastropoda
- Order: Lepetellida
- Family: Fissurellidae
- Subfamily: Fissurellinae
- Genus: Fissurella
- Species: F. bridgesii

Binomial name
- Fissurella bridgesii Reeve, 1849

= Fissurella bridgesii =

Species of gastropod

Fissurella bridgesii is a species of sea snail, a marine gastropod mollusk in the family Fissurellidae, the keyhole limpets and slit limpets.

== Description ==
The size of the shell varies between 50 mm and 100 mm.

== Distribution ==
This species occurs in the Pacific Ocean from Peru to Central Chile.
