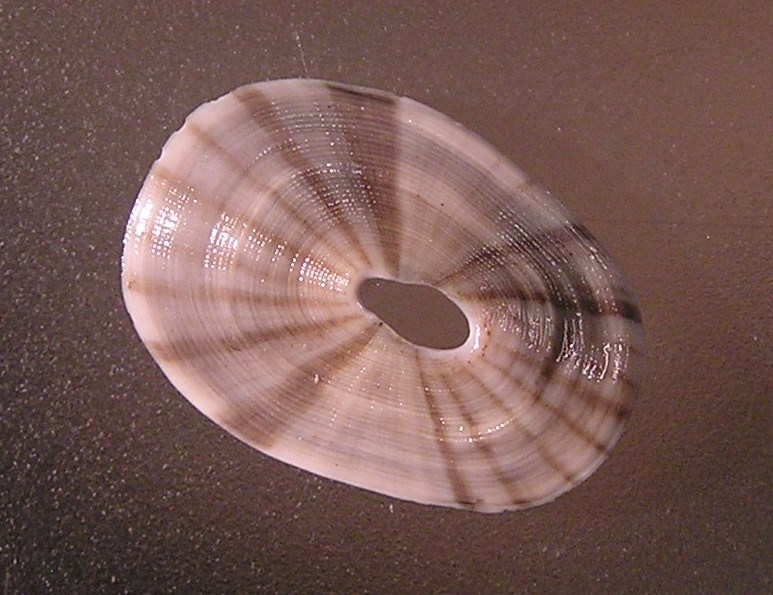

Scientific classification
- Kingdom: Animalia
- Phylum: Mollusca
- Class: Gastropoda
- Subclass: Vetigastropoda
- Order: Lepetellida
- Family: Fissurellidae
- Genus: Amblychilepas
- Species: A. javanicensis

Binomial name
- Amblychilepas javanicensis (Lamarck, 1822)

Synonyms
- Fissurella javanicensis Lamarck, 1822 (original combination ); Fissurella scutellum Gray, 1835; Fissurella tasmaniensis Bonnet, 1864 ·; Fissurella trapezina Sowerby I, 1835

= Amblychilepas javanicensis =

Species of gastropod

Amblychilepas javanicensis, commonly known as the rayed keyhole limpet, is a species of sea snail, a marine gastropod mollusk in the family Fissurellidae, the keyhole limpets.

== Description ==
The size of the shell varies between 20 mm and 31 mm.

Originally described in Latin as Fissurella trapezina, the shell has a somewhat trapezoidal shape with rounded angles, narrowing toward the front and appearing flattened, with slightly raised extremities. Internally, it is white, featuring a muscle impression set near the edge and a thickened margin. Externally, the surface is faintly grooved concentrically and displays a pale color with brown radiating streaks. The dorsal aperture is large and broad, widening toward the front.

== Distribution ==
This marine species is endemic to Australia and occurs off southern Queensland, Western Australia and off Tasmania, living in sand in open but sheltered waters in the subtidal zone from low water to depths of about 20 m.

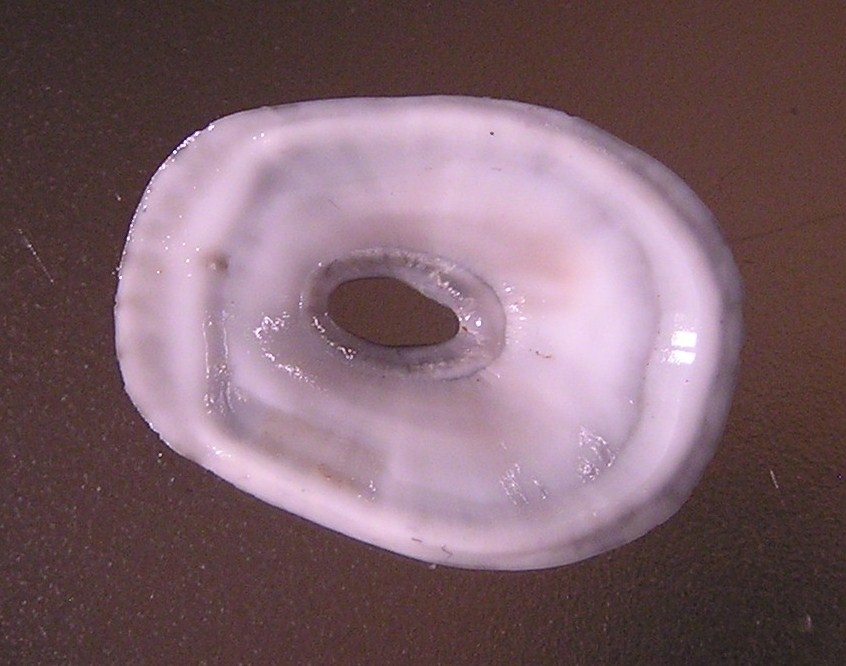
Basal view
