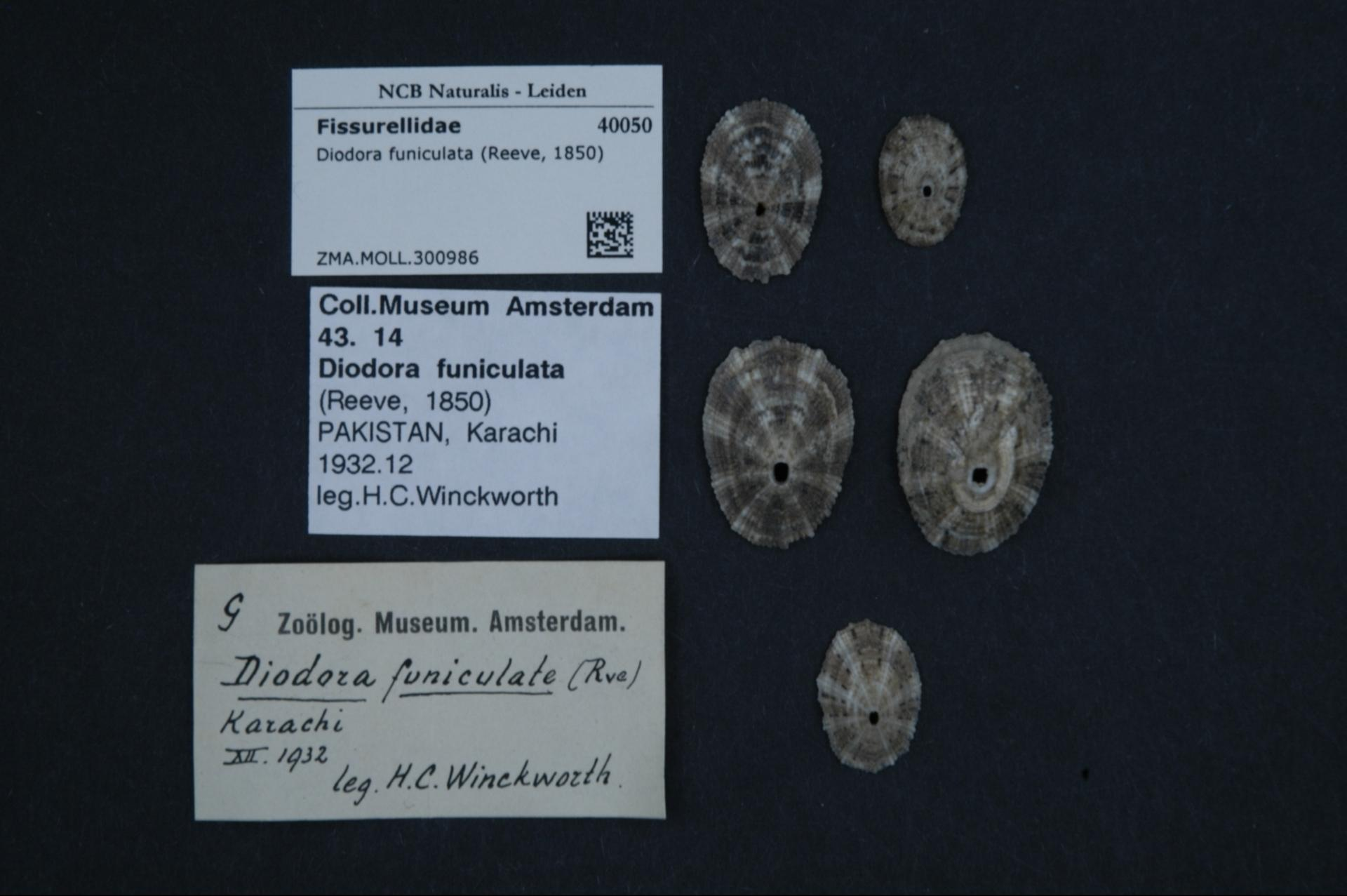

Scientific classification
- Kingdom: Animalia
- Phylum: Mollusca
- Class: Gastropoda
- Subclass: Vetigastropoda
- Order: Lepetellida
- Family: Fissurellidae
- Genus: Diodora
- Species: D. funiculata

Binomial name
- Diodora funiculata (Reeve, 1850)

Synonyms
- Fissurella funiculata Reeve, 1850

= Diodora funiculata =

Species of gastropod

Diodora funiculata is a species of sea snail, a marine gastropod mollusk in the family Fissurellidae, the keyhole limpets.

== Description ==
The Fissurellidae clan comprises a wide range of sea snails that are known as keyhole limpets or slit limpets. They are prevalent in rocky habitats in intertidal and subtidal zones in oceans worldwide. The unique feature of this family is their shells, which have a conical or oval shape with a keyhole appearance. This keyhole is created by a hole close to the top of the shell and a notch or slit near the base. Fissurellidae shells vary in texture and color, with some being smooth and others having sculptured ridges ranging from dull shades of gray or brown to bright, vibrant hues. These shells are crucial for shielding the gastropods from predators and giving them a secure surface to attach to rocky substrates. Fissurellids' feet are robust and muscular and serve as means for movement and feeding on algae and other plant matter on rocks and other surfaces. Fissurellids play a crucial role as herbivores in rocky intertidal ecosystems and are significant grazers. They have the ability to utilize their shells as a scraping tool to remove algae from surfaces. Additionally, they are ecologically valuable since they offer microhabitats for other organisms (such as sea anemones and barnacles) by providing shelter within their shells. Numerous types of Fissurellidae are gathered for human consumption in Latin America and Asia, but the excessive fishing practices and destruction of their habitats have resulted in a decrease in the number of some species. To safeguard the keyhole limpets, methods such as the creation of marine protected regions and the implementation of rules on harvesting wild populations are being employed as conservation initiatives. The Fissurellidae clan is a significant assemblage of sea snails that possess unique shells and serve crucial ecological and financial functions. Their shells, which have a hole in the center, offer them safety from predators and firm adhesion to rocky surfaces. Their grazing behavior and ability to generate microenvironments make them ecologically important, while their economic worth has resulted in attempts to conserve their populations.

== Distribution ==
This species occurs in the Red Sea and as an invasive species in the Mediterranean Sea.
