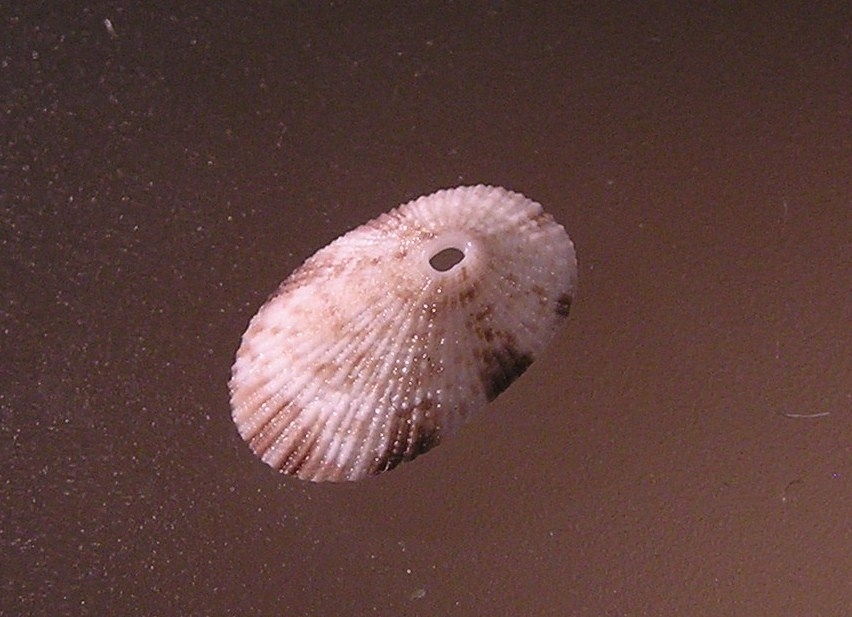

Scientific classification
- Kingdom: Animalia
- Phylum: Mollusca
- Class: Gastropoda
- Subclass: Vetigastropoda
- Order: Lepetellida
- Family: Fissurellidae
- Genus: Diodora
- Species: D. singaporensis

Binomial name
- Diodora singaporensis (Reeve, 1850)

Synonyms
- Diodora ovalis Thiele, 1930; Fissurella singaporensis Reeve, 1850 (basionym); Fissurella tenuistriata Sowerby, 1862; Fissurella townsendi Melvill, 1897

= Diodora singaporensis =

Species of gastropod

Diodora singaporensis is a species of sea snail, a marine gastropod mollusk in the family Fissurellidae, the keyhole limpets.
