= Diodora tanneri =

Scientific classification
- Kingdom: Animalia
- Phylum: Mollusca
- Class: Gastropoda
- Subclass: Vetigastropoda
- Order: Lepetellida
- Family: Fissurellidae
- Genus: Diodora
- Species: D. tanneri

Binomial name
- Diodora tanneri (Verrill, 1882)

Species of gastropod

Diodora tanneri is a species of sea snail, a marine gastropod mollusk in the family Fissurellidae, the keyhole limpets.
