= Fissurella formosa =

Scientific classification
- Kingdom: Animalia
- Phylum: Mollusca
- Class: Gastropoda
- Subclass: Vetigastropoda
- Order: Lepetellida
- Family: Fissurellidae
- Genus: Fissurella
- Species: F. formosa

Binomial name
- Fissurella formosa Salvat, 1967

Species of gastropod

Fissurella formosa is a species of sea snail, a marine gastropod mollusk in the family Fissurellidae, the keyhole limpets. The species original name was Fissurella formosa F. Salvat.

== Description ==
Shell size varies between 11–21 mm.

== Distribution ==
Fissurella formosa is chiefly distributed around West Africa, especially in the region of Cape Verde.
