= List of marine molluscs of Angola =

Location of Angola

The list of marine molluscs of Angola is a list of marine species that form a part of the molluscan fauna of Angola. This list does not include the land or freshwater molluscs.

== Gastropoda ==
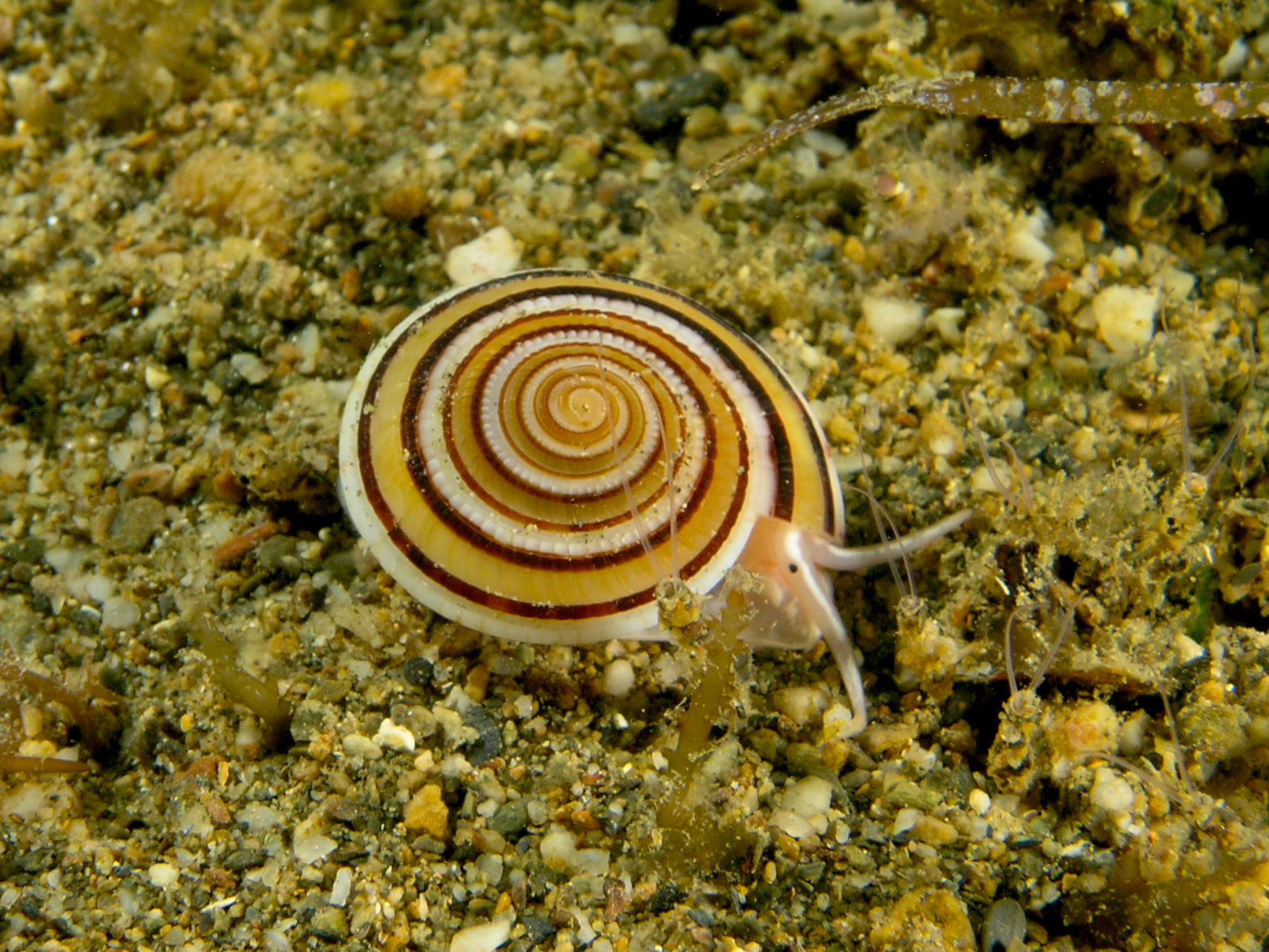
Architectonica perspectiva

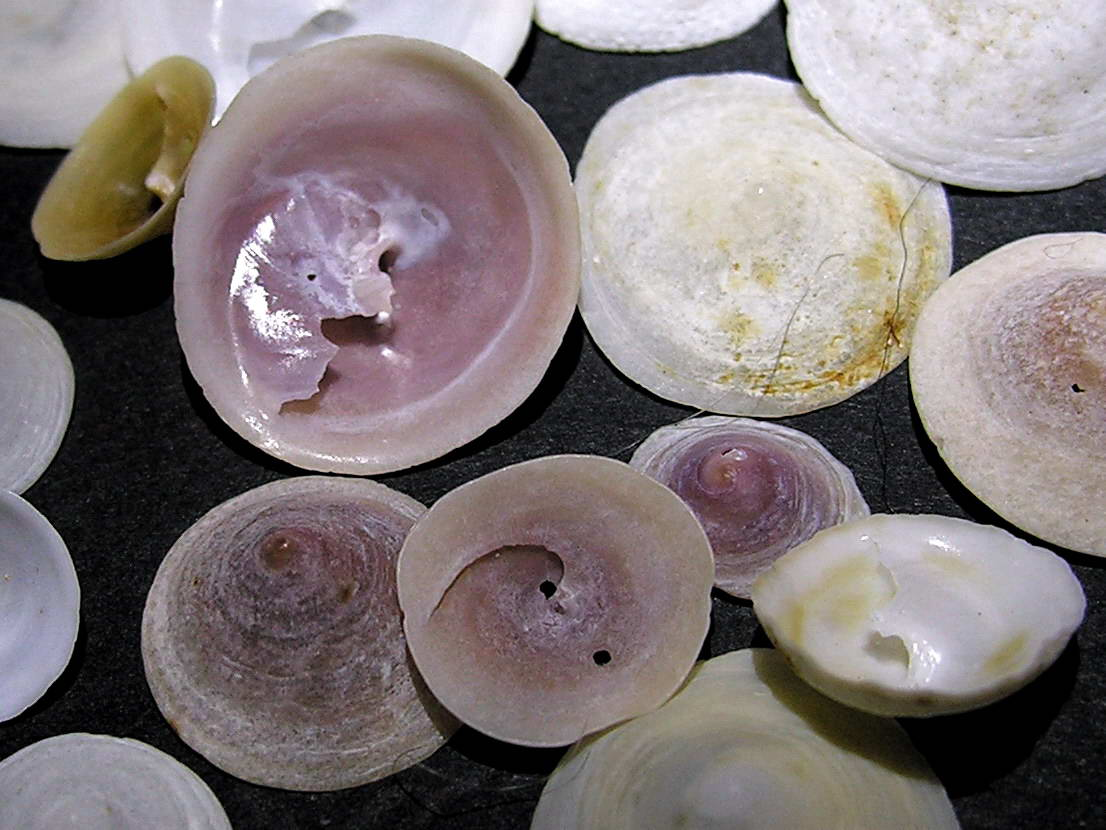
Various shells of Calyptraea chinensis

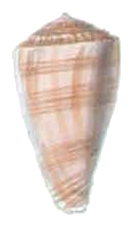
Drawing of the shell of Conus ambiguus

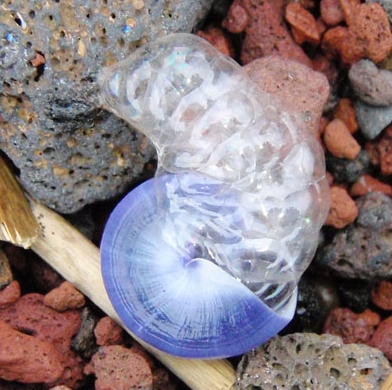
Janthina janthina

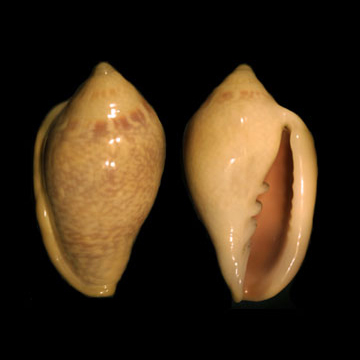
Apertural (right) and abapertural (left) views of a shell of Marginella glabella

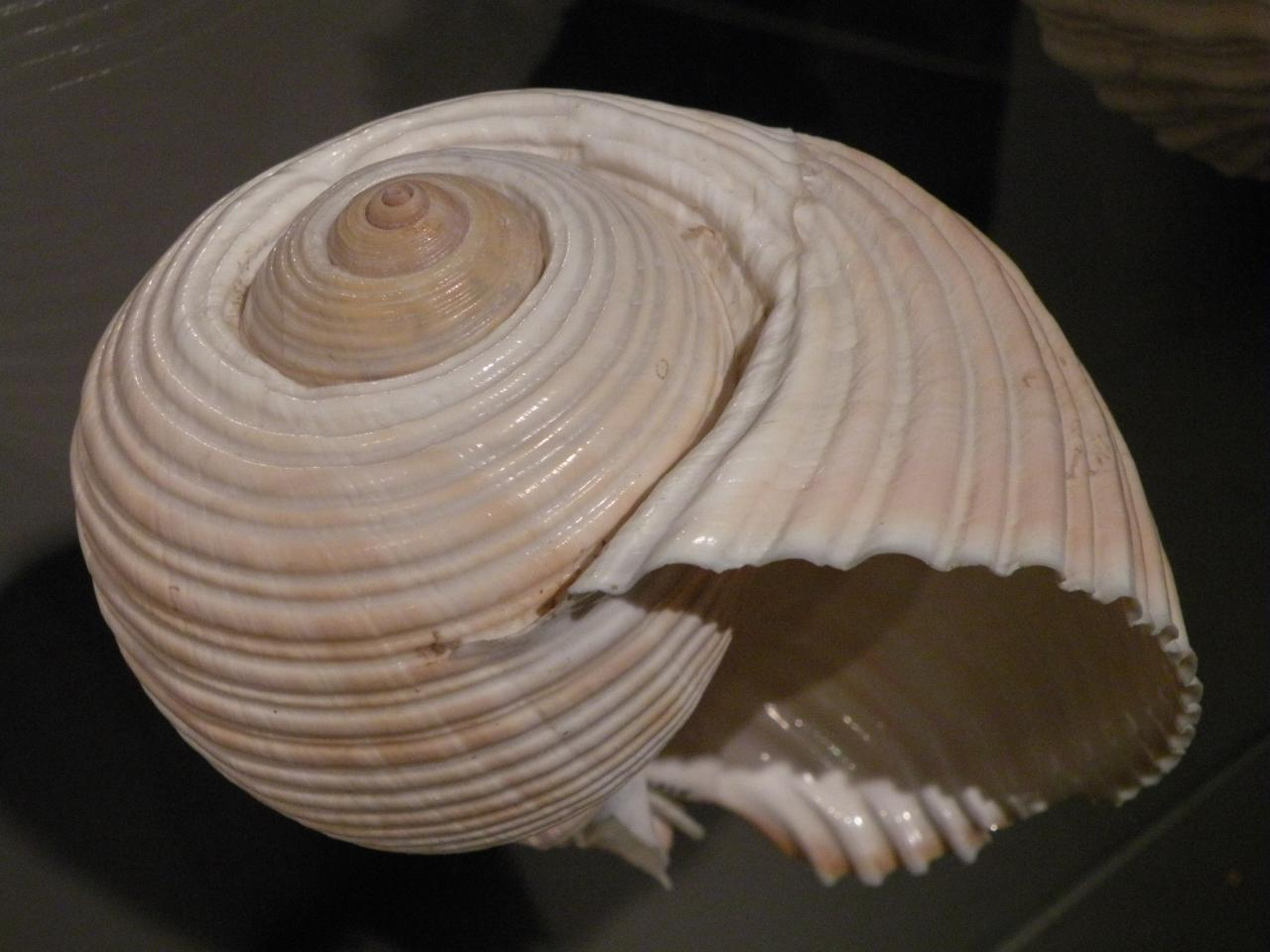
A shell of Tonna galea

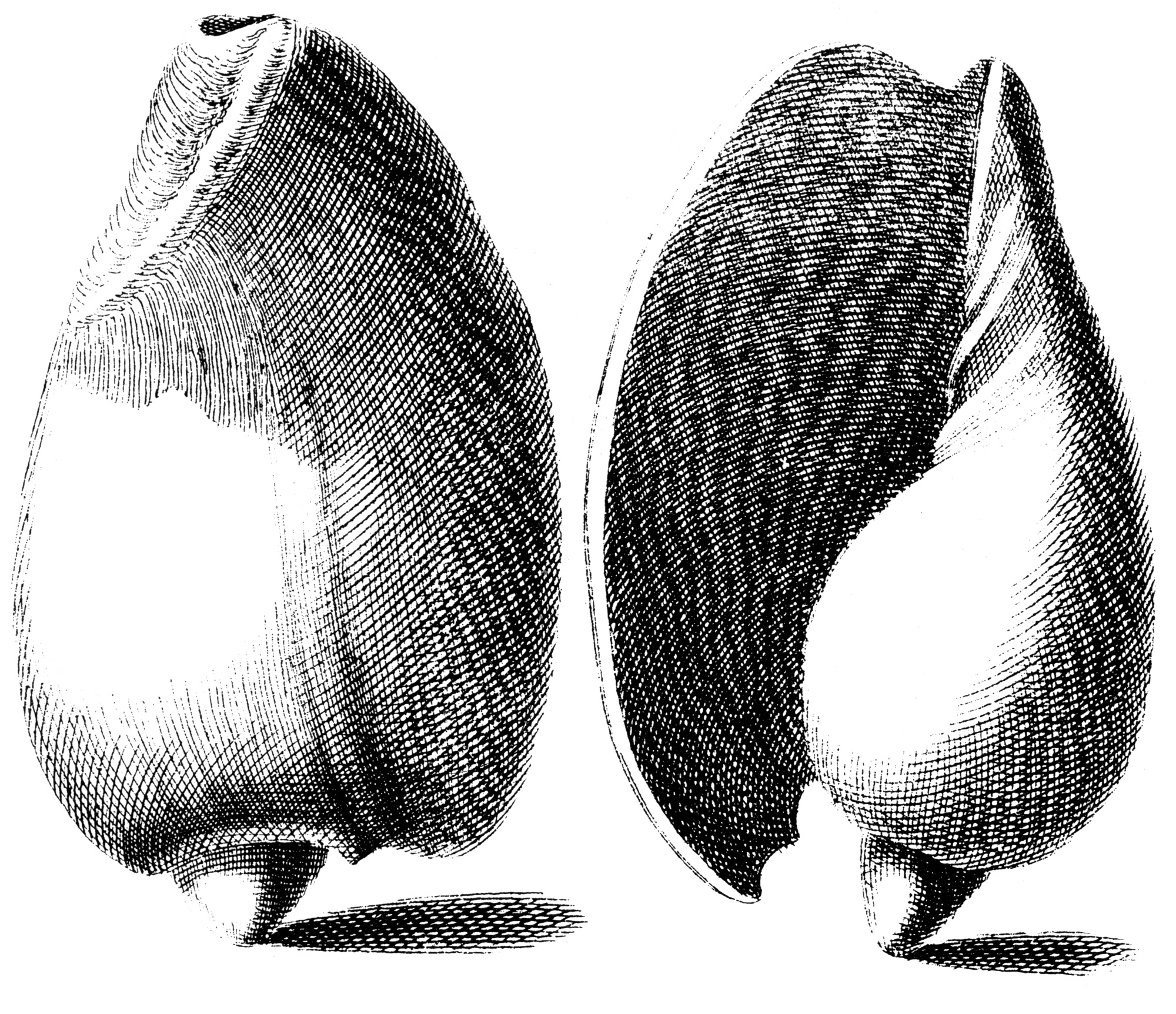
Drawing of a shell of Cymbium olla

Families and species of marine gastropods of the Angolan fauna include:

Family Acteonidae

- Acteon tornatilis

Family Architectonicidae

- Architectonica perspectiva
- Architectonica granulatum

Family Buccinidae

- Cantharus viverratus
- Phos grateloupianus
- Pisania d'orbignyi

Family Bullidae

- Bulla striata
- Bulla adansoni

Family Bursidae

- Bufonaria marginata
- Bursa pustulosa

Family Calyptraeidae

- Calyptraea chinensis
- Calyptraea trochiformis
- Crepidula porcellana

Family Cancellariidae

- Bivetiella similis
- Cancellaria cancellata

Family Cassidae

- Cassis spinosa

Family Cerithiidae

- Cerithium atratum

Family Columbellidae

- Columbella rustica

Family Conidae

- Conus adamsonii
- Conus ambiguus
- Conus ermineus
- Conus genuanus
- Conus mediterraneus
- Conus mercator
- Conus pulcher
- Conus striatellus
- Conus zebra
- Genota mitriformis
- Glyphostoma candida

Family Cypraeidae

- Cypraea lurida
- Cypraea picta
- Cypraea pyrum
- Cypraea rattus
- Cypraea sanguinolenta
- Cypraea stercoraria

Family Fasciolariidae

- Fusinus albinus
- Latirus armatus
- Latirus filosus

Family Fissurellidae

- Fissurella coarctata
- Fissurella nubecula
- Fissurella tarnieri
- Diodora menkeana

Family Harpidae

- Harpa rosea

Family Janthinidae

- Janthina janthina

Family Littorinidae

- Littorina cingulifera
- Littorina punctata
- Littorina angulifera

Family Marginellidae

- Marginella glabella

Family Melongenidae

- Pugilina morio

Family Mitridae

- Imbricaria carbonacea
- Mitra fusca

Family Muricidae

- Bolinus cornutus
- Hexaplex fulvescens
- Hexaplex varius
- Hexaplex duplex duplex
- Purpurellus pinniger
- Stramonita haemastoma
- Thais coronata
- Thais forbesi

Family Nassariidae

- Bullia callosa
- Bullia miran
- Cyllene lyrata

Family Neritidae

- Nerita senegalensis

Family Naticidae

- Natica adansoni
- Natica collaria
- Natica cruentata
- Natica flammulata
- Natica fulminea
- Natica fusca
- Natica gruveli
- Natica marochiensis
- Natica michaelis
- Natica rocquignyi
- Natica turtoni
- Natica variabilis
- Natica vittata
- Polinices lacteus
- Polinices grossularia
- Sigaretus concavus
- Sigaretus bifasciatus

Family Olividae

- Agaronia acuminata
- Oliva flammulata
- Oliva reticularis
- Olivancillaria nana
- Olivella pulchella

Family Patellidae

- Patella intermedia
- Patella safiana
- Patella natalensis

Family Pyramidellidae

- Pyramidella dolabrata

Family Ranellidae

- Cymatium (Septa) trigonum
- Distortrix ridens

Family Terebridae

- Acus senegalensis
- Hastula lepida
- Impages aciculina

Family Tonnidae

- Tonna galea

Family Trochidae

- Gibbula magus
- Clanculus villanus
- Clanculus guineensis
- Clanculus granoliratus

Family Turridae

- Clavatula muricata
- Clavatula rubrifasciata
- Clavatula spirata
- Perrona lineata
- Turris pluteata
- Turris undatiruga

Family Turritellidae

- Turritella britanica
- Turritella bicingulata
- Turritella praetermissa

Family Volutidae

- Cymbium gracile
- Cymbium olla

Family Xenophoridae

- Xenophora senegalensis

== Bivalvia ==
Families and species of marine bivalves of the Angolan fauna include:

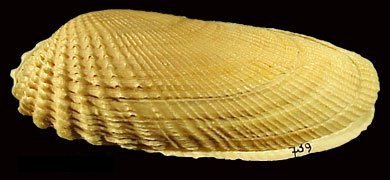
A shell of Petricola pholadiformis

Family Anomiidae

- Anomia ephippium

Family Arcidae

- Arca noe
- Senilia senilis

Family Cardiidae

- Cardium costatum
- Cardium ringens

Family Carditidae

- Beguina senegalensis
- Cardita lacunosa

Family Chamidae

- Chama crenulata
- Chama gryphina

Family Crassatellidae

- Crassatella divaricata

Family Donacidae

- Donax rugosus
- Donax serra
- Iphigenia rostrata
- Iphigenia laevigata

Family Limidae

- Limaria tuberculata

Family Mactridae

- Mactra glabrata
- Mactra largillierti
- Mactra nitida

Family Mytilidae

- Mytilus perna

Family Pectinidae

- Flexopecten glaber
- Pecten flabellum

Family Petricolidae

- Petricola lajonkairii
- Petricola pholadiformis

Family Pharidae

- Sinupharus africanus

Family Pholadidae

- Pholas campechiensis

Family Pinnidae

- Pinna rudis
- Pinna ramulosa

Family Psammobiidae

- Sanguinolaria sanguinolenta
- Solecurtus strigilatus
- Tagelus angulatus

Family Pteriidae

- Pteria atlantica

Family Solenidae

- Solen marginatus
- Solen guineensis

Family Tellinidae

- Tellina madagascariensis

Family Veneridae

- Chione paphia
- Irus irus
- Pitar floridella
- Tivela bicolor
- Venus rosalina
- Venus foliacea
- Venerupis senegalensis
- Venerupis dura
