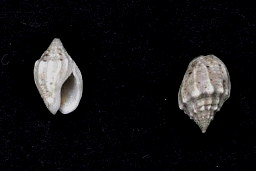
- Two shells of Cyllene lamarcki (museum specimens at Naturalis Biodiversity Center)

Scientific classification
- Kingdom: Animalia
- Phylum: Mollusca
- Class: Gastropoda
- Subclass: Caenogastropoda
- Order: Neogastropoda
- Family: Nassariidae
- Genus: Cyllene
- Species: C. lamarcki

Binomial name
- Cyllene lamarcki (Basterot, 1825) †

Synonyms
- Buccinum lyratum Lamarck, 1822 (invalid: junior homonym of Buccinum lyratum Gmelin, 1791; Cyllene desnoyersi lamarcki is a replacement name); Cyllene (Cyllene) lyrata (Lamarck, 1822) · accepted, alternate representation; Cyllene desnoyersi lamarcki Cernohorsky, 1975 (original rank); Cyllene lyrata (Lamarck, 1822) (preoccupied name)

= Cyllene lamarcki =

Species of gastropod

Cyllene lamarcki is a species of sea snail, a marine gastropod mollusk in the family Nassariidae, the Nassa mud snails or dog whelks.

Cernohorsky (1984) considers this as a chrono-subspecies of the Miocene Cyllene desnoyersi (Basterot, 1825)

== Description ==
The length of the shell varies between 10 mm and 17 mm.

The ovate shell is oblong and thick. It is of a bluish white, with distant red spots. The spire is short and pointed. It is composed of five or six indistinct whorls. The suture is simple. These whorls are ornamented with longitudinal folds or ribs, narrow, and regular, finer and closer towards the lip. Upon the body whorl, which is somewhat ventricose, the ribs are slightly arcuated throughout their whole length. They descend quite to the base, and towards that point they are intersected by transverse striae. Similar striae exist at the upper part of the lowest whorl, which is flattened. The aperture is elongated, and dilated in the middle. Its interior is violet colored. The thick outer lip is striated internally.

== Distribution ==
The species occurs in the Atlantic Ocean off Gabon, the Gulf of Guinea and Angola
