= Irus =

Irus or IRUS may refer to:

== People ==
- Irus Braverman, legal scholar and ethnographer
- In Greek mythology, see Irus (mythology)
  - Irus, a son of Actor and father of Eurytion and Eurydamas by Demonassa
  - Irus or Arnaeus, a character in The Odyssey

== Places ==
- Irus, Israel, a village in central Israel

== Science and technology ==
- Irus (bivalve), a genus of clam in the family Veneridae
- 13387 Irus, a minor planet
