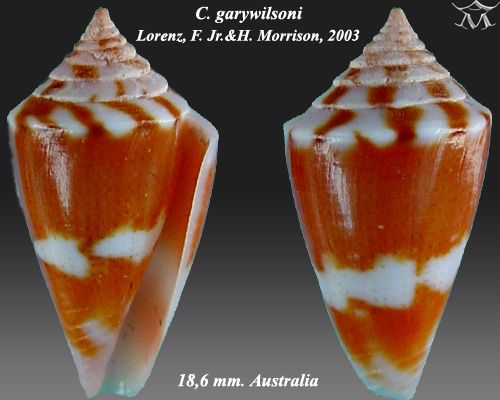
- Apertural and abapertural views of shell of Conus garywilsoni Lorenz, F. Jr.& H.Morrison, 2003

Scientific classification
- Kingdom: Animalia
- Phylum: Mollusca
- Class: Gastropoda
- Subclass: Caenogastropoda
- Order: Neogastropoda
- Superfamily: Conoidea
- Family: Conidae
- Genus: Conus
- Species: C. garywilsoni

Binomial name
- Conus garywilsoni Lorenz & Morrison, 2004

Synonyms
- Conus (Lividoconus) garywilsoni Lorenz & Morrison, 2004 · accepted, alternate representation; Calamiconus garywilsoni (Lorenz & Morrison, 2004)

= Conus garywilsoni =

Species of sea snail

Conus garywilsoni is a species of sea snail, a marine gastropod mollusk in the family Conidae, the cone snails and their allies.

Like all species within the genus Conus, these snails are predatory and venomous. They are capable of stinging humans, therefore live ones should be handled carefully or not at all.

== Etymology (origin of the name) ==
Conus garywilsoni is named after Gary Wilson, a conchologist (shell collector and expert) from Western Australia. This honors his significant contributions to the knowledge of cone snails in the region.

== Description ==
The length of an adult shell varies between 15 mm and 21 mm.

Conus garywilsoni is considered a relatively small species within the diverse Conus genus, which includes species ranging from a few millimeters to over 20 centimeters. This makes its size a notable characteristic.

== Distribution ==
This marine species is endemic to Australia and can be found off the North West Cape, Western Australia, which includes locations such as Exmouth. Specimens have been collected by SCUBA diving about 40 meters below sea level, typically on a sand bottom among algae.
