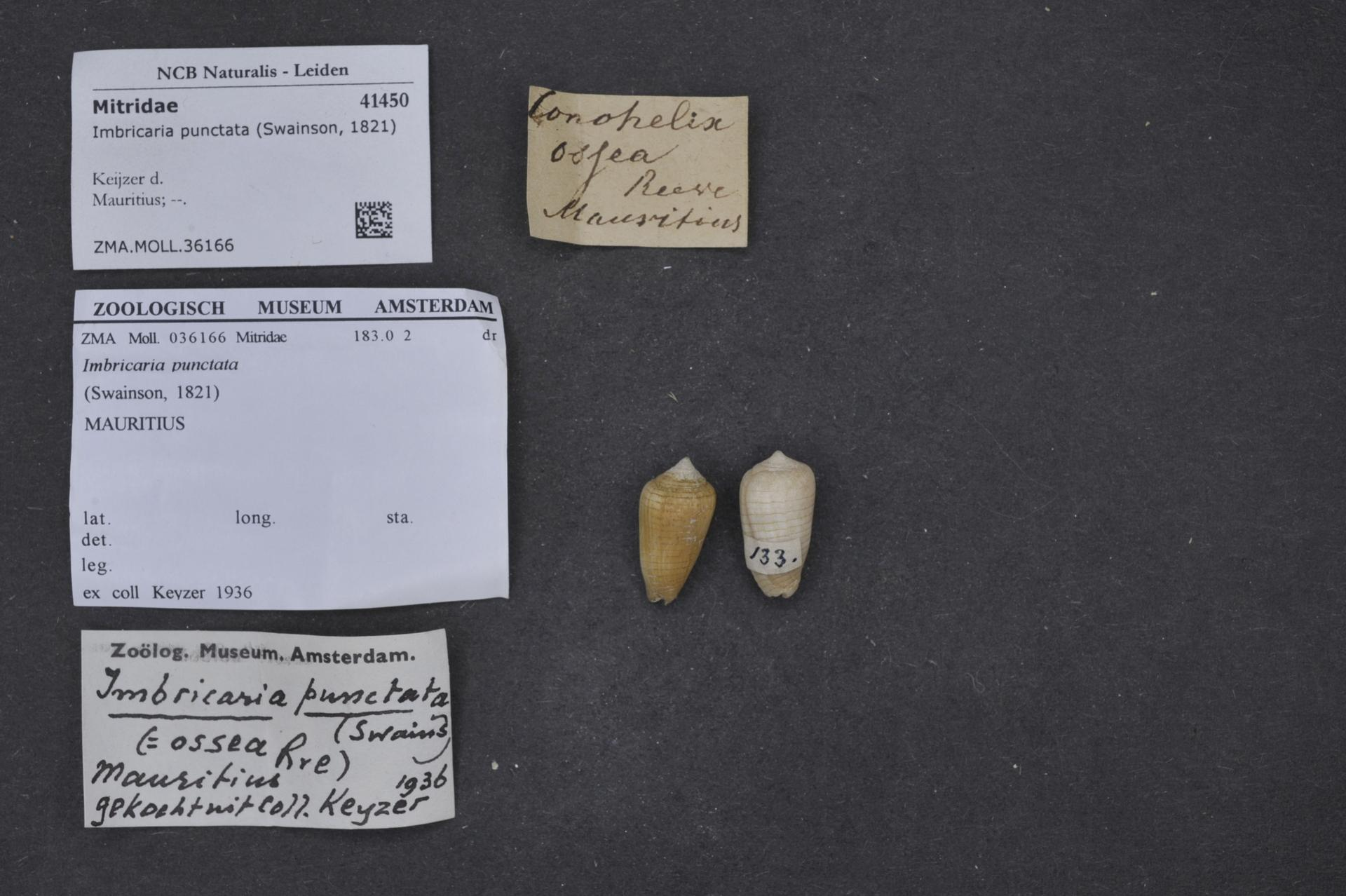
- Imbricata punctata

Scientific classification
- Kingdom: Animalia
- Phylum: Mollusca
- Class: Gastropoda
- Subclass: Caenogastropoda
- Order: Neogastropoda
- Superfamily: Mitroidea
- Family: Mitridae
- Genus: Imbricariopsis
- Species: I. punctata

Binomial name
- Imbricariopsis punctata (Swainson, 1821)

Synonyms
- Conoelix punctatus Swainson, 1821 (original combination); Conus dentatus Schröter, 1803 (unused senior synonym); Imbricaria punctata (Swainson, 1821); Pterygia punctata (Swainson, 1821)

= Imbricariopsis punctata =

Species of gastropod

Imbricariopsis punctata, common name the bone-like mitre, is a species of sea snail, a marine gastropod mollusk in the family Mitridae, the miters or miter snails.

== Description ==
=== Exterior Shell and Structure ===
The length of the shell varies between 11 mm and 25 mm. The original description (as Conoelix punctatus) describes the shell cream colored with a short spire, a five-plaited pillar, and minutely punctured capillary transverse striae. The large body whorl of I. punctata is sandy yellow to tan colored, with a lighter spire beginning at the shoulder, which may be white to cream. The sculpture of the shell has spiral pitted grooves that follow the curve of the body whorl. The shell has a straight columella with 4 to 5 spiral folds. The outer lip of the shell is described as and can be seen in specimen photos as mostly straight.

=== Live Snail ===
Live snail specimens of I. punctata show the body of the snail as cream colored, light grey, or yellow with irregular white spots, with the tentacle and tentacle pedestal having brown accents. The eye stalks are short and the snail uses lens eyes. As the snail is carnivorous, it has a proboscis in addition to, and which contains, the radula.

== Distribution and Habitat ==
This marine species occurs in the Indian Ocean off the Mascarenes, Aldabra and Réunion; also off New Guinea. I. punctata is a marine benthic snail, with most specimens being found less than 10 meters below the surface, though some sources report that the snail has been found in sand up to 24 meters below the surface.

== Behavior ==
=== Reproduction ===
I. punctata reproduces sexually and is a non-broadcast spawner.

=== Diet ===
Species in Mitridae are carnivorous and prey primarily upon marine worms, sipunculids, and other mollusks.

=== Locomotion ===
I. punctata utilizes mucus mediated gliding.
