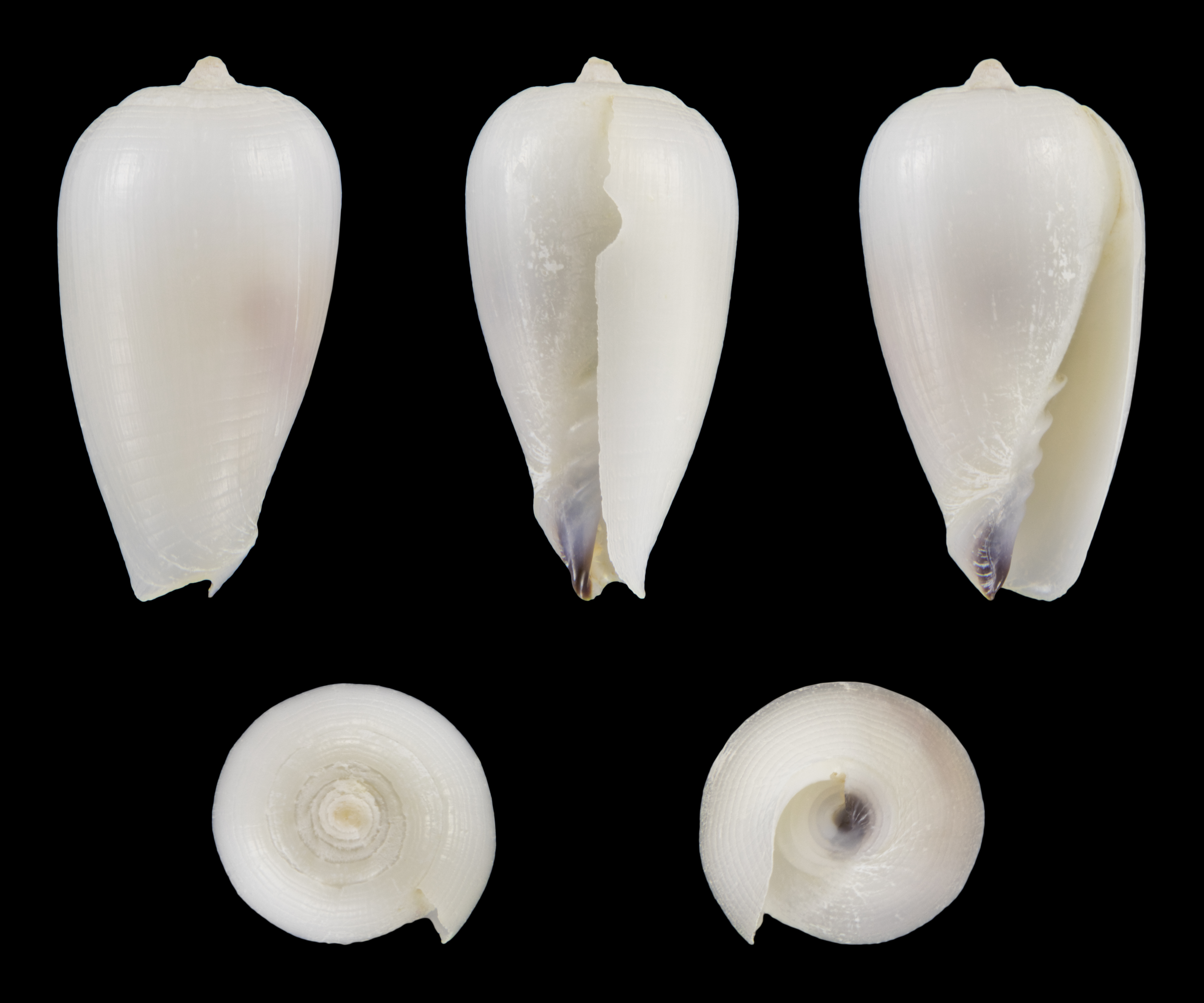
- Shell of Imbricariopsis conovula

Scientific classification
- Kingdom: Animalia
- Phylum: Mollusca
- Class: Gastropoda
- Subclass: Caenogastropoda
- Order: Neogastropoda
- Family: Mitridae
- Genus: Imbricariopsis
- Species: I. conovula

Binomial name
- Imbricariopsis conovula (Quoy & Gaimard, 1833)

Synonyms
- Imbricaria conovula (Quoy & Gaimard, 1833); Mitra conovula Quoy & Gaimard, 1833

= Imbricariopsis conovula =

Species of gastropod

Imbricariopsis conovula, common name the egg miter, is a species of sea snail, a marine gastropod mollusk in the family Mitridae, the miters or miter snails.

== Description ==
=== External Shell and Structure ===
The length of the shell varies between 8 mm and 20 mm. The shell has an obconic shape with a short spire and inflated whorls. I. conovula is a white shell with a small patch of purple on the anterior end and with spiral striae on the body whorl. The outer lip is nearly straight vertically in line with the columella and the aperture is narrow. The shell has 5-6 columellar folds visible through the aperture and 5-6 whorls on the spire as seen in specimen photos.

=== Live Snail ===
The live snail residing inside of the shell utilizes a radula to acquire prey. I. conovula uses lens eyes.

== Distribution and Habitat ==
This marine species occurs off Vanikoro, Solomon Islands; off Hawaii, Mauritius and Northern Australia. I. conovula is a marine benthic snail that is typically found in sand no deeper than 10 feet below the surface.

== Life Habits ==
=== Reproduction ===
I. conovula reproduces sexually.

=== Diet ===
This species is a predator, which primarily feeds on Aspidosiphon (Paraspidosiphon) tenuis and Apionsoma, types of marine worms.

=== Locomotion ===
I. conovula moves by mucus mediated gliding.
