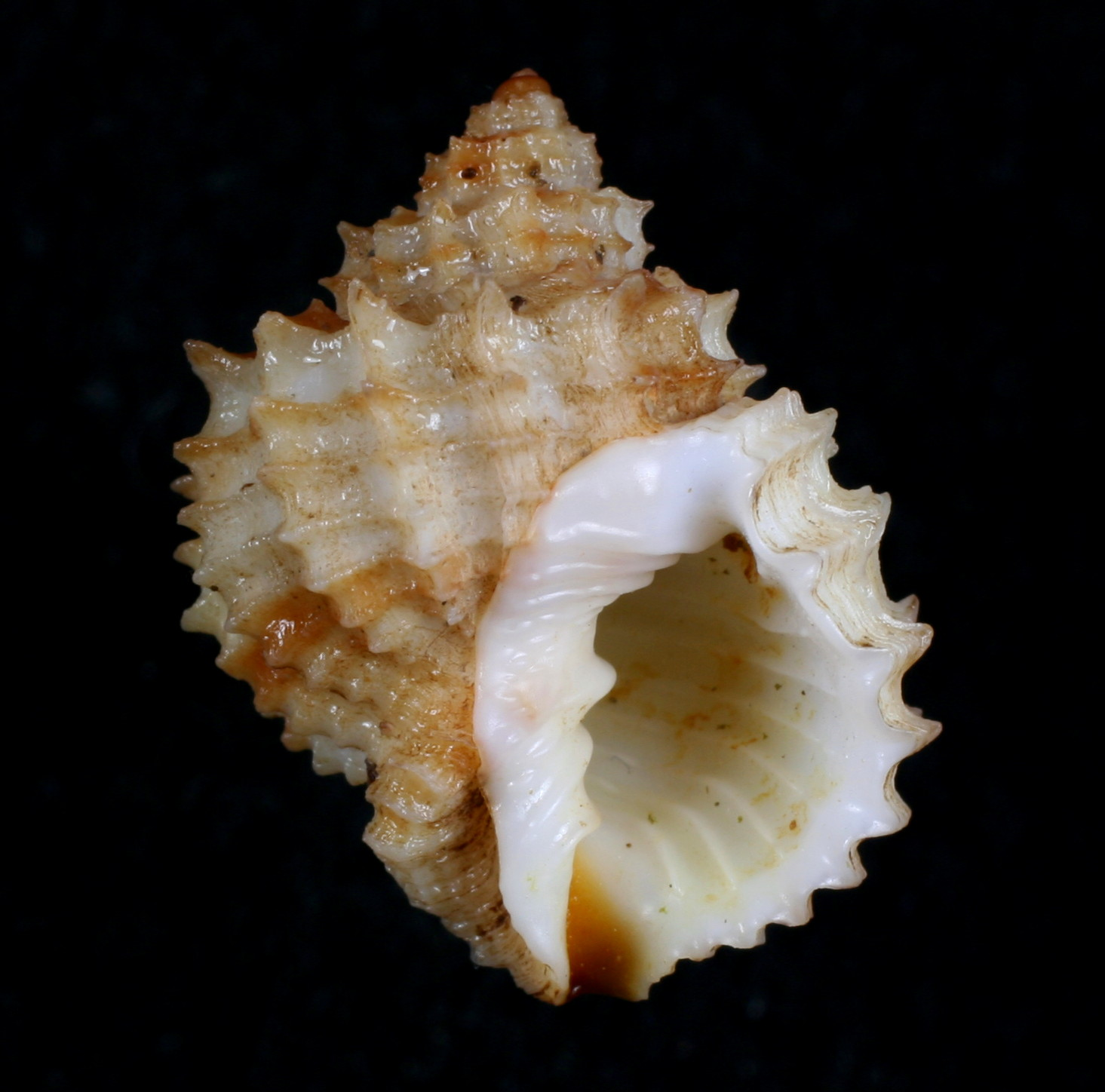
- Apertural view of shell of Bivetiella pulchra (Sowerby G.B. I, 1832)

Scientific classification
- Kingdom: Animalia
- Phylum: Mollusca
- Class: Gastropoda
- Subclass: Caenogastropoda
- Order: Neogastropoda
- Family: Cancellariidae
- Genus: Bivetiella
- Species: B. pulchra

Binomial name
- Bivetiella pulchra (Sowerby G.B. I, 1832)

= Bivetiella pulchra =

Species of gastropod

Bivetiella pulchra is a species of sea snail, a marine gastropod mollusk in the family Cancellariidae, the nutmeg snails.
