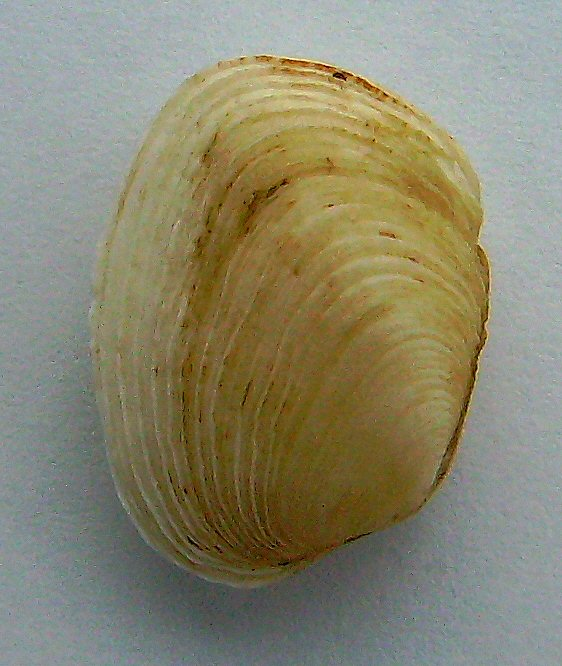

Scientific classification
- Kingdom: Animalia
- Phylum: Mollusca
- Class: Bivalvia
- Order: Venerida
- Family: Veneridae
- Genus: Irus
- Species: I. reflexus

Binomial name
- Irus reflexus (Gray, 1843)

Synonyms
- Venerupis reflexa Gray, 1843; Venerupis siliqua Deshayes, 1854; Venerupis tumida G. B. Sowerby II, 1854

= Irus reflexus =

Species of bivalve

Irus reflexus is a bivalve mollusc of the family Veneridae.
