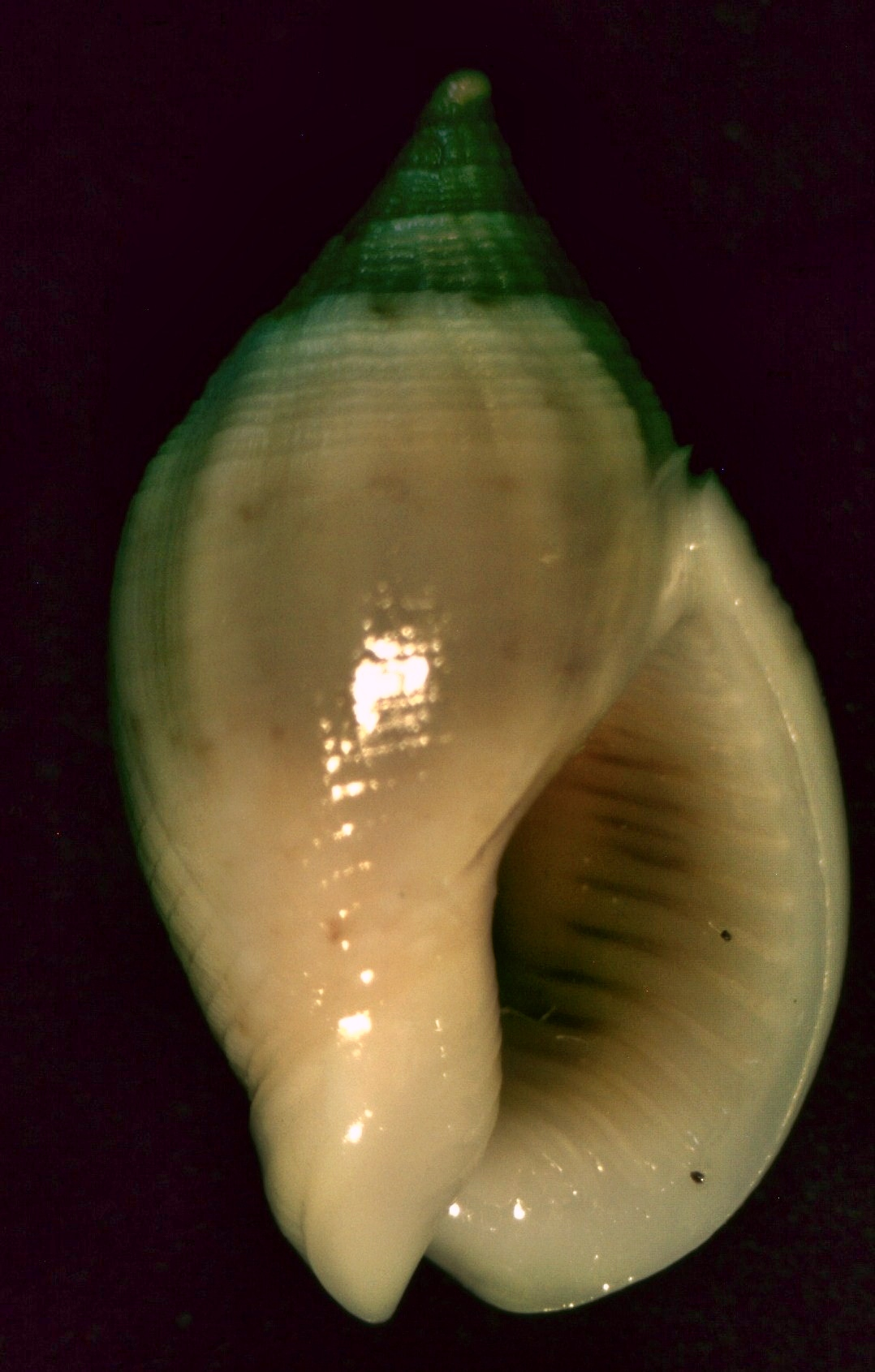
- Cyllene sulcata

Scientific classification
- Kingdom: Animalia
- Phylum: Mollusca
- Class: Gastropoda
- Subclass: Caenogastropoda
- Order: Neogastropoda
- Superfamily: Buccinoidea
- Family: Nassariidae
- Genus: Cyllene [[[John Edward Gray|Gray]] in Griffith & Pidgeon, 1834

Type species
- Cyllene owenii Gray, J.E. in Griffith, E. & E. Pidgeon, 1834

Synonyms
- Cyllene (Cyllene) Gray, 1834; Radulphus Iredale, 1924

= Cyllene (gastropod) =

Genus of sea snails

Cyllene is a genus of sea snails, marine gastropod mollusks in the family Nassariidae, the nassa mud snails or dog whelks.

== Description ==
The shell is ovate. The spire is short, acute with the suture canaliculated. The columella is concave, smooth or finely grooved. The outer lip shows a slight sinus at the forepart and is emarginate posteriorly and grooved internally.

The acute operculum is ovate.

== Species ==
Species within the genus Cyllene include:

- † Cyllene angsanana K. Martin, 1921
- Cyllene cernohorskyi Fernandes & Rolán, 1992
- Cyllene chelonia Lorenz, 2023
- Cyllene concinna A. Adams, 1851
- † Cyllene desnoyersi (Basterot, 1825)
- Cyllene fuscata A. Adams, 1851
- † Cyllene gracilenta (Yokoyama, 1928)
- Cyllene grayi Reeve, 1846
- Cyllene lactea Adams & Angas, 1864
- Cyllene lamarcki Cernohorsky, 1975
- Cyllene lugubris Adams & Reeve, 1850
- Cyllene orientalis A. Adams, 1851
- Cyllene owenii Gray in Griffith & Pidgeon, 1834
- Cyllene parvula Bozzetti, 2014
- † Cyllene pretiosa Vredenburg, 1924
- Cyllene pulchella Adams & Reeve, 1850
- Cyllene royana (Iredale, 1924)
- Cyllene rubrolineata G.B. Sowerby II, 1870
- † Cyllene satoi Amano, 2019
- Cyllene sibogae Schepman, 1911
- † Cyllene smithi K. Martin, 1884
- Cyllene sulcata G.B. Sowerby II, 1859
- Cyllene unimaculata A. Adams, 1855
- † Cyllene vredenburgi Gupta, 1930

Species brought into synonymy

- † Cyllene degrangei Peyrot, 1927: synonym of † Cyllene desnoyersi (Basterot, 1825)
- Cyllene glabrata A. Adams, 1851 : synonym of Cyllene pulchella Adams & Reeve, 1850
- † Cyllene helvetica Peyrot, 1927: synonym of † Cyllenina helvetica (Peyrot, 1927)
- Cyllene japonica Pilsbry, 1904 : synonym of Cyllene concinna A. Adams, 1851
- Cyllene lamarcki Cernohorsky, 1975 : synonym of Cyllene desnoyersi lamarcki Cernohorsky, 1975
- Cyllene lyrata Lamarck: synonym of Cyllene desnoyersi lamarcki; synonym of Cyllene lamarcki Cernohorsky, 1975
- Cyllene lyratum (Lamarck, 1822) : synonym of Cyllene desnoyersi lamarcki Cernohorsky, 1975
- Cyllene oblonga Schepman, 1911 : synonym of Cyllene pulchella Adams & Reeve, 1850
- Cyllene pallida A. Adams, 1851 : synonym of Cyllene grayi Reeve, 1846
- Cyllene plumbea Sowerby, 1859 : synonym of Cyllene grayi Reeve, 1846
- Cyllene senegalensis Petit de la Saussaye, 1853 : synonym of Cyllene owenii Gray in Griffith & Pidgeon, 1834
- Cyllene striata A. Adams, 1851 : synonym of Cyllene pulchella Adams & Reeve, 1850
- Cyllene sulcata H. Adams & A. Adams, 1854: synonym of Cyllene sulcata G. B. Sowerby II, 1859
- Cyllene varians Cossmann, 1903 : synonym of Cyllene grayi Reeve, 1846
- Cyllene (Cyllene) bantamensis Oostingh, 1939 : synonym of Cyllene pulchella Adams & Reeve, 1850
- Cyllene (Cyllene) lyrata (Lamarck, 1822) : synonym of Cyllene desnoyersi lamarcki Cernohorsky, 1975
- Cyllene (Cyllene) varians Cossman, 1903 : synonym of Cyllene grayi Reeve, 1846
