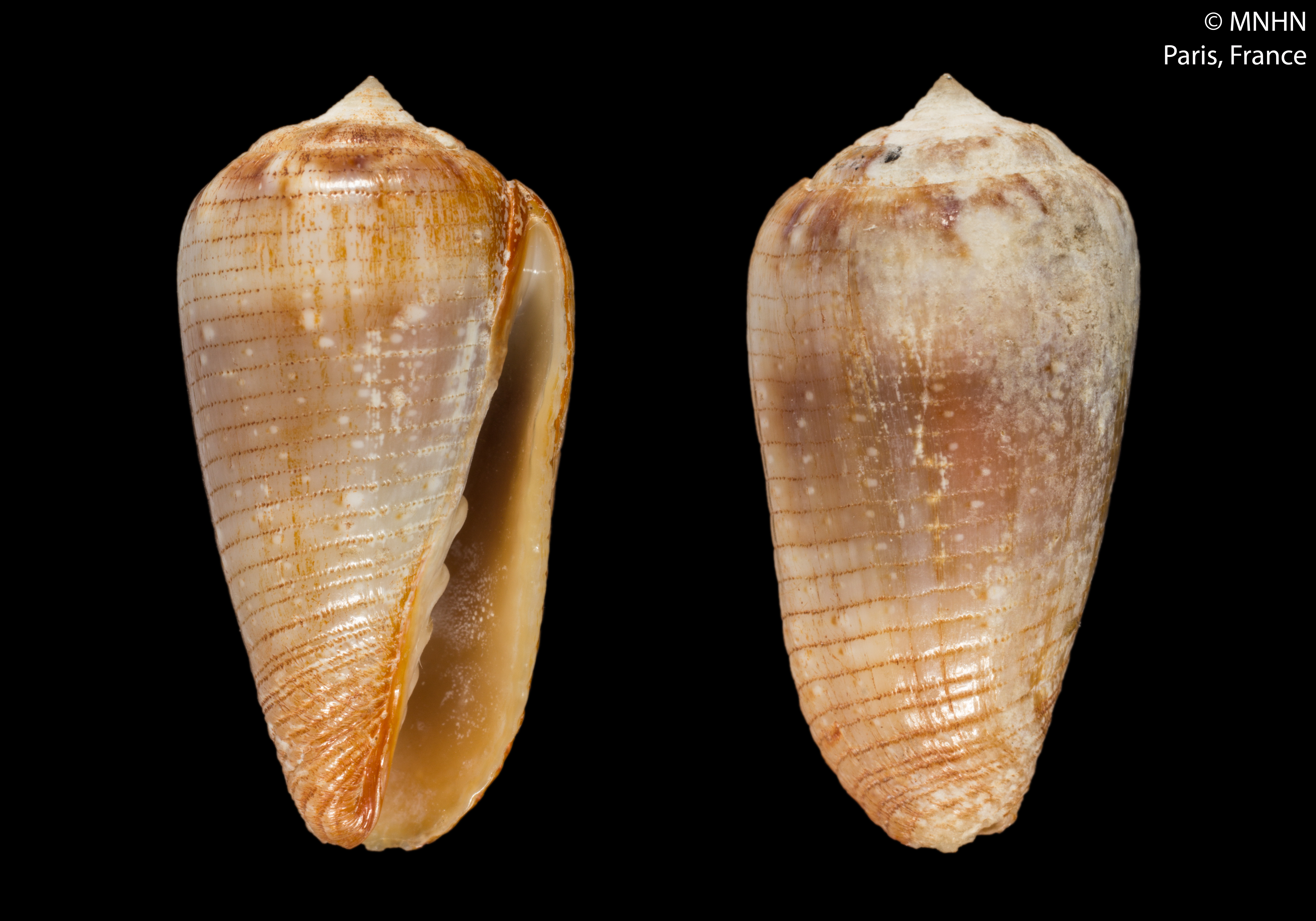
- Shell of Imbricaria vanikorensis (specimen at MNHN, Paris)

Scientific classification
- Kingdom: Animalia
- Phylum: Mollusca
- Class: Gastropoda
- Subclass: Caenogastropoda
- Order: Neogastropoda
- Family: Mitridae
- Genus: Imbricariopsis
- Species: I. vanikorensis

Binomial name
- Imbricariopsis vanikorensis (Quoy & Gaimard, 1833)

Synonyms
- Imbricaria vanikorensis (Quoy & Gaimard, 1833); Imbricaria vanikoroensis [sic] (misspelling); Mitra vanikorensis Quoy & Gaimard, 1833

= Imbricariopsis vanikorensis =

Species of gastropod

Imbricariopsis vanikorensis, commonly named the Vanikoro mitre, is a species of sea snail, a marine gastropod mollusk in the family Mitridae, the miters or miter snails.

== Description ==
The length of the shell varies between 9 mm and 20 mm.

== Distribution ==
This marine species occurs in the Red Sea and Southern Japan;also off Vanikoro, the Solomons and Fiji.
