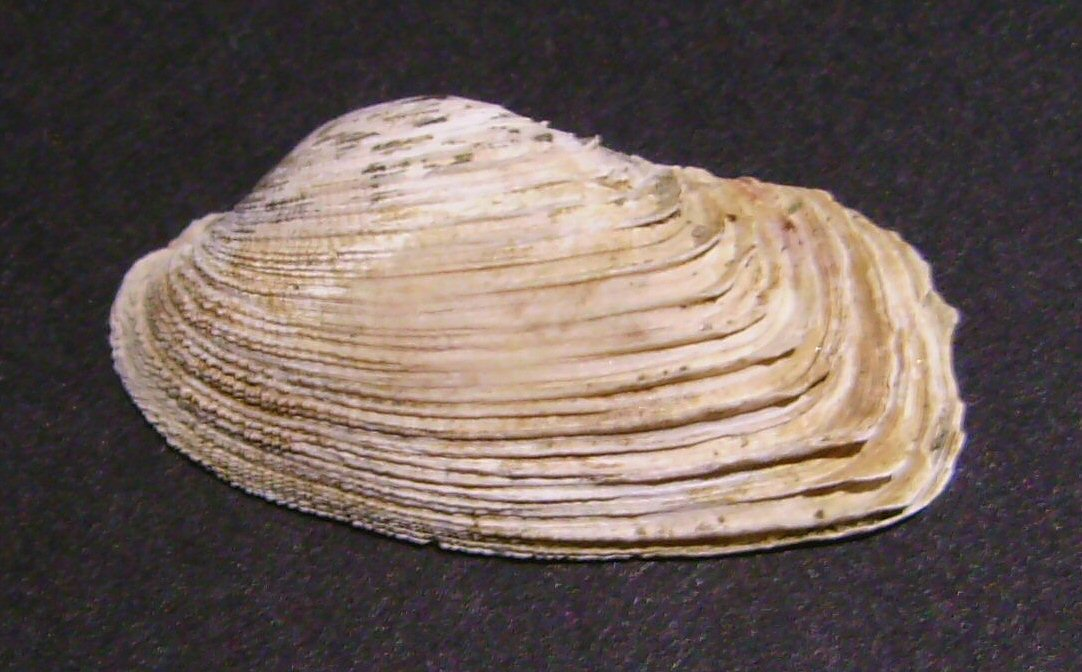

Scientific classification
- Kingdom: Animalia
- Phylum: Mollusca
- Class: Bivalvia
- Order: Venerida
- Superfamily: Veneroidea
- Family: Veneridae
- Genus: Irus
- Species: I. elegans

Binomial name
- Irus elegans (Deshayes, 1854)

= Irus elegans =

Species of bivalve

Irus elegans is a bivalve mollusc of the family Veneridae.
