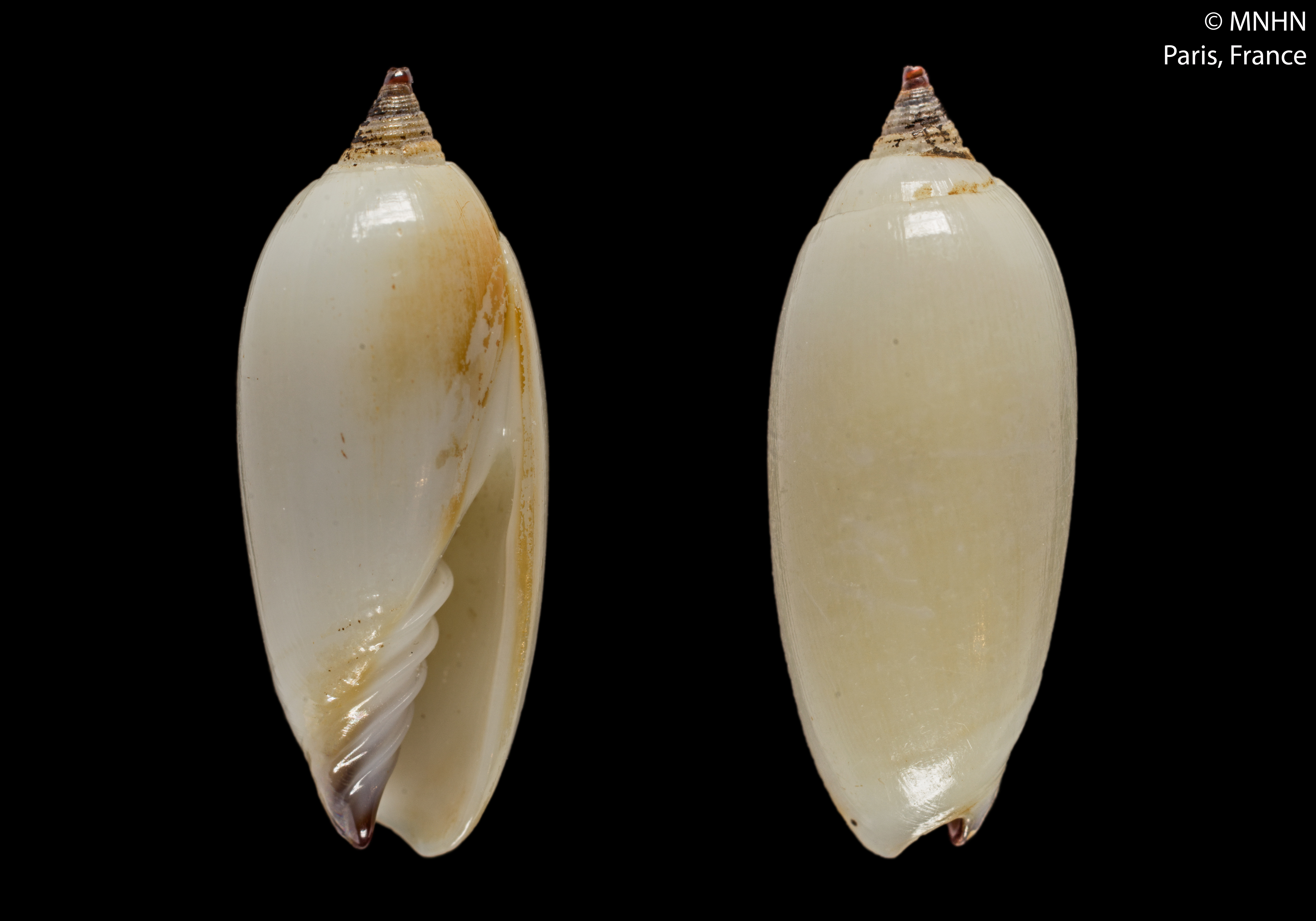
- Shell of Imbricariopsis conovula

Scientific classification
- Kingdom: Animalia
- Phylum: Mollusca
- Class: Gastropoda
- Subclass: Caenogastropoda
- Order: Neogastropoda
- Superfamily: Mitroidea
- Family: Mitridae
- Genus: Imbricariopsis; Fedosov, Herrmann, Kantor & Bouchet, 2018

Type species
- Imbricariopsis punctata (Swainson, 1821)

Species
- See text

= Imbricariopsis =

Genus of gastropods

Imbricariopsis is a genus of sea snails, marine gastropod mollusks in the family Mitridae.

== Species ==
Species within the genus Imbricariopsis include:

- Imbricariopsis carbonacea (Hinds, 1844)
- Imbricariopsis conovula (Quoy & Gaimard, 1833)
- Imbricariopsis punctata (Swainson, 1821)
- Imbricariopsis vanikorensis (Quoy & Gaimard, 1833)
