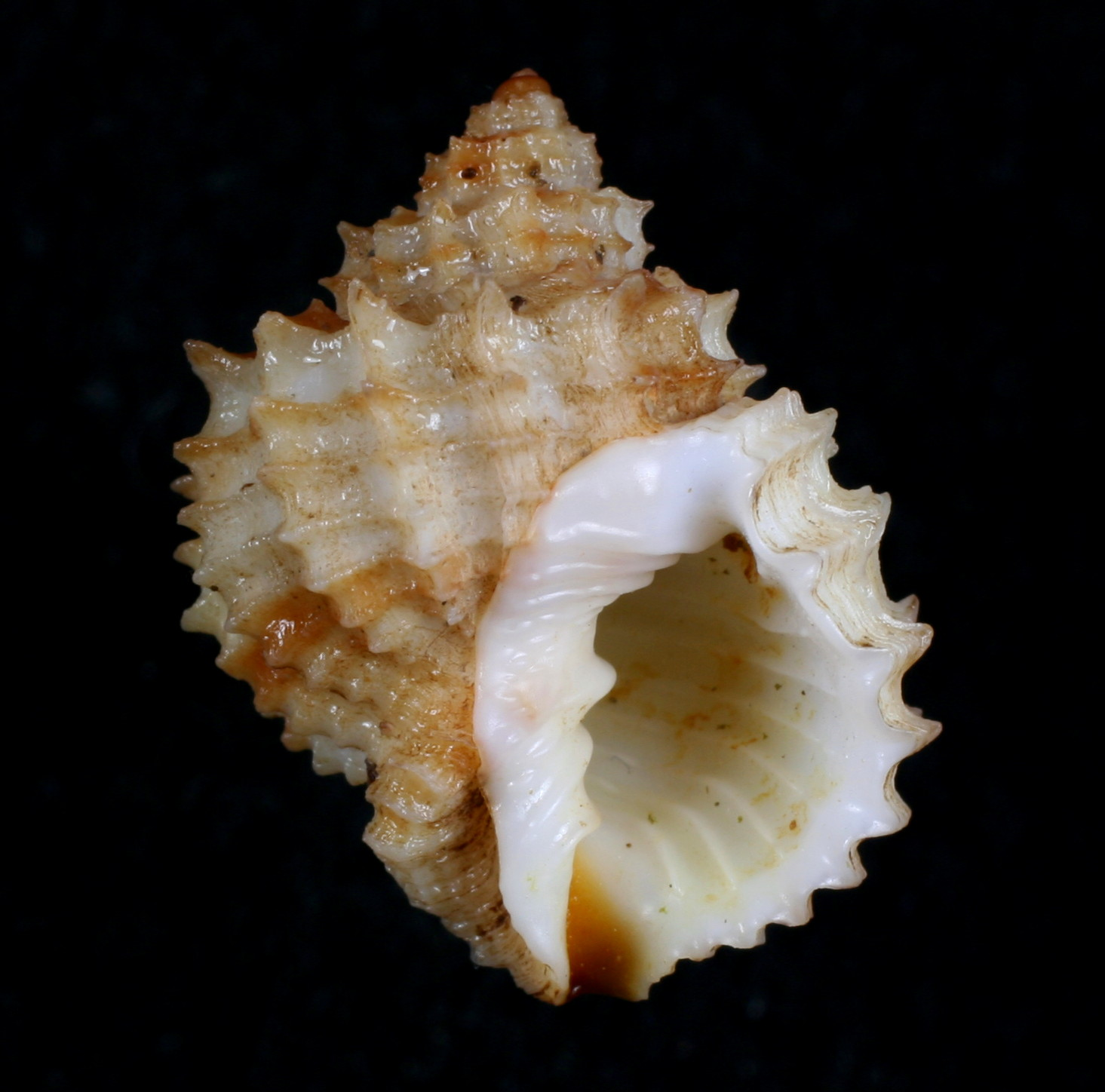
- Apertural view of shell of Bivetiella pulchra (Sowerby, 1832)

Scientific classification
- Kingdom: Animalia
- Phylum: Mollusca
- Class: Gastropoda
- Subclass: Caenogastropoda
- Order: Neogastropoda
- Family: Cancellariidae
- Genus: Bivetiella; Wenz, 1943

= Bivetiella =

Genus of gastropods

Bivetiella is a genus of sea snails, marine gastropod mollusks in the family Cancellariidae, the nutmeg snails.

== Species ==
Species within the genus Bivetiella include:

- Bivetiella cancellata (Linnaeus, 1767)
- Bivetiella pulchra G.B. Sowerby I, 1832
- Bivetiella similis (Sowerby G.B. I, 1833)
