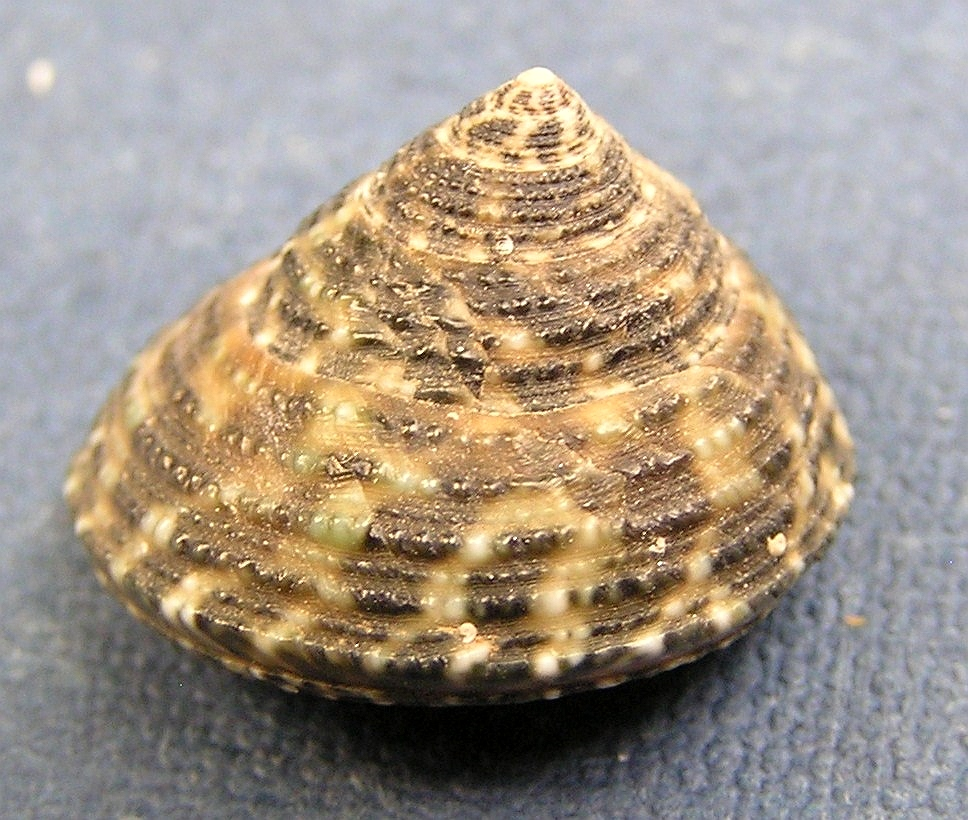
- Clanculus villanus

Scientific classification
- Kingdom: Animalia
- Phylum: Mollusca
- Class: Gastropoda
- Subclass: Vetigastropoda
- Order: Trochida
- Family: Trochidae
- Genus: Clanculus
- Species: C. villanus

Binomial name
- Clanculus villanus (Philippi R.A., 1846)

Synonyms
- Monodonta villana Philippi, 1846 (original combination); Trochus villanus (Philippi)

= Clanculus villanus =

Species of gastropod

Clanculus villanus is a species of sea snail, a marine gastropod mollusk in the family Trochidae, the top snails.

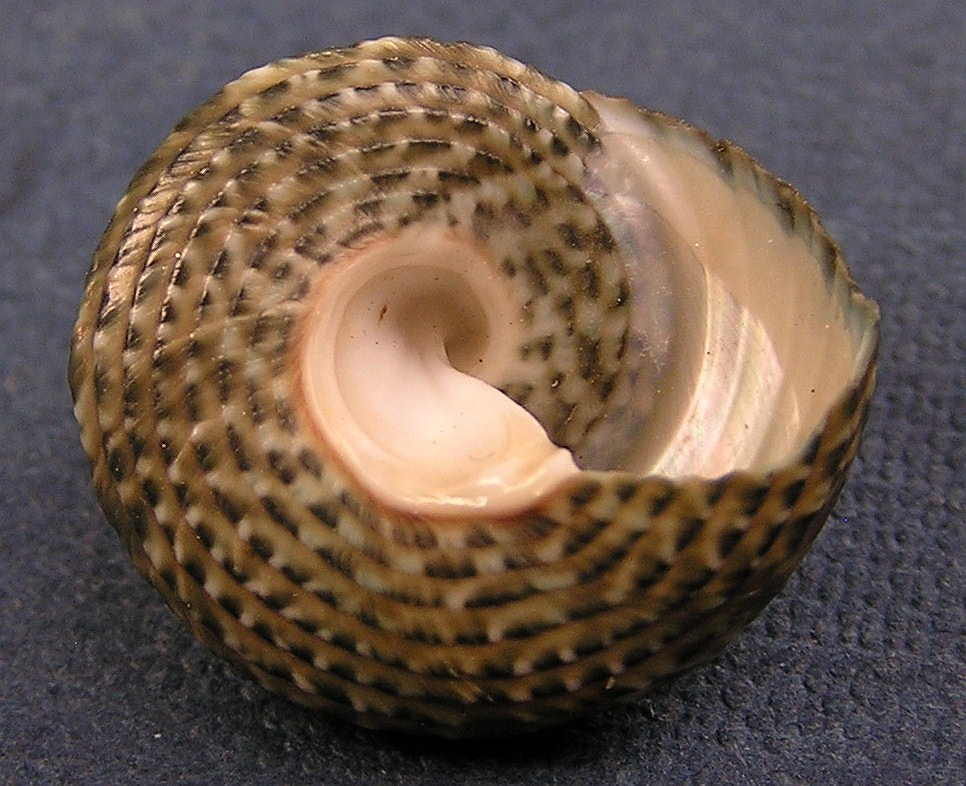
Apertural view of Clanculus villanus

== Description ==
The size of an adult shell varies between 10 mm and 21 mm. It differs from the typical forms of Clanculus in lacking the strong tooth at the base of the columella. The very solid shell has a conical shape. It is cinereous-olive or purplish, lighter beneath, and sparsely dotted with black. The about 6 whorls are slightly convex, and spirally lirate. The body whorl is encircled by about 14 granose separated lirae, of which about 6 are on the upper surface, their interstices bearing spiral stripe. The body whorl is obtusely angular at the periphery, slightly convex beneath, a little descending anteriorly. The aperture is rounded-tetragonal. The outer and basal lips are plicate within. The columella is as in Clanculus guineensis Gmelin, 1791 but longer. The narrow umbilicus is deep. The parietal wall is slightly calloused and is wrinkled.

== Distribution ==
This species occurs in the Atlantic Ocean off Senegal and Gabon.
