= Imbricariopsis carbonacea =

Scientific classification
- Kingdom: Animalia
- Phylum: Mollusca
- Class: Gastropoda
- Subclass: Caenogastropoda
- Order: Neogastropoda
- Family: Mitridae
- Genus: Imbricariopsis
- Species: I. carbonacea

Binomial name
- Imbricariopsis carbonacea (Hinds, 1844)

Synonyms
- Imbricaria carbonacea Hinds, 1844; Mitra (Sohlia) carbonacea (Hinds, 1844); Mitra carbonacea (Hinds, 1844)

Species of gastropod

Imbricariopsis carbonacea, common name carbon imbricaria, is a species of sea snail, a marine gastropod mollusk in the family Mitridae, the miters or miter snails.

== Description ==
The length of the shell varies between 17 mm and 32 mm.

== Distribution ==
This marine species occurs off West Africa (including Mauritania and the Cape Verde Islands) and Angola to South Africa.
