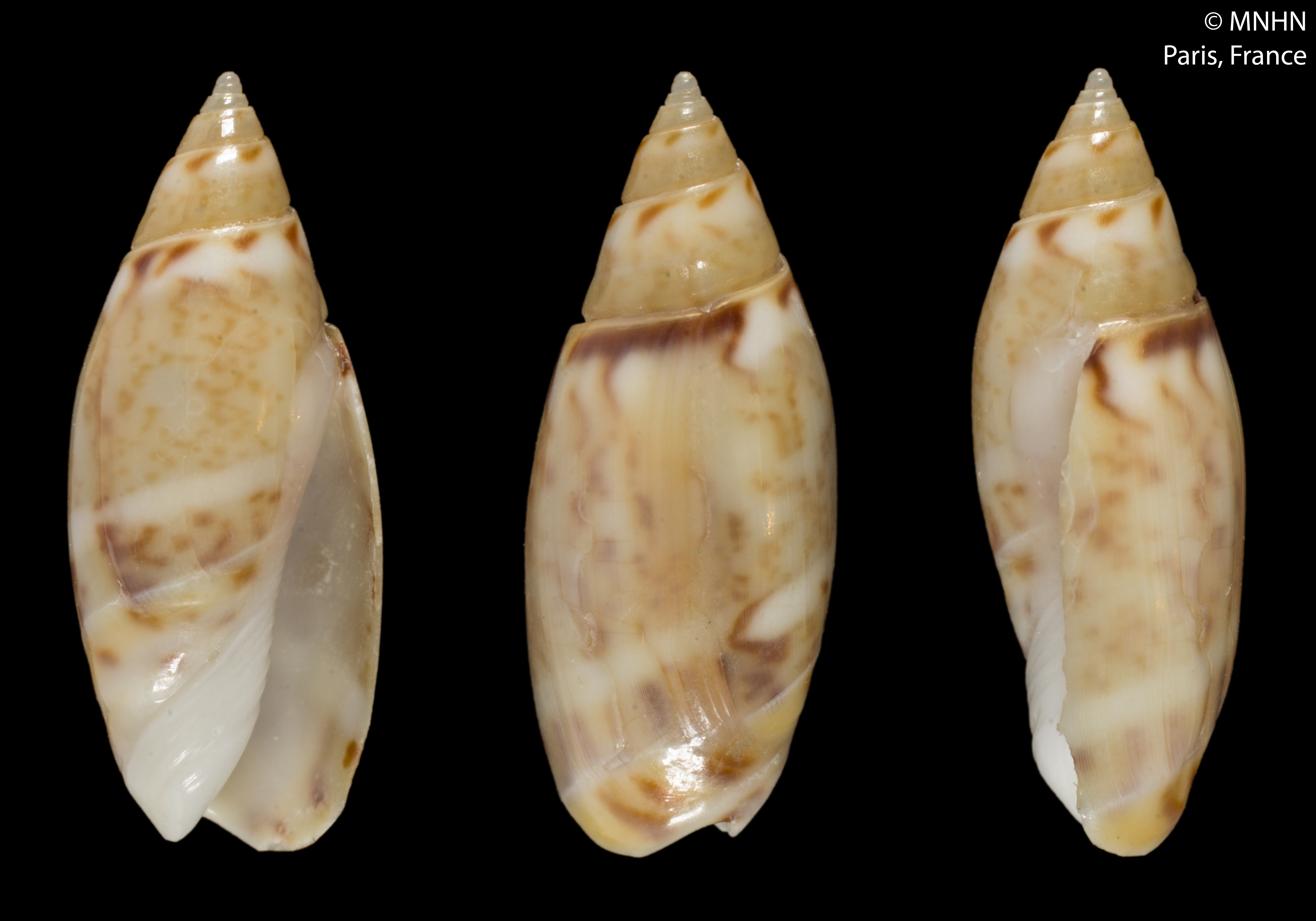
- Shell of Olivella pulchella (syntype at MNHN, Paris)

Scientific classification
- Kingdom: Animalia
- Phylum: Mollusca
- Class: Gastropoda
- Subclass: Caenogastropoda
- Order: Neogastropoda
- Superfamily: Olivoidea
- Family: Olividae
- Subfamily: Olivellinae
- Genus: Olivella
- Species: O. pulchella

Binomial name
- Olivella pulchella (Duclos, 1835)

Synonyms
- Oliva leucozonias J.E. Gray, 1839; Oliva pulchella Duclos, 1835 (original combination); Olivella pulchella pulchella (Duclos, 1835)

= Olivella pulchella =

Species of mollusc

Olivella pulchella is a species of small sea snail, marine gastropod mollusk in the subfamily Olivellinae, in the family Olividae, the olives. Species in the genus Olivella are commonly called dwarf olives.

== Subspecies ==
- Olivella pulchella oteroi Bermejo, 1979: synonym of Olivella oteroi Bermejo, 1979
- Olivella pulchella pulchella (Duclos, 1835) accepted as Olivella pulchella (Duclos, 1835)

== Description ==
The length of the shell varies between 9.3 mm and 11.2 mm.

== Distribution ==
This marine species occurs off Senegal.
