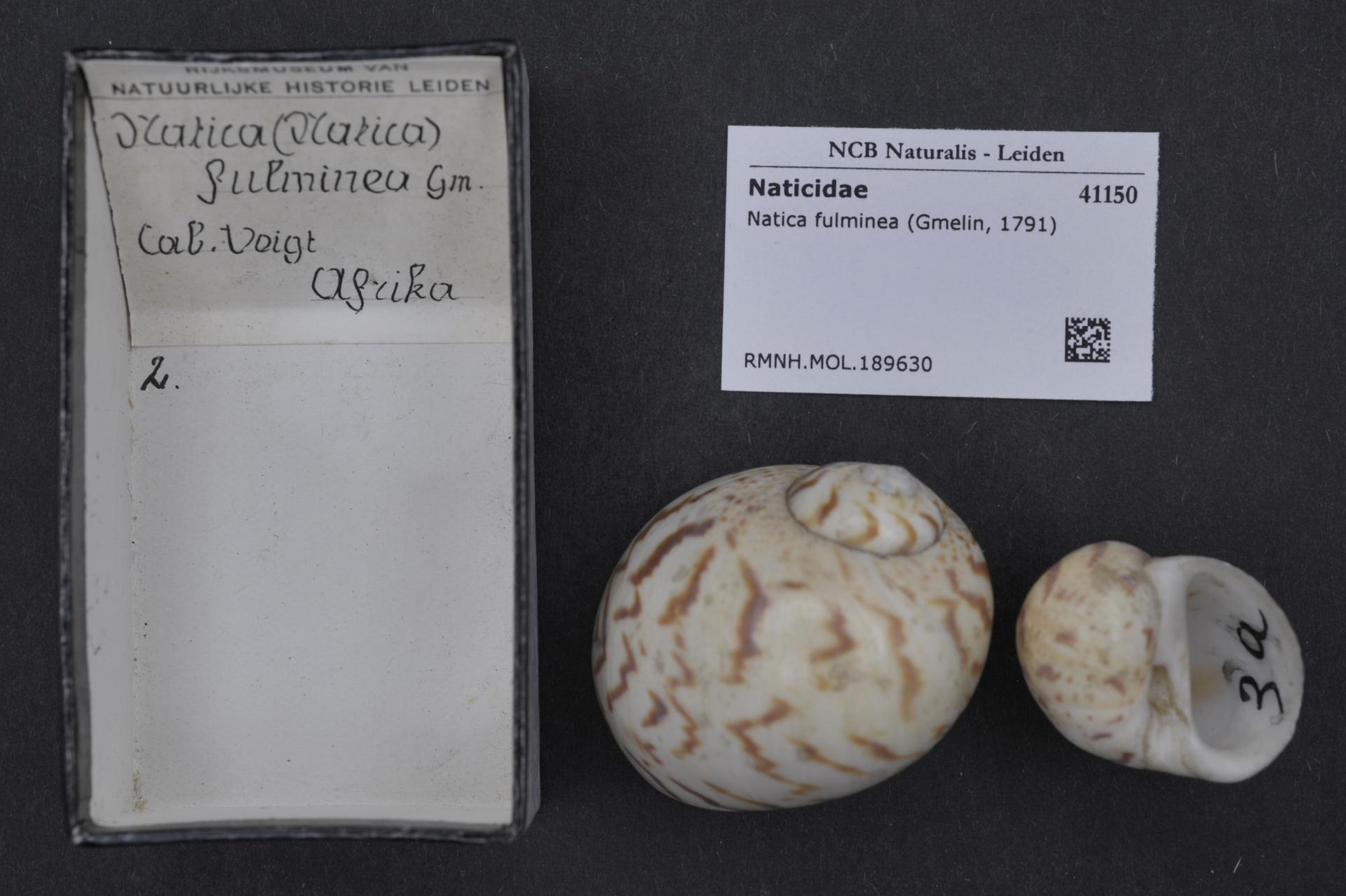

Scientific classification
- Kingdom: Animalia
- Phylum: Mollusca
- Class: Gastropoda
- Subclass: Caenogastropoda
- Order: Littorinimorpha
- Family: Naticidae
- Genus: Natica
- Species: N. fulminea

Binomial name
- Natica fulminea (Gmelin, 1791)

Synonyms
- Cochlis ziczac Röding, P.F., 1798; Nacca fulminea (Gmelin, 1791); Nacca fulminea f. cruentata (Gmelin, 1791); Natica bourguignati Récluz, 1852; Natica cruentata (Gmelin, 1791); Natica fulminea cruentata (Gmelin, 1791); Natica senegalensis Récluz, 1850; Nerita cruentata Gmelin, 1791; Nerita fulminea Gmelin, 1791 (original combination)

= Natica fulminea =

Species of gastropod

Natica fulminea, common name the lightning moon snail, is a species of predatory sea snail, a marine gastropod mollusk in the family Naticidae, the moon snails.

== Description ==
The size of the shell varies between 18 mm and 35 mm.

== Distribution ==
This species occurs in the Atlantic Ocean off Gabon, the Western Sahara and Angola.
