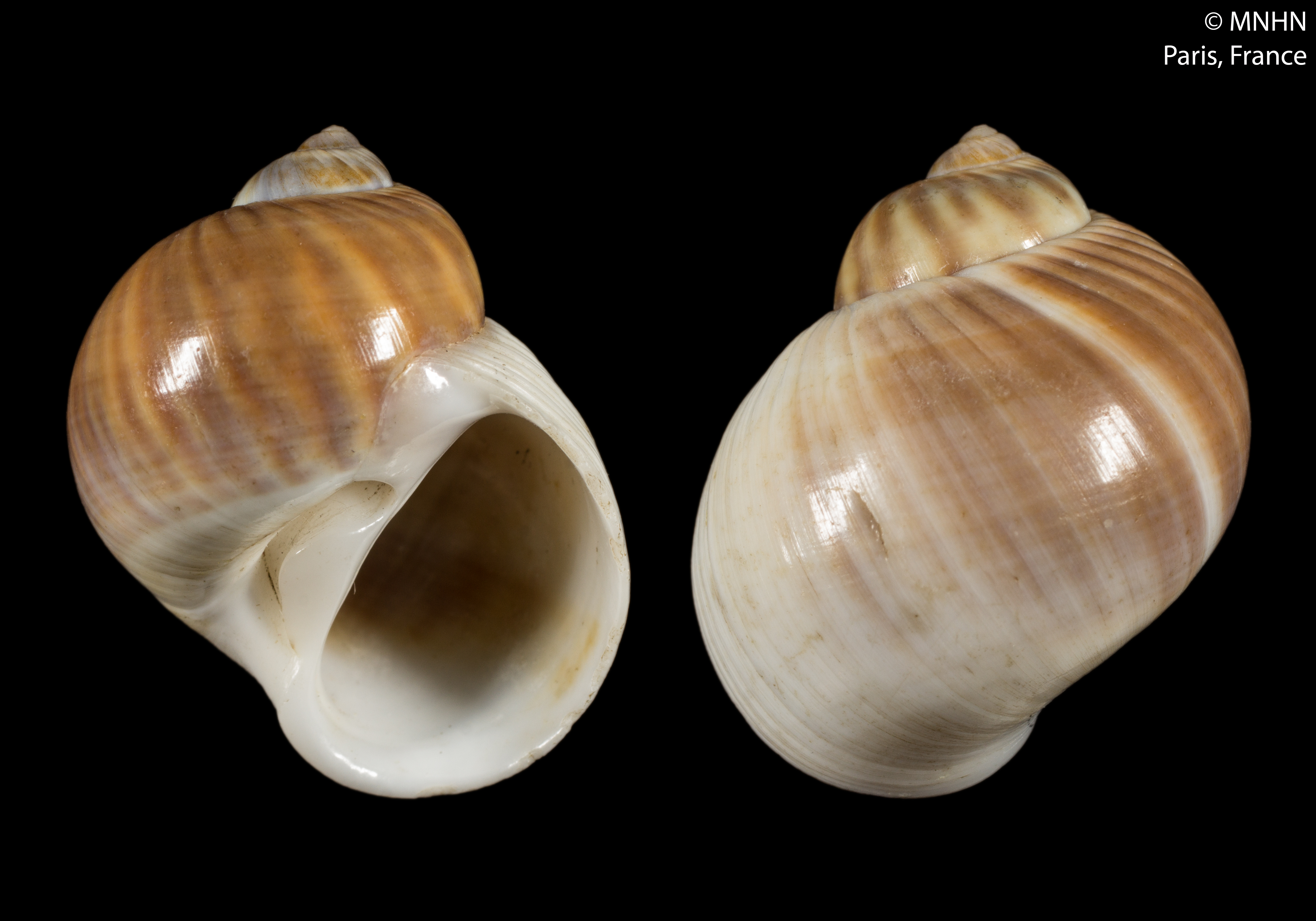
- Shell of Natica marochiensis (syntype at MNHN. Paris)

Scientific classification
- Kingdom: Animalia
- Phylum: Mollusca
- Class: Gastropoda
- Subclass: Caenogastropoda
- Order: Littorinimorpha
- Family: Naticidae
- Genus: Natica
- Species: N. marochiensis

Binomial name
- Natica marochiensis (Gmelin, 1791)

Synonyms
- Natica lemniscata Philippi, 1852; Natica limacina Jousseaume, 1874; Natica lurida Philippi, 1836; Natica maroccana (Chemnitz, 1781) (unavailable name, originally published in a work rejected under ICZN Direction 1); Naticarius marochiensis (Gmelin, 1791); Nerita maroccana Chemnitz, 1781 (unavailable name, published in a work rejected under ICZN Direction 1; available from Gmelin, 1791 as Nerita marochiensis); Nerita marochiensis Gmelin, 1791 (basionym); Notocochlis marochiensis (Gmelin, 1791); Tanea lemniscata (Philippi, 1851)

= Natica marochiensis =

Species of gastropod

Natica marochiensis is a species of predatory sea snail, a marine gastropod mollusk in the family Naticidae, the moon snails.

== Distribution ==
This marine species has a wide distribution. It can be found at the following locations:

- Mediterranean Sea
- Atlantic Ocean : Cape Verde, West Africa, Angola
- Caribbean Sea
- Gulf of Mexico
- Lesser Antilles
- Indian Ocean : Mozambique

== Description ==
The maximum recorded shell length is 40 mm.

(Described as Natica lemniscata) The shell is subglobose and thin, possessing a tawny color. It is decorated with three narrow white zones and marked by longitudinal, flexuous red lines, while arched chestnut lines further ornament the zones. A broad white band encircles the umbilicus and is adorned at its margin with chestnut, arrow-shaped spots.

The whorls are rounded and feature radial grooves at the suture. The spire is short, and the aperture is semiorbicular, being produced into an angle at the base. A large callus fills the greater part of the umbilicus and is encircled on the exterior by a superficial groove.

== Habitat ==
Minimum recorded depth is 0 m. Maximum recorded depth is 94 m.
