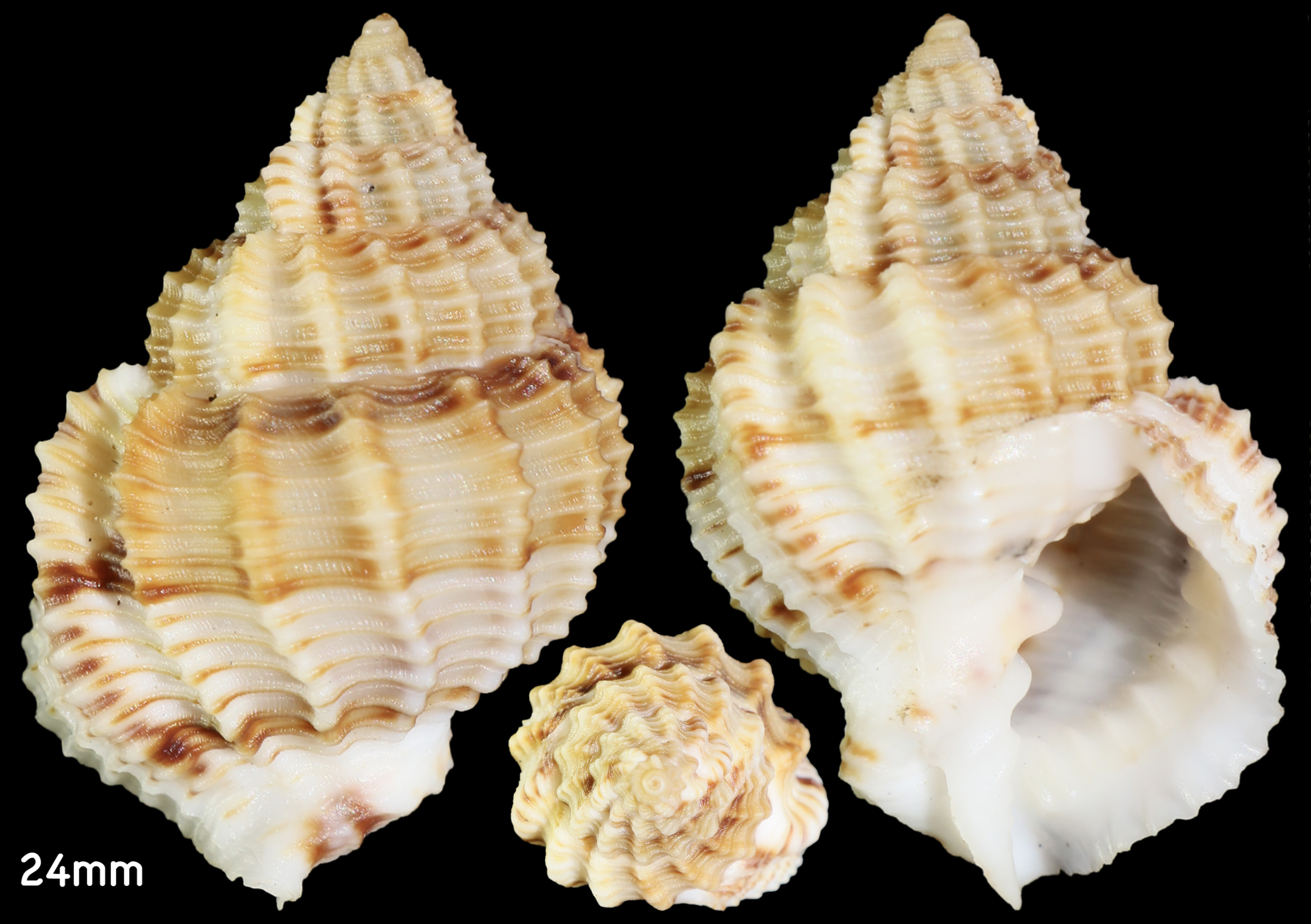

Scientific classification
- Kingdom: Animalia
- Phylum: Mollusca
- Class: Gastropoda
- Subclass: Caenogastropoda
- Order: Neogastropoda
- Family: Cancellariidae
- Genus: Bivetiella
- Species: B. similis

Binomial name
- Bivetiella similis (Sowerby G.B. I, 1833)

= Bivetiella similis =

Species of gastropod

Bivetiella similis is a species of sea snail, a marine gastropod mollusk in the family Cancellariidae, the nutmeg snails.

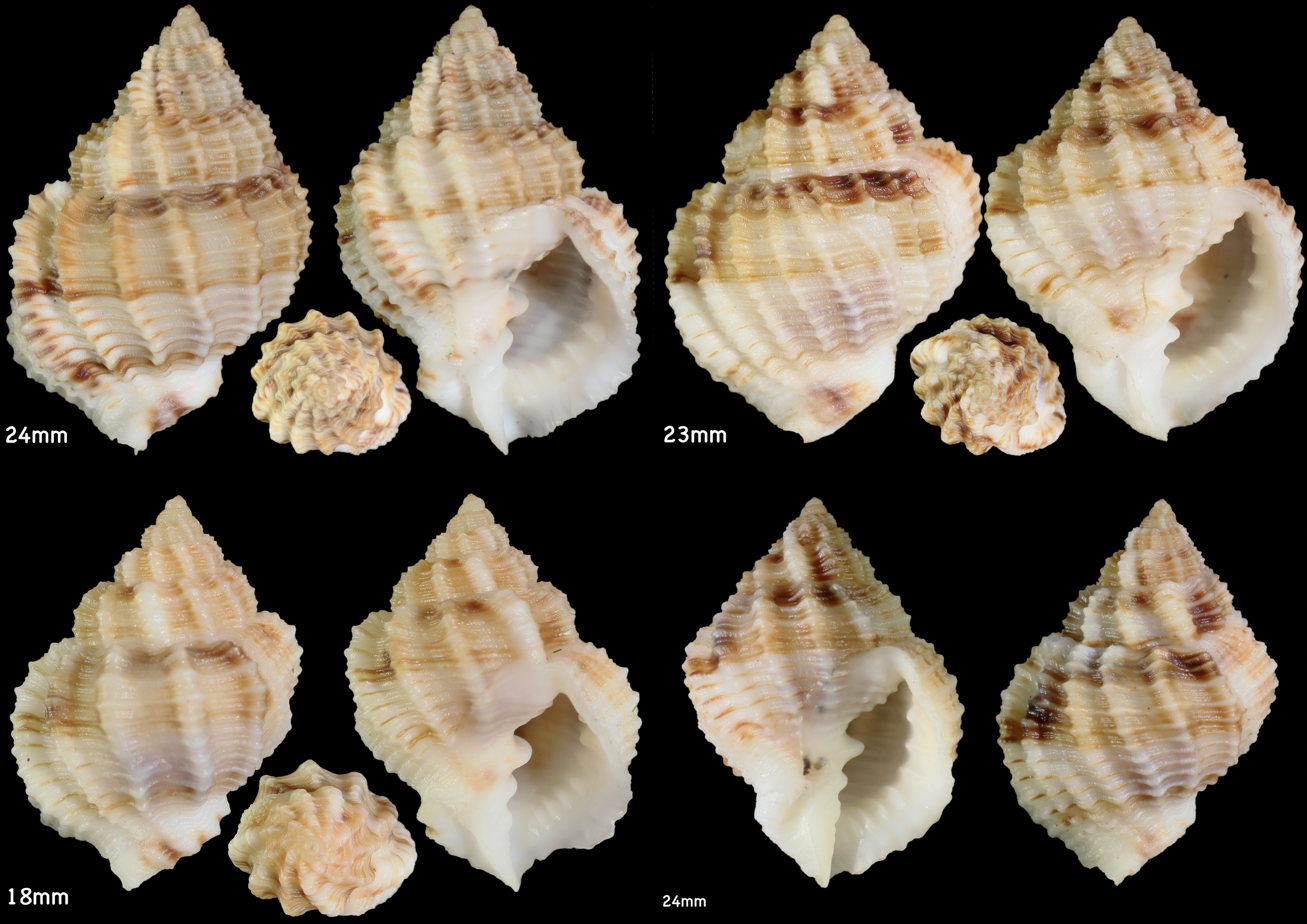
Bivetiella similis (G. B. Sowerby I, 1833) Tenerife, Canary Islands.
