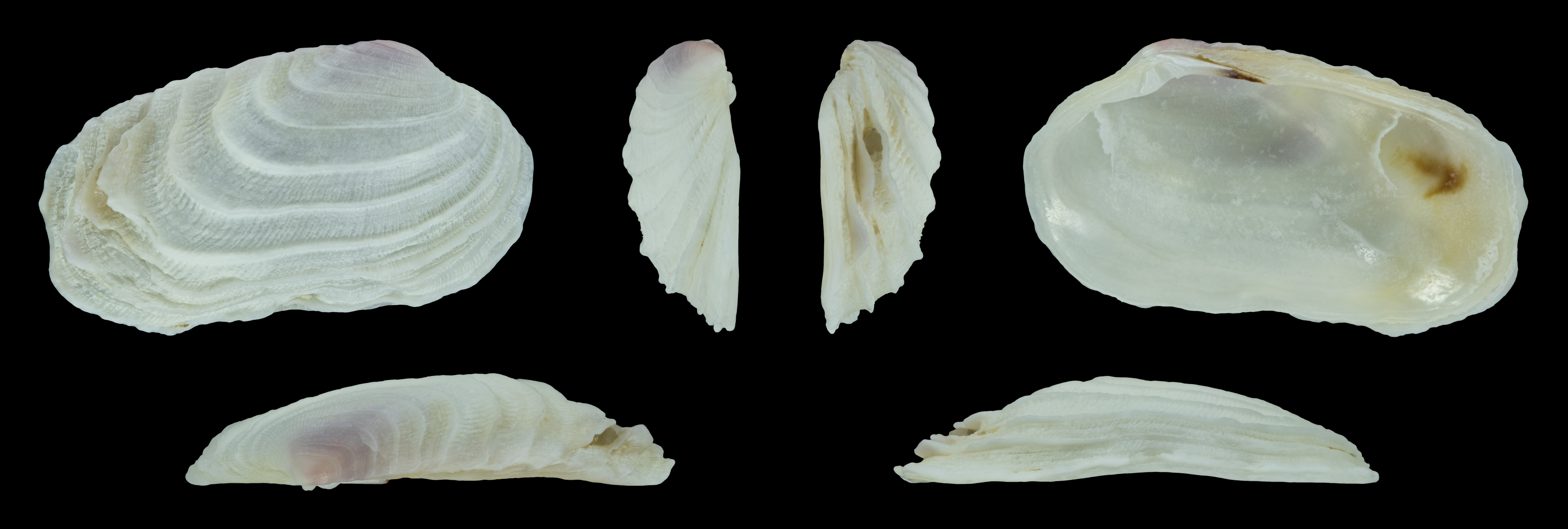

Scientific classification
- Kingdom: Animalia
- Phylum: Mollusca
- Class: Bivalvia
- Order: Venerida
- Family: Veneridae
- Genus: Irus
- Species: I. irus

Binomial name
- Irus irus (Linnaeus, 1758)

Synonyms
- Donax irus Linnaeus, 1758

= Irus irus =

Species of bivalve

Irus irus, also known as the irus clam, is a species of bivalve belonging to the family Veneridae.

The species is found in the Northeast Atlantic, in the Mediterranean, and in the Indo-Pacific.

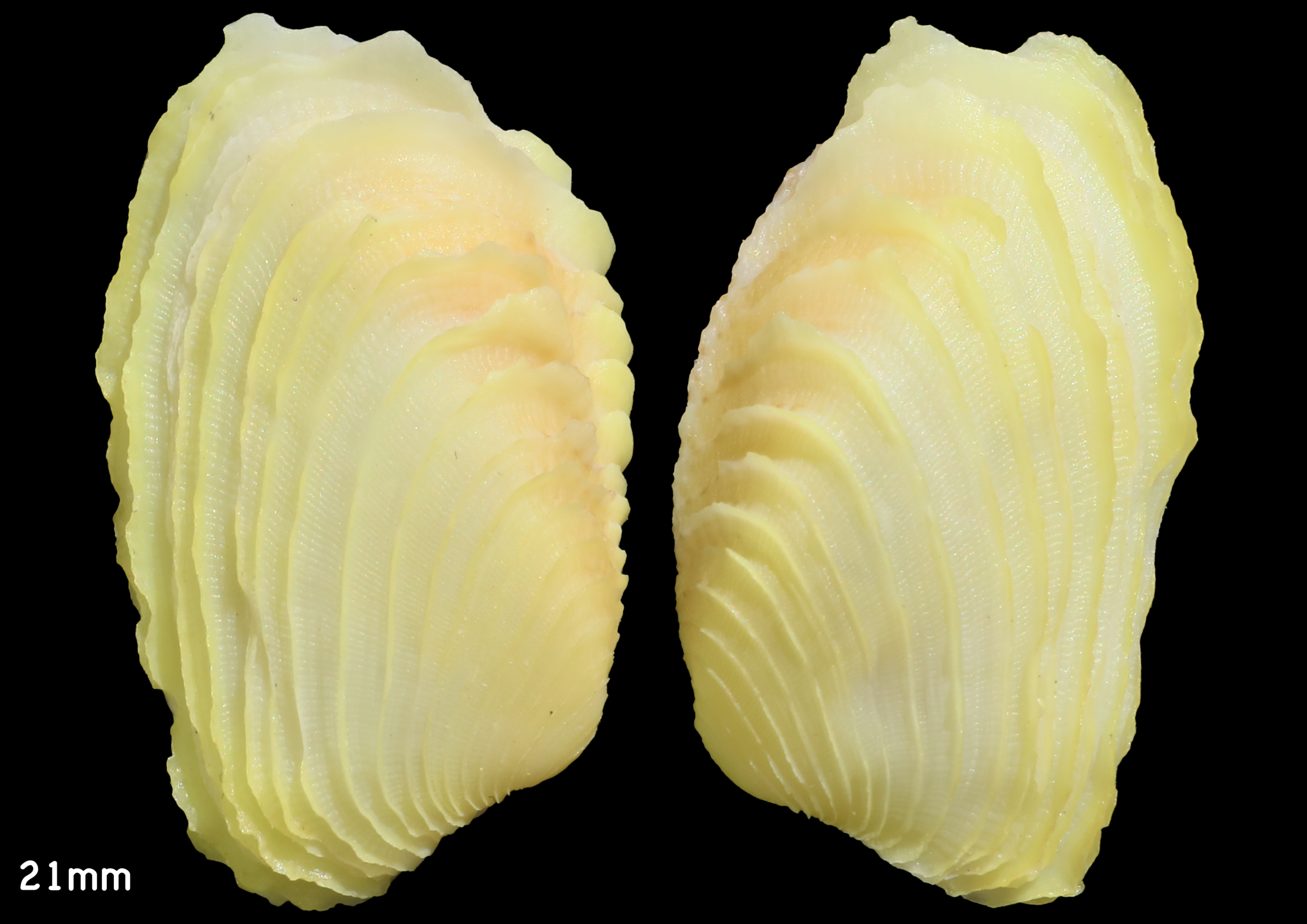

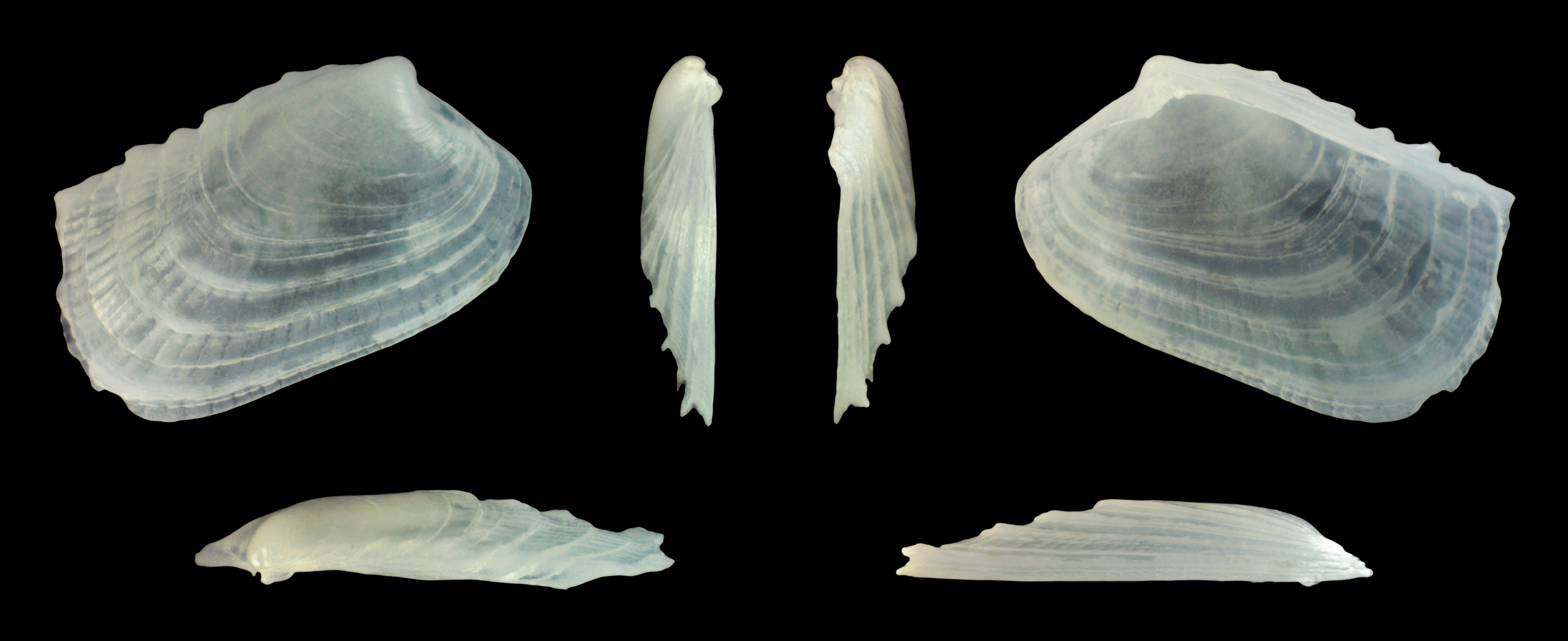
Juvenile

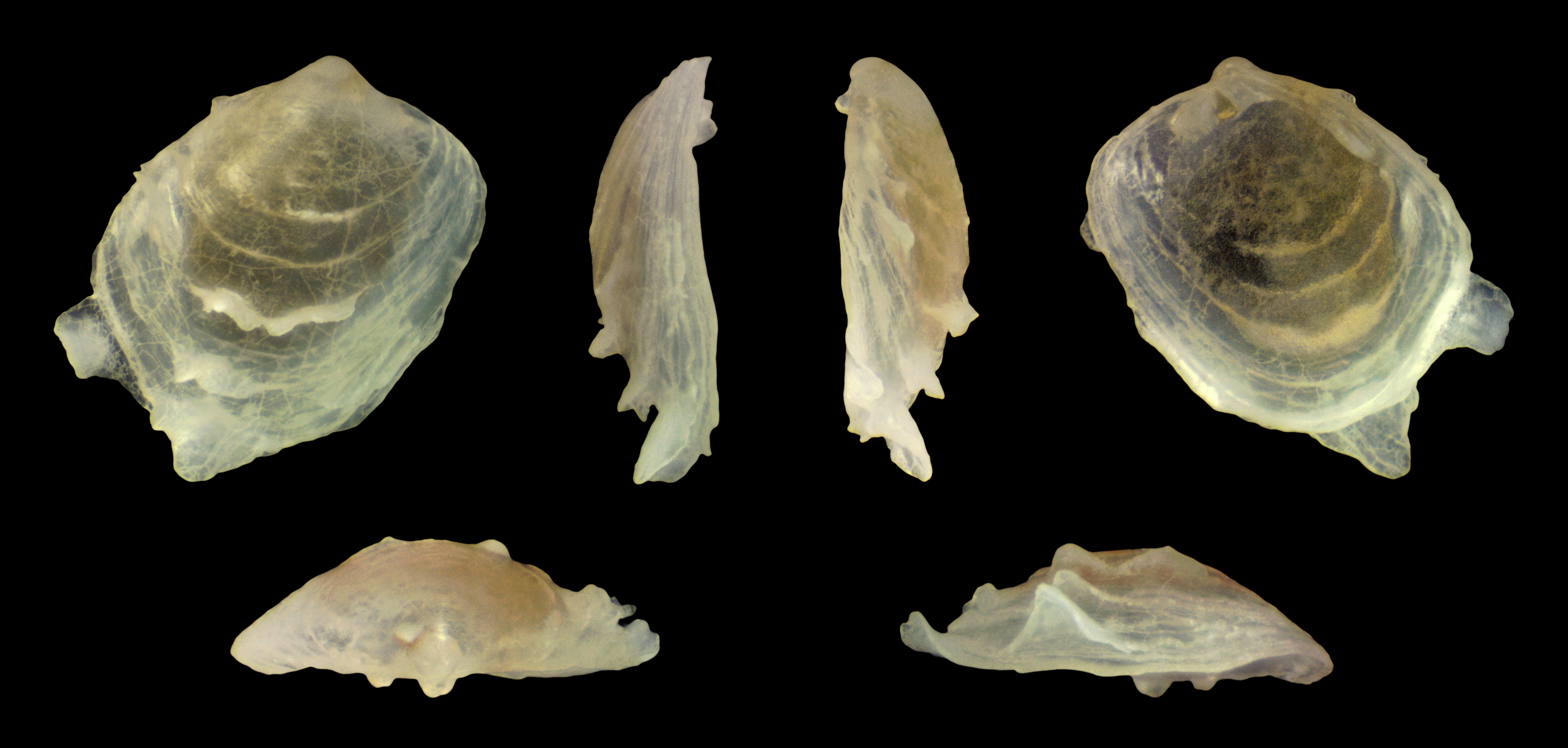
var. crebrilamellata, juvenile
