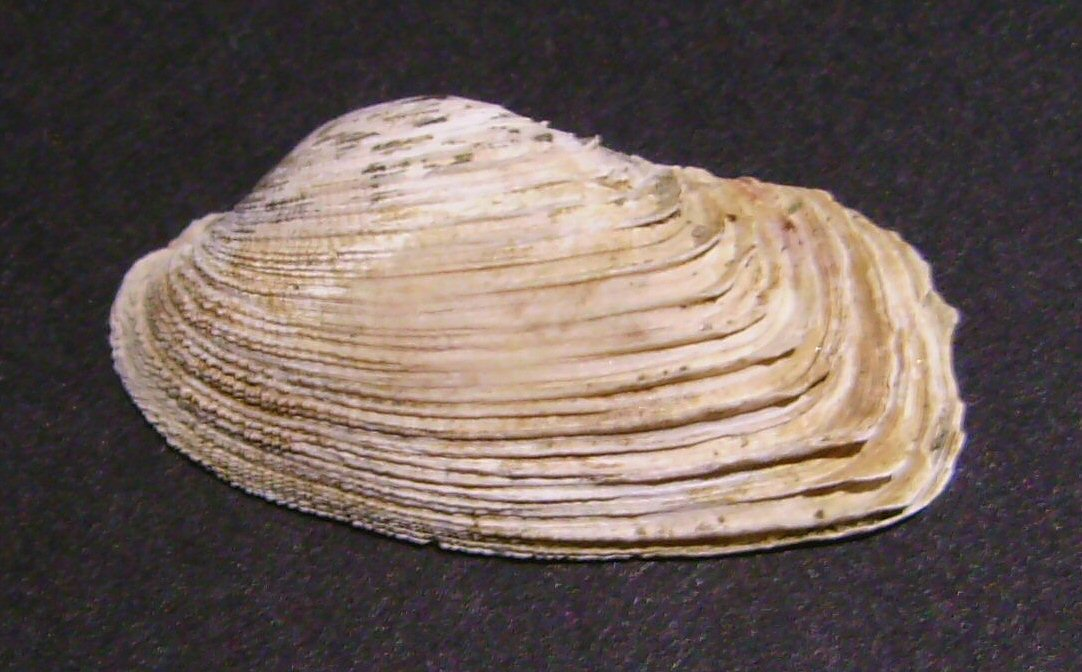
- Irus elegans

Scientific classification
- Kingdom: Animalia
- Phylum: Mollusca
- Class: Bivalvia
- Order: Venerida
- Family: Veneridae
- Genus: Irus; Schmidt, 1818

Species
- See text

Synonyms
- Irona Finlay, 1926; Irus (Irus) F. C. Schmidt, 1818; Irus (Notirus) Finlay, 1928; Irus (Notopaphia) W. R. B. Oliver, 1923; Notirus Finlay, 1928; Notopaphia W. R. B. Oliver, 1923

= Irus (bivalve) =

Genus of bivalves

Irus is a genus of saltwater clams, marine bivalve molluscs in the family Veneridae, the venus clams.

== Species in the genus Irus ==
Species recognized as of October 2021:

- Irus carditoides (Lamarck, 1818)
- Irus caudex (Laws, 1936) †
- Irus crenatus (Lamarck, 1818)
- Irus cumingii (Deshayes, 1854)
- Irus elegans (Deshayes, 1854)
- Irus exoticus (Lamarck, 1818)
- Irus interstriatus (G. B. Sowerby II, 1854)
- Irus irus (Linnaeus, 1758)
- Irus ishibashianus Kuroda & Habe, 1952
- Irus macrophylla (Deshayes, 1853)
- Irus mitis (Deshayes, 1854)
- Irus reflexus (Gray, 1843)
- Irus vertumnalium (Melvill, 1918)
