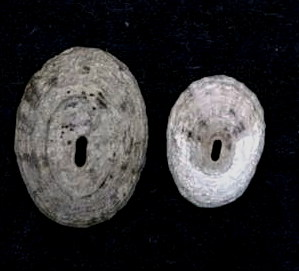
- Top view and basal view of a shell of Fissurella coarctata (museum specimens at Naturalis Biodiversity Center)

Scientific classification
- Kingdom: Animalia
- Phylum: Mollusca
- Class: Gastropoda
- Subclass: Vetigastropoda
- Order: Lepetellida
- Family: Fissurellidae
- Genus: Fissurella
- Species: F. coarctata

Binomial name
- Fissurella coarctata King, 1832

Synonyms
- Fissurella taeniata Sowerby, G.B. II, 1867

= Fissurella coarctata =

Species of gastropod

Fissurella coarctata, also known as the compressed keyhole limpet, is a species of marine gastropod in the family Fissurellidae, the keyhole limpets.

== Description ==
The size of the shell attains 40 mm.

== Distribution ==
This species occurs in the Atlantic Ocean off Cape Verde and Senegal.
