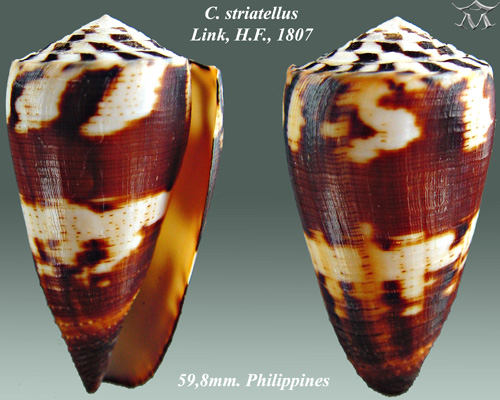
- Apertural and abapertural views of shell of Conus striatellus Link, H.F., 1807
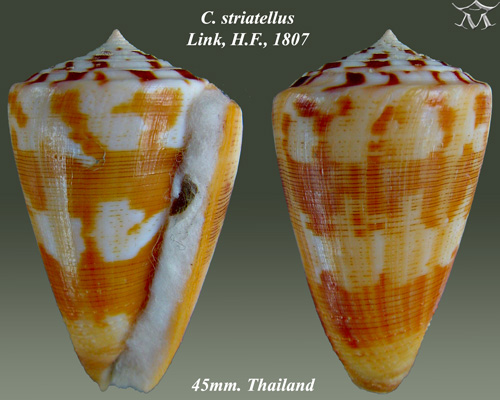

Conservation status
- Least Concern (IUCN 3.1)

Scientific classification
- Domain: Eukaryota
- Kingdom: Animalia
- Phylum: Mollusca
- Class: Gastropoda
- Subclass: Caenogastropoda
- Order: Neogastropoda
- Superfamily: Conoidea
- Family: Conidae
- Genus: Conus
- Species: C. striatellus

Binomial name
- Conus striatellus Link, 1807

Synonyms
- Conus (Strategoconus) striatellus Link, 1807 · accepted, alternate representation; Conus lictor Boivin, 1864; Conus lineatus Hwass in Bruguière, 1792 (invalid: junior homonym of Conus lineatus Solander, 1766 (a fossil); C. pulchrelineatus is a replacement name); Conus lineatus granulosus Barros e Cunha, 1933; Conus pulchrelineatus Hopwood, 1921; Vituliconus striatellus (Link, 1807)

= Conus striatellus =

Species of sea snail

Conus striatellus is a species of sea snail, a marine gastropod mollusk in the family Conidae, the cone snails and their allies.

Like all species within the genus Conus, these snails are predatory and venomous. They are capable of stinging humans, therefore live ones should be handled carefully or not at all.

== Description ==
Thick shell is cylindrically turbinated, somewhat inflared, and varies in length between 25 mm and 90 mm. The spire is of varying height (mostly short), and with distant, spiral ridges on the lower half of the body whorl. The whole surface is distantly encircled by granular striae. The colouration is variable: often creamy orange, variously painted with chestnut longitudinal irregular streaks, usually forming three broad series or bands, zigzagging lines on upper part of body whorl and spire, and with brown bands across central and lower half of body whorl; or pale orange with white shoulder mottling and a central band. The aperture is bluish white.

== Distribution ==
This species occurs in the Red Sea, in the Indian Ocean off Tanzania, Madagascar, Aldabra; in the Indo-Western Pacific; off Indo-China, Indo-Malaysia, New Caledonia, Fiji, Vanuatu and Australia (Western Australia).
