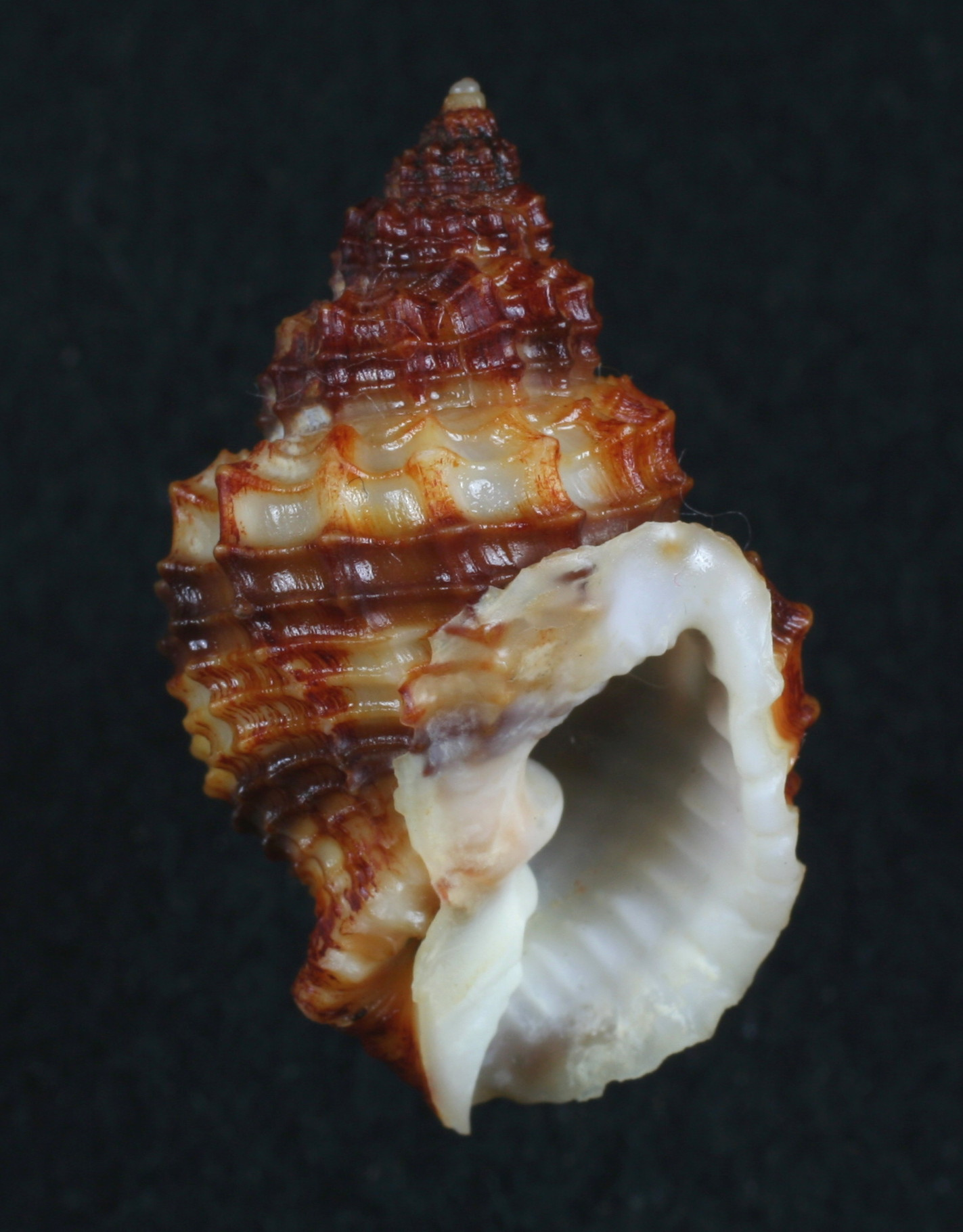
- Apertural view of shell of Bivetiella cancellata (Linnaeus, 1767)

Scientific classification
- Kingdom: Animalia
- Phylum: Mollusca
- Class: Gastropoda
- Subclass: Caenogastropoda
- Order: Neogastropoda
- Family: Cancellariidae
- Genus: Bivetiella
- Species: B. cancellata

Binomial name
- Bivetiella cancellata (Linnaeus, 1767)

Synonyms
- Buccinella rotundata Perry, G., 1811; Buccinum pyrozonias Gmelin, 1791; Cancellaria (Cancellaria) cancellata (Linnaeus, 1767); Cancellaria (Cancellaria) cancellata var. elongata Kobelt, 1904; Cancellaria cancellata (Linnaeus, 1767); Cancellaria cancellata var. elongata Kobelt, 1904; Cancellaria cancellata var. infracosticillata Sacco, 1894; Cancellaria cancellata var. minor Almera & Bofill, 1884; Cancellaria costata Sowerby, G.B. I, 1822; Cantharus triplicatus Röding, P.F., 1798; Murex scabriculus Linnaeus, 1758 (Declared nomen oblitum under ICZN Art. 23.9 by Verhecken (2007)); Murex scabriusculus Linnaeus, 1767; Voluta cancellata Linnaeus, 1767

= Bivetiella cancellata =

Species of gastropod

Bivetiella cancellata is a species of sea snail, a marine gastropod mollusk in the family Cancellariidae, the nutmeg snails.

== Description ==
The shell size varies between 20 mm and 50 mm.

== Distribution ==
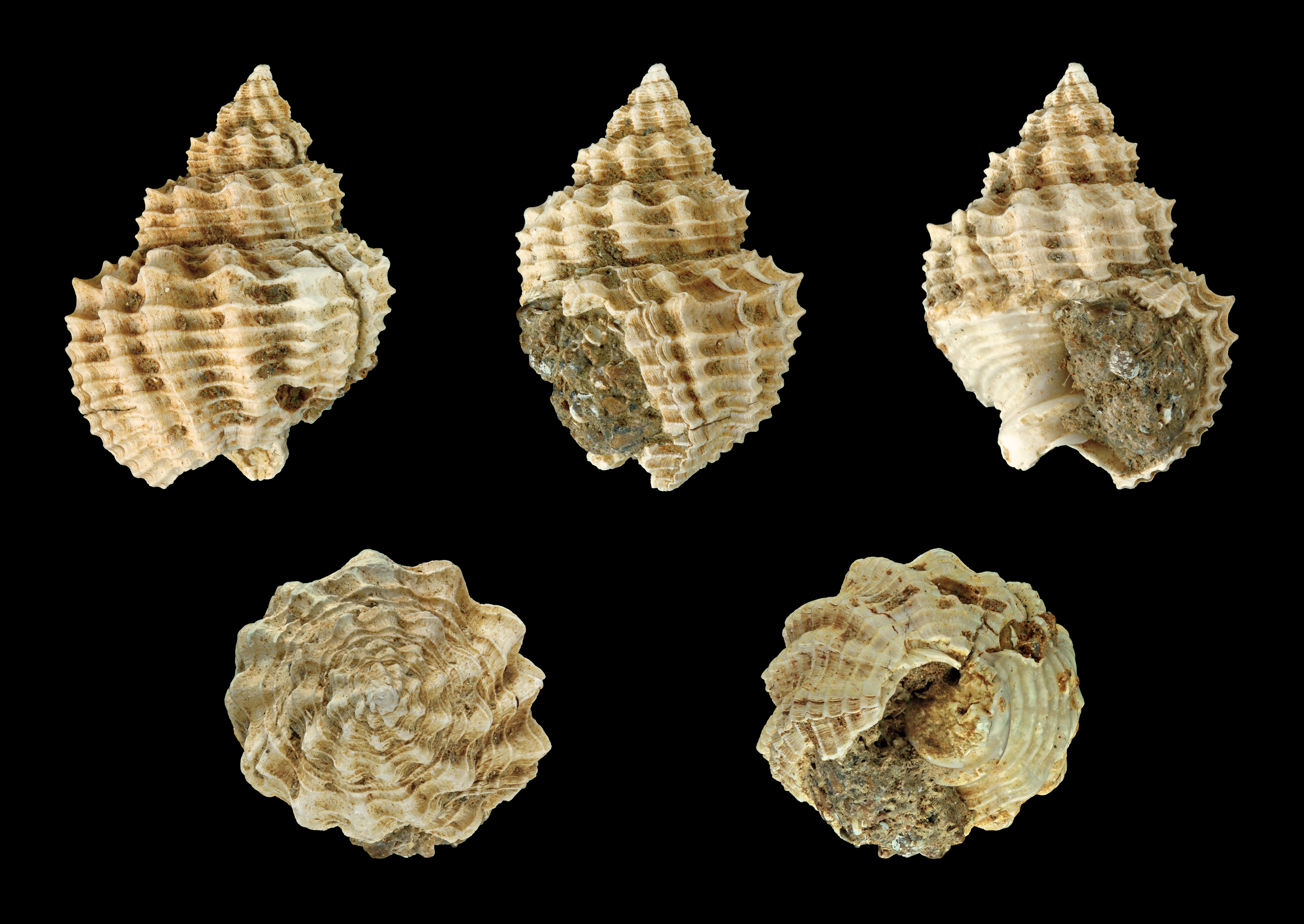
A fossil specimen from the Pliocene of Italy

This species occurs in European waters, the Mediterranean Sea and in the Atlantic Ocean off the Canary Islands, Cape Verde, West Africa, and Angola.
