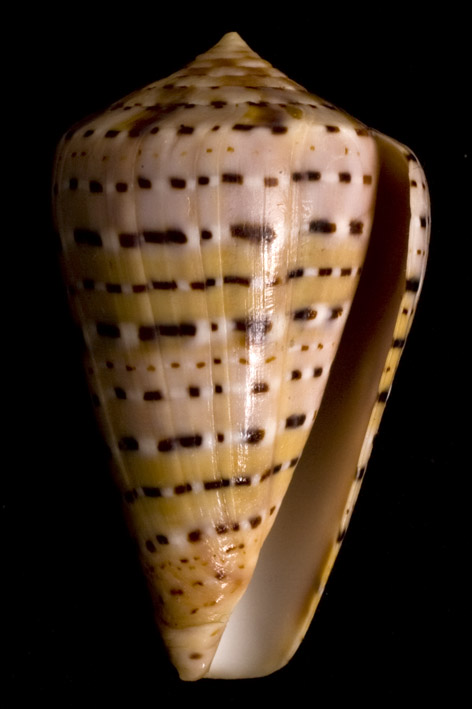
- Apertural view of a shell of Conus genuanus

Conservation status
- Least Concern (IUCN 3.1)

Scientific classification
- Kingdom: Animalia
- Phylum: Mollusca
- Class: Gastropoda
- Subclass: Caenogastropoda
- Order: Neogastropoda
- Superfamily: Conoidea
- Family: Conidae
- Genus: Conus
- Species: C. genuanus

Binomial name
- Conus genuanus Linnaeus, 1758

Synonyms
- Conus (Kalloconus) genuanus Linnaeus, 1758 · accepted, alternate representation; Conus fasciatus Perry, 1811; Conus genuanus var. papilio Linnaeus, 1767; Conus papilio Linnaeus, C., 1767; Conus sphinx Röding, P.F., 1798; Cucullus papilio Röding, 1798; Cucullus sphinx Röding, 1798; Genuanoconus genuanus (Linnaeus, 1758)

= Conus genuanus =

Species of sea snail

Conus genuanus, common name the garter cone, is a species of sea snail, a marine gastropod mollusk in the family Conidae, the cone snails and their allies.

Like all species within the genus Conus, these snails are predatory and venomous. They are capable of stinging humans, therefore live ones should be handled carefully or not at all.

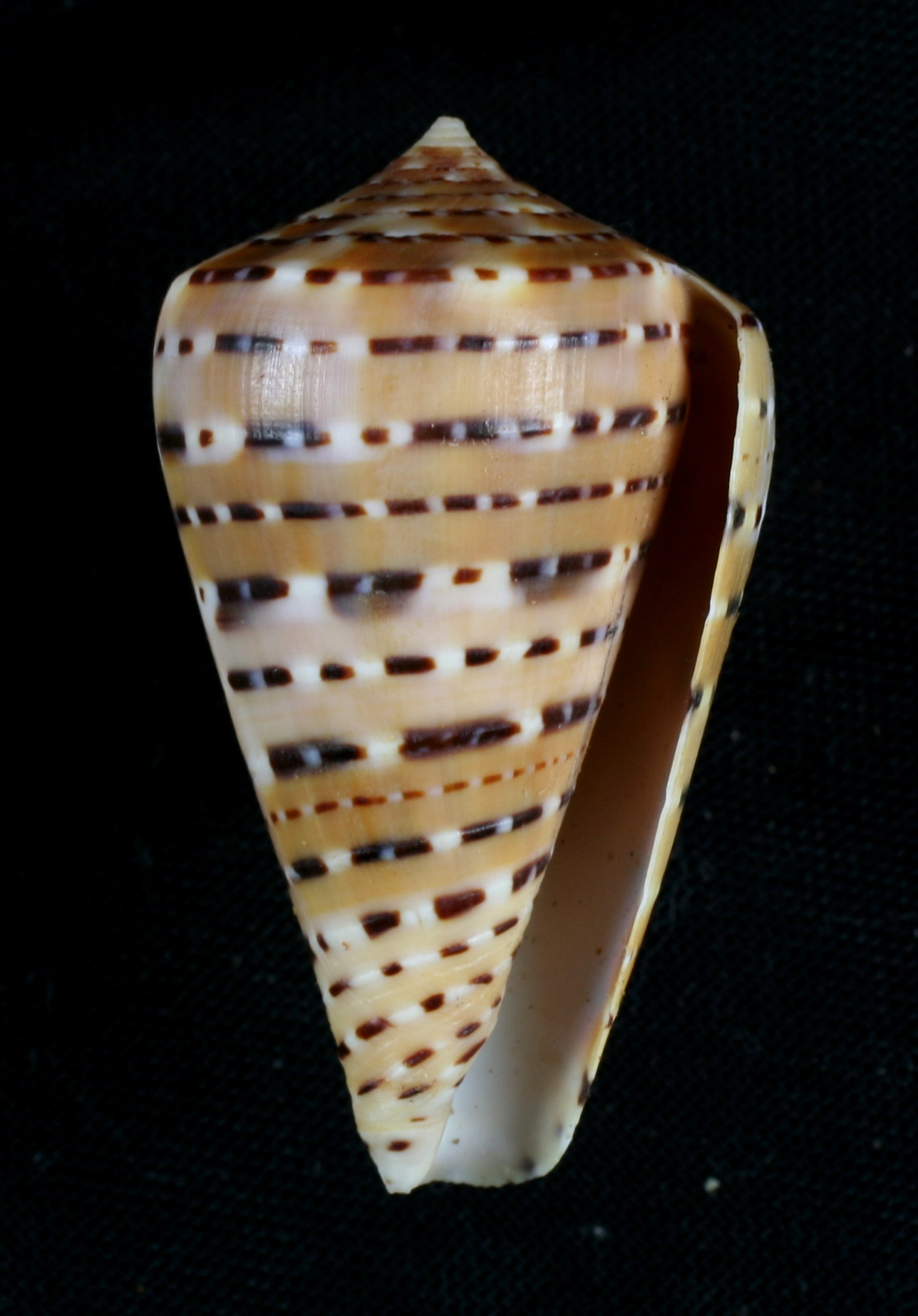
Apertural view of a shell of Conus genuanus Linnaeus, 1758, measuring 49.1 mm, collected in West Africa.

== Description ==
The size of an adult shell varies between 33 mm and 75 mm. The ground color of the shell is pink-brown or violaceous brown, with revolving narrow lines of alternate white and chocolate quadrangular spots and dashes. These lines are usually alternately larger and smaller. The surface of the shell is usually smooth, but sometimes the lines are slightly elevated. The spire is smooth.

== Distribution and habitat ==
C. genuanus occurs in the Atlantic Ocean from the Canary Islands and Cape Verde to Angola. The species prefers mud and sand at depths of 1–20 m.

== Gallery ==
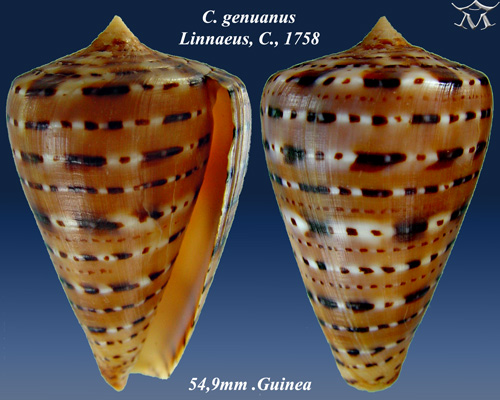
Conus genuanus Linnaeus, C., 1758

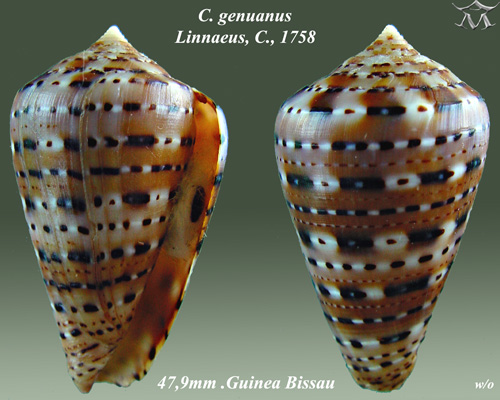
Conus genuanus Linnaeus, C., 1758

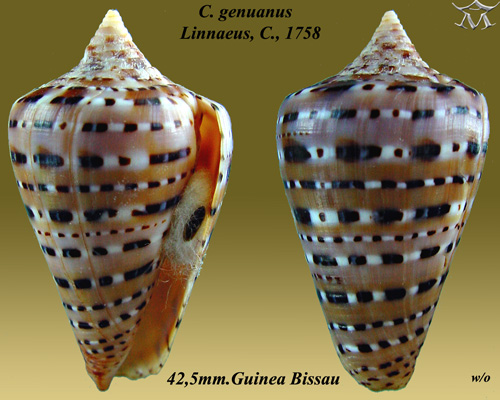
Conus genuanus Linnaeus, C., 1758

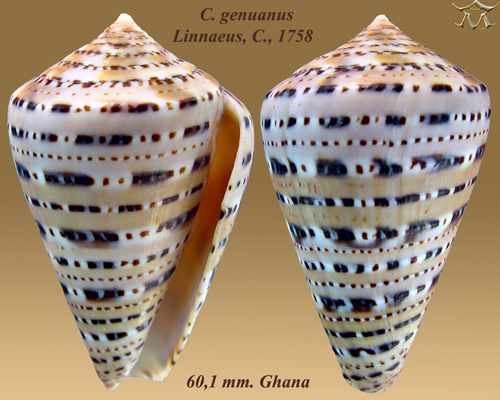
Conus genuanus Linnaeus, C., 1758
