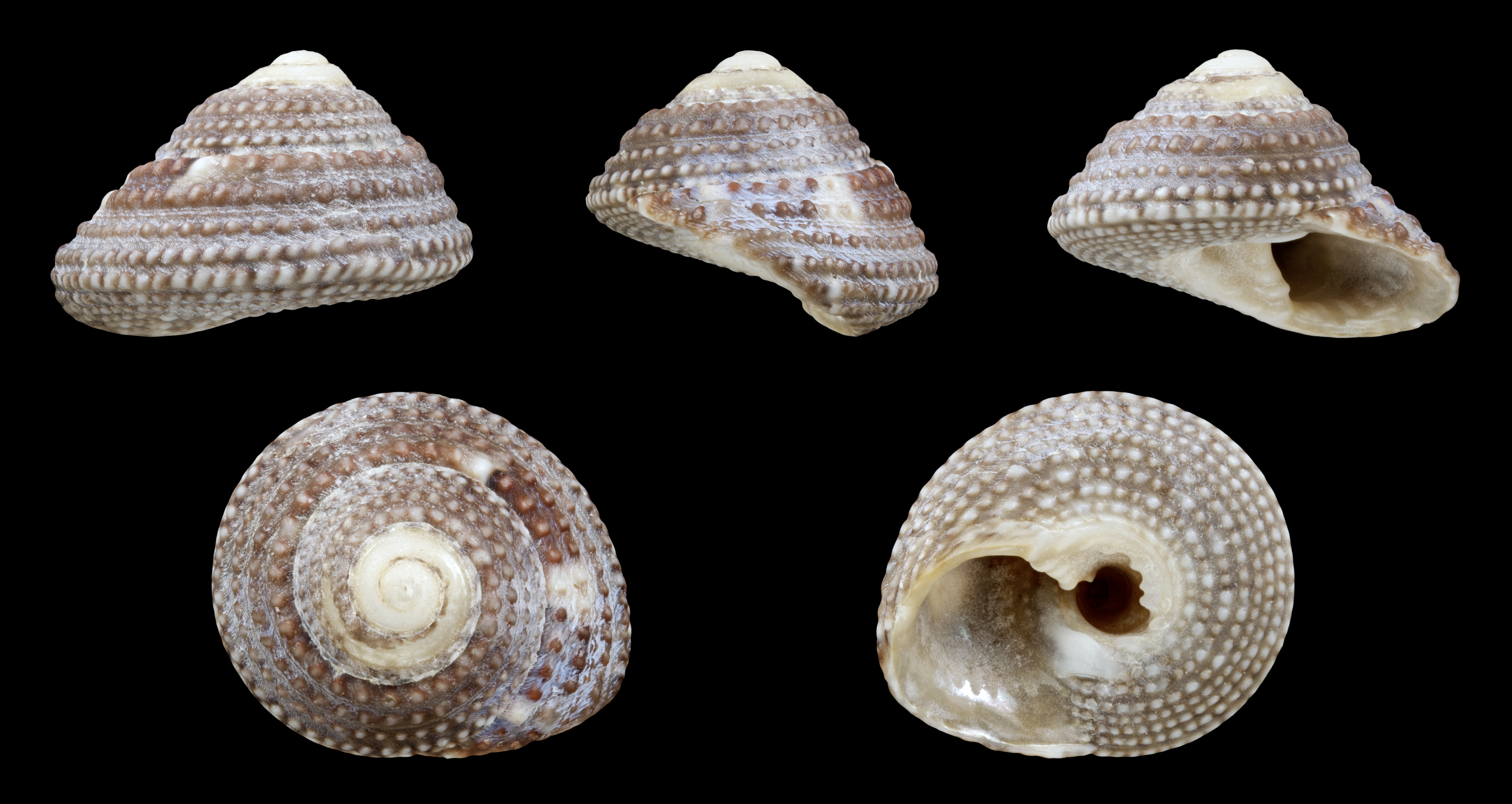
- Shells of Clanculus guineensis

Scientific classification
- Kingdom: Animalia
- Phylum: Mollusca
- Class: Gastropoda
- Subclass: Vetigastropoda
- Order: Trochida
- Superfamily: Trochoidea
- Family: Trochidae
- Genus: Clanculus
- Species: C. guineensis

Binomial name
- Clanculus guineensis (Gmelin, 1791)

Synonyms
- Trochus guineensis Gmelin, 1791

= Clanculus guineensis =

Species of gastropod

Clanculus guineensis is a species of sea snail, a marine gastropod mollusk in the family Trochidae, the top snails.

== Description ==
The size of the shell varies between 15 mm and 25 mm. The very solid shell has a conical shape. It is, rather depressed, angulate at the periphery and deeply umbilicate. Its color is whitish, painted with broad radiating purplish brown stripes above. The base of the shell shows narrow radiating stripes or tessellations of the same shade. The about six whorls are planulate or slightly concave above. The whitish apex is eroded. The succeeding whorls are spirally beaded. The body whorl slightly descends anteriorly, bearing on the upper surface about 7 spiral beaded lirae. The interstices are obliquely finely striate. The base is subplanulate, concentrically sculptured with about 7 or 8 beaded lirae. The rounded aperture is rhomboidal. The outer and basal lips are thick, evenly and finely plicate within. The columella is oblique, deeply entering, conspicuously fielded near its insertion. Its edge is denticulate near the base, and passing into the basal margin with a regular curve. The parietal wall bears a white wrinkled callus, the umbilical margin of which is dentate. The wide umbilicus is deep, scarcely narrowed as it penetrates, bordered by a strong acutely dentate rib.

It differs from the typical forms of Clanculus in lacking the strong tooth at the base of the columella.

== Distribution ==
This species occurs in the Atlantic Ocean off Angola, the Ivory Coast and Gabon.
