= Cyllene desnoyersi =

Scientific classification
- Kingdom: Animalia
- Phylum: Mollusca
- Class: Gastropoda
- Subclass: Caenogastropoda
- Order: Neogastropoda
- Family: Nassariidae
- Genus: Cyllene
- Species: C. desnoyersi

Binomial name
- Cyllene desnoyersi (Basterot, 1825) †

Extinct species of gastropod

Cyllene desnoyersi is a fossil species of sea snail, a marine gastropod mollusk in the family Nassariidae, the Nassa mud snails or dog whelks.

The species contains one subspecies: Cyllene desnoyersi lamarcki (Cernohorsky, 1975, synonyms : Cyllene lamarcki Cernohorsky, 1975; Cyllene lyrata Lamarck, 1822).

== Description ==
The shell grows to a length of 11 mm.

== Distribution ==
The species is distributed in the Atlantic Ocean along Gabon and Angola.
