= Species affinis =

Taxonomic term

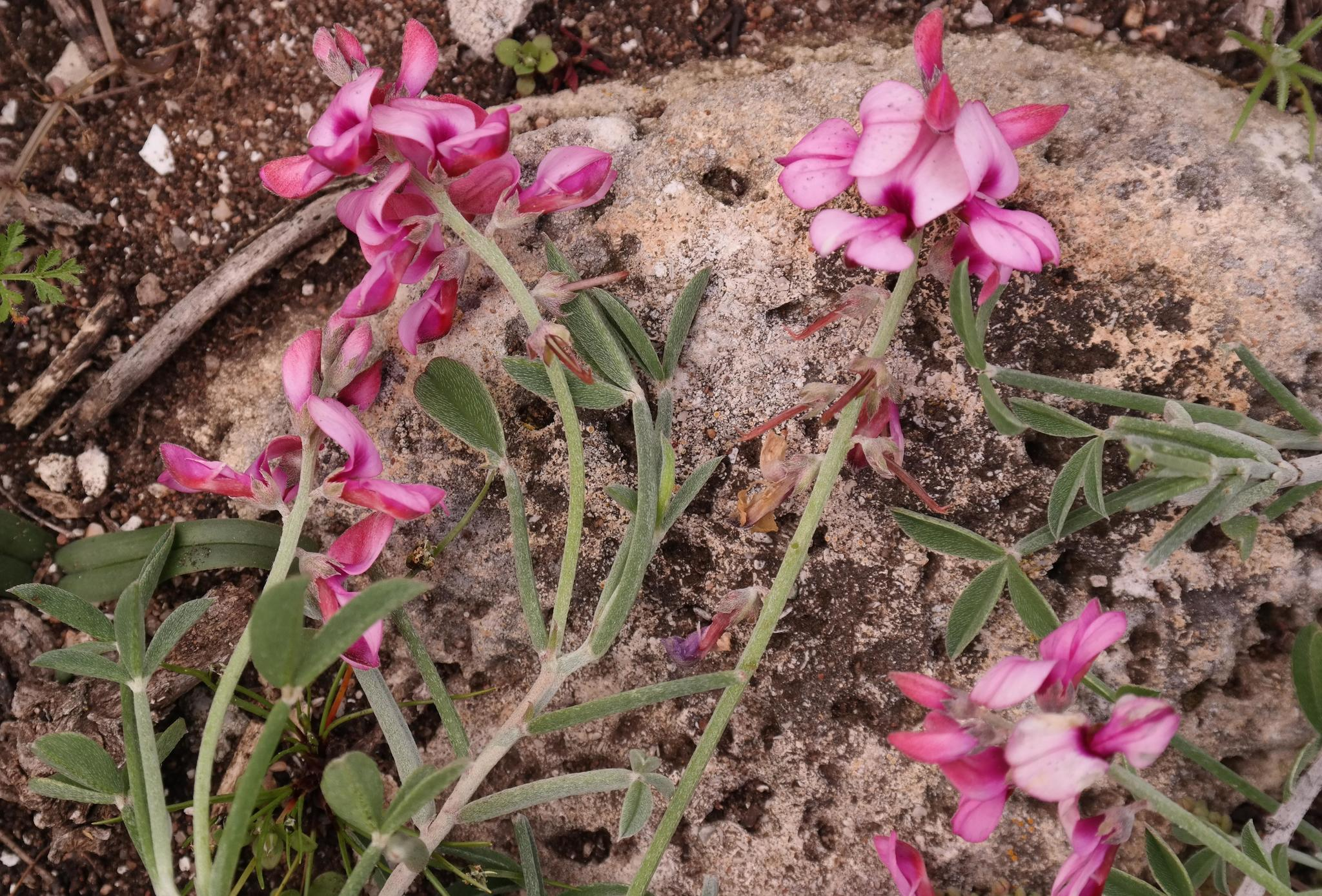
Plant identified as Indigofera sp. aff. platypoda having an affinity for Indigofera platypoda

Species affinis (commonly abbreviated to: sp., aff., or affin.) is taxonomic terminology in zoology and botany. In open nomenclature it indicates that available material or evidence suggests that the proposed species is related to, has an affinity to, but is not identical to, the species with the binomial name it comes after. The Latin word affinis can be translated as "closely related to", or "akin to".

An author who inserts n.sp., or sp. nov., aff before a species name thereby states the opinion that the specimen is a new, previously undescribed species, but that there may not (yet) be enough information to complete a formal description. To use aff. alone, implies that the specimen differs suggestively from the holotype but that further progress is necessary to confirm that it is a novel species.

An example would be: a gastropod shell listed as Lucapina aff. L. aegis would mean that this shell somewhat resembles the shell of Lucapina aegis, but is thought more likely to be another species, either closely related to, or closely resembling Lucapina aegis. In a suitable context it also may suggest the possibility that the shell belongs to a species that has not yet been described.

Within entomology, species proxima (Latin: 'the nearest species', abbreviated prox. or sp. prox.) and species near (abbreviated nr. or sp. nr.) indicate a specimen is similar to, but distinct from, a described species.

The use of aff. is similar to other indicators of open nomenclature such as cf., sp., or ?, but the latter indicate that the species is uncertain rather than undescribed.

== See also ==
- Glossary of scientific names
- List of classical abbreviations
- List of Latin abbreviations
- List of Latin and Greek words commonly used in systematic names
