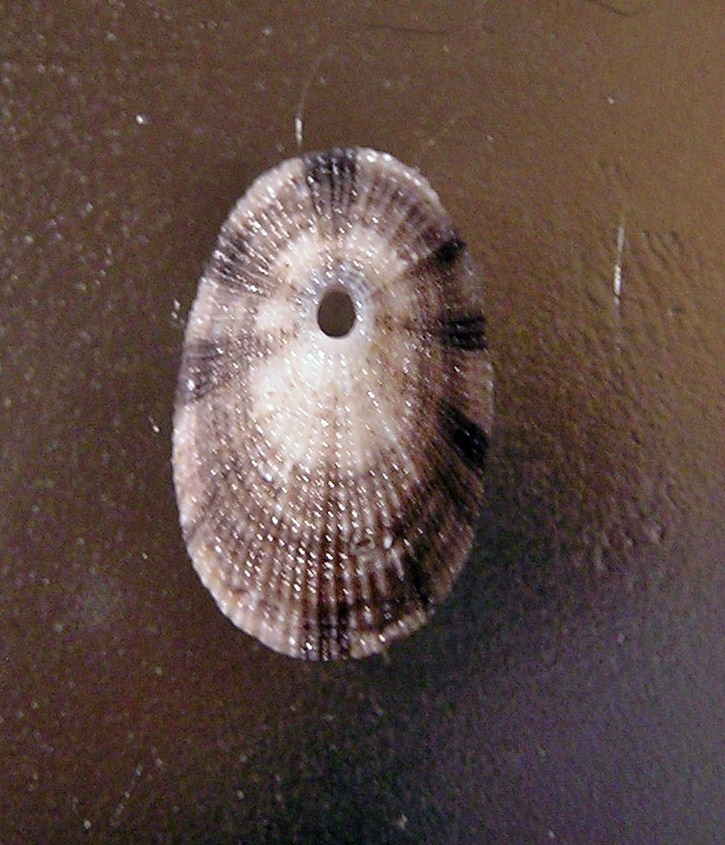
- Dorsal view of a shell of Diodora inaequalis

Scientific classification
- Kingdom: Animalia
- Phylum: Mollusca
- Class: Gastropoda
- Subclass: Vetigastropoda
- Order: Lepetellida
- Family: Fissurellidae
- Subfamily: Fissurellinae
- Genus: Diodora
- Species: D. inaequalis

Binomial name
- Diodora inaequalis (G.B. Sowerby, 1835)

= Diodora inaequalis =

Species of gastropod

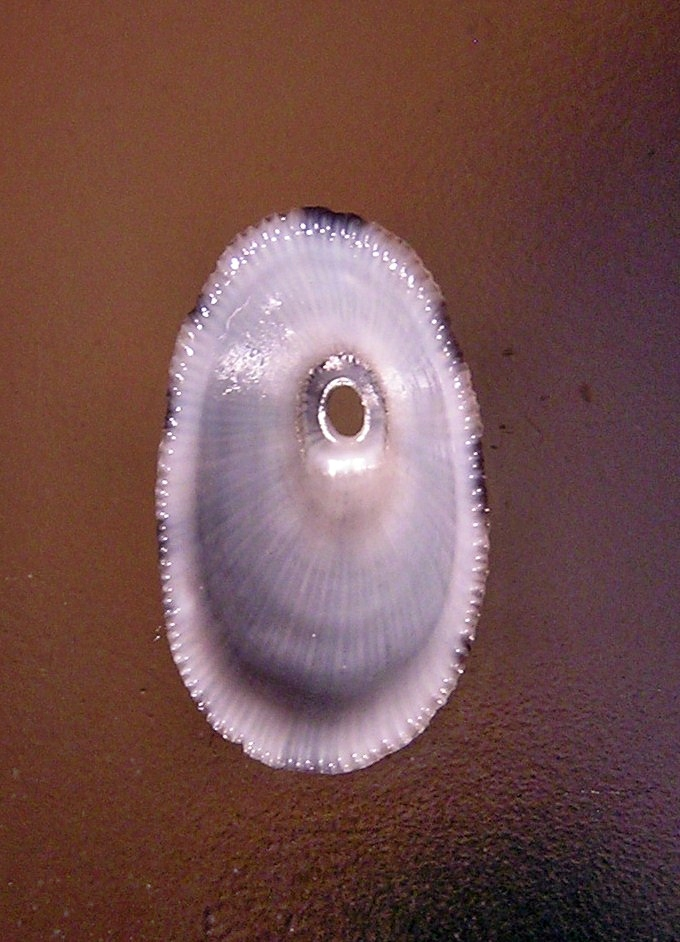
Ventral view of a shell of Diodora inaequalis

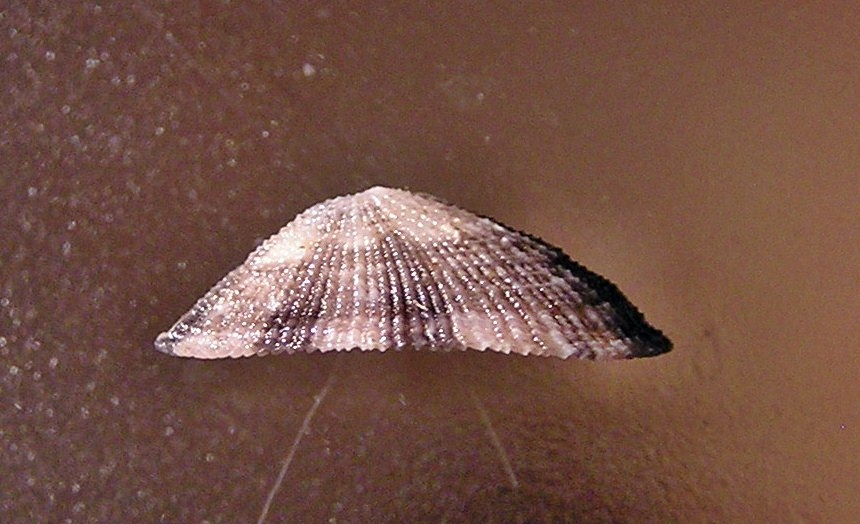
Lateral view of a shell of Diodora inaequalis

Diodora inaequalis is a species of sea snail, a marine gastropod mollusk in the family Fissurellidae, the keyhole limpets and slit limpets.
