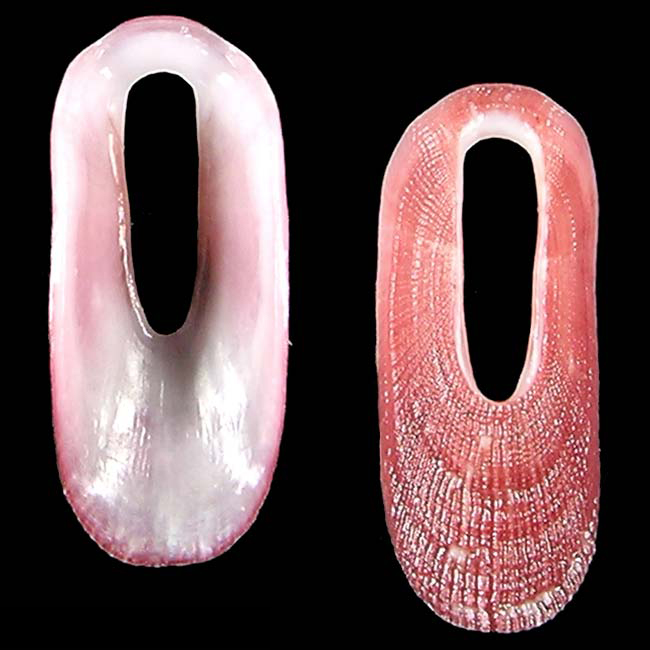
- Shell of Macroschisma rubrum

Scientific classification
- Kingdom: Animalia
- Phylum: Mollusca
- Class: Gastropoda
- Subclass: Vetigastropoda
- Order: Lepetellida
- Family: Fissurellidae
- Subfamily: Fissurellinae
- Genus: Macroschisma
- Species: M. rubrum

Binomial name
- Macroschisma rubrum Poppe, Tagaro & Stahlschmidt, 2015

Synonyms
- Macroschisma rubra [sic] (wrong gender agreement of specific epithet)

= Macroschisma rubrum =

Species of gastropod

Macroschisma rubrum is a species of sea snail, a marine gastropoda mollusk in the family Fissurellidae.

== Distribution ==
The length of the shell varies between 14 mm and 21 mm.

== Taxonomy ==
The species was originally referred to as Macroschisma rubra, but this was an incorrect gender agreement. The accepted name is now Macroschisma rubrum, with rubra treated as an incorrect subsequent spelling.

== Distribution ==
This marine species occurs off the Philippines, including Mactan and Bohol.
