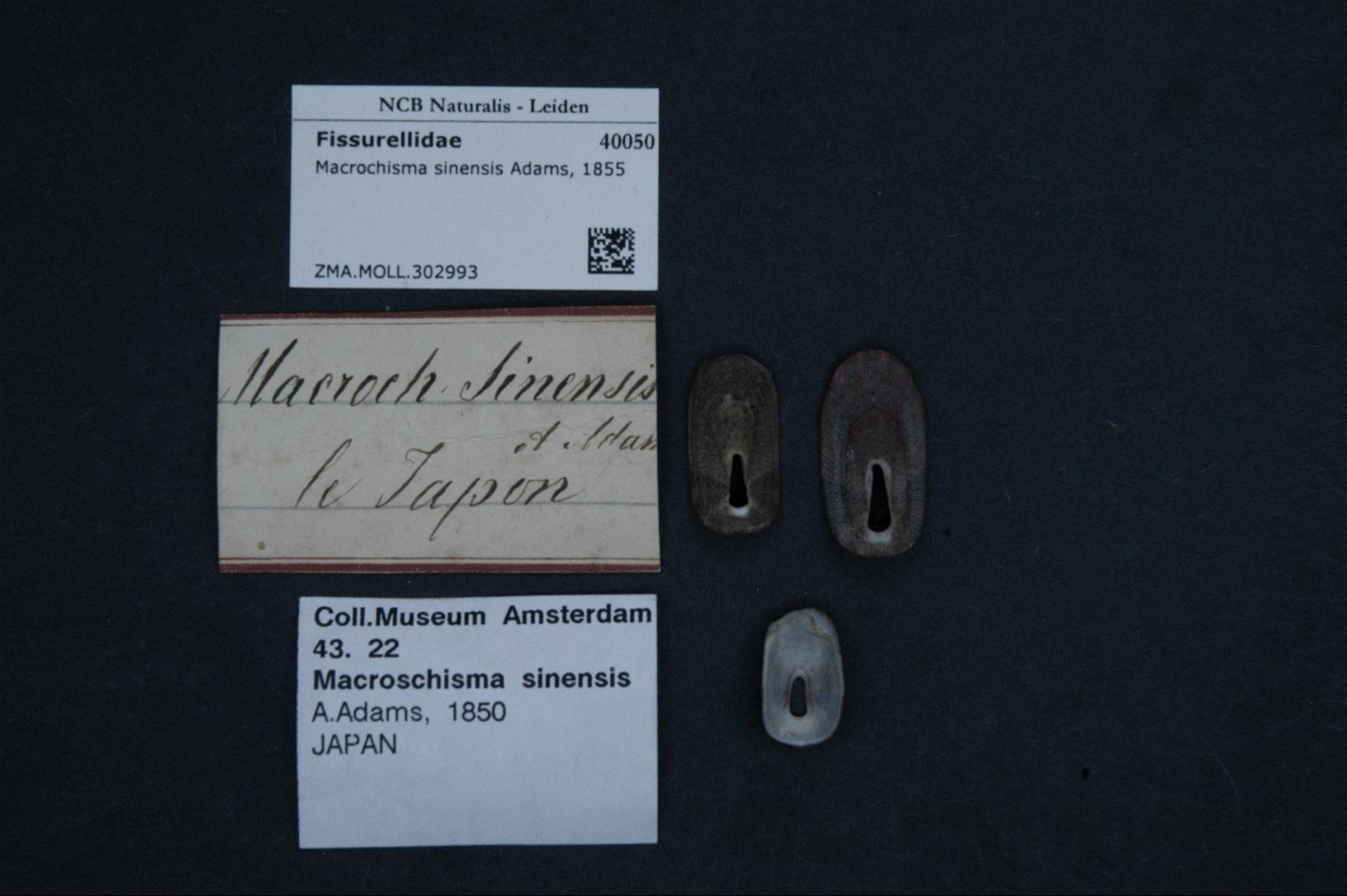

Scientific classification
- Kingdom: Animalia
- Phylum: Mollusca
- Class: Gastropoda
- Subclass: Vetigastropoda
- Order: Lepetellida
- Family: Fissurellidae
- Subfamily: Fissurellinae
- Genus: Macroschisma
- Species: M. sinense

Binomial name
- Macroschisma sinense A. Adams, 1855

Synonyms
- Macroschisma sinensis [sic] (incorrect gender ending)

= Macroschisma sinense =

Species of gastropod

Macroschisma sinense is a species of sea snail, a marine gastropod mollusk in the family Fissurellidae, the keyhole limpets and slit limpets.

== Distribution ==
This species occurs in the following locations:

- Red Sea
