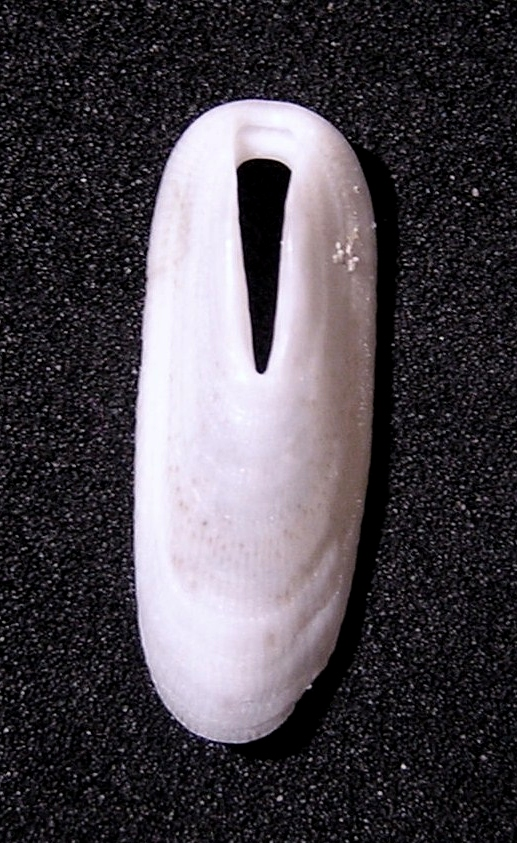
- Top view of a shell of Macroschisma productum

Scientific classification
- Kingdom: Animalia
- Phylum: Mollusca
- Class: Gastropoda
- Subclass: Vetigastropoda
- Order: Lepetellida
- Family: Fissurellidae
- Subfamily: Fissurellinae
- Genus: Macroschisma
- Species: M. productum

Binomial name
- Macroschisma productum Adams, 1850

Synonyms
- Macrochisma producta Adams, 1851 (basionym); Macroschisma producta [sic] (incorrect gender ending)

= Macroschisma productum =

Species of gastropod

Macroschisma productum, common name the elongated keyhole limpet, is a species of sea snail, a marine gastropod mollusk in the family Fissurellidae, the keyhole limpets and slit limpets.

== Description ==
The length of the shell varies between 22 mm and 40 mm.

== Distribution ==
This marine species occurs in the following locations:

- Madagascar
- New South Wales, Victoria, South Australia, Western Australia and Tasmania.
