= Macroschisma megatrema =

Scientific classification
- Kingdom: Animalia
- Phylum: Mollusca
- Class: Gastropoda
- Subclass: Vetigastropoda
- Order: Lepetellida
- Family: Fissurellidae
- Subfamily: Fissurellinae
- Genus: Macroschisma
- Species: M. megatrema

Binomial name
- Macroschisma megatrema Adams, 1851

Synonyms
- Macrochisma megatrema Adams, 1851 (basionym); Macroschisma magathura [sic] (misspelling)

Species of gastropod

Macroschisma megatrema is a species of sea snail, a marine gastropod mollusk in the family Fissurellidae, the keyhole limpets and slit limpets.

== Distribution ==
This species occurs off the following locations:

- Aldabra
