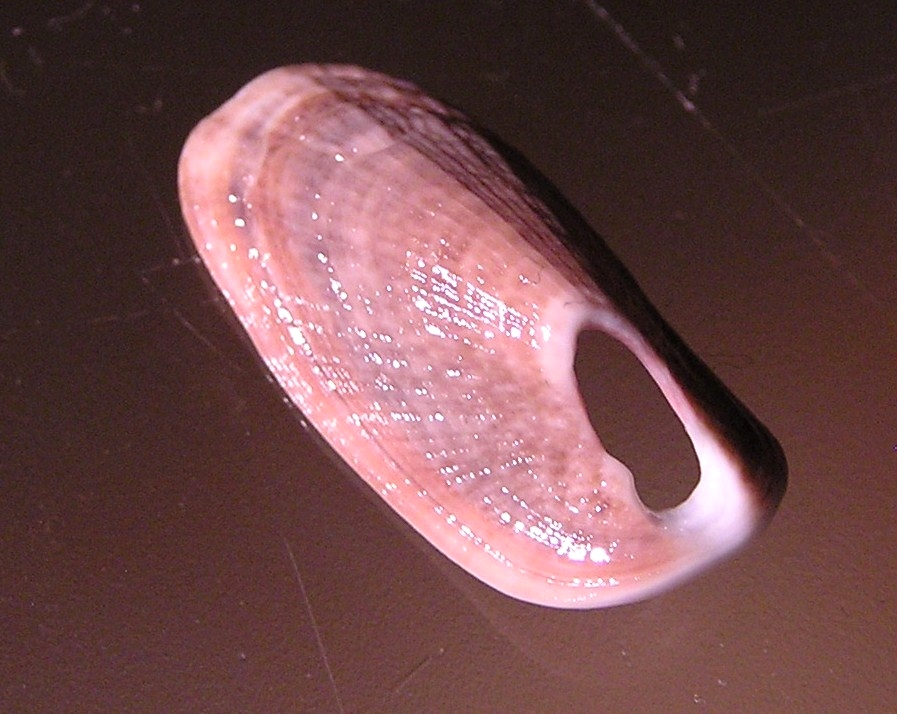
- Amblychilepas oblonga

Scientific classification
- Kingdom: Animalia
- Phylum: Mollusca
- Class: Gastropoda
- Subclass: Vetigastropoda
- Order: Lepetellida
- Family: Fissurellidae
- Subfamily: Fissurellinae
- Genus: Amblychilepas; Pilsbry, 1890

Type species
- * Fissurella trapezina, Sowerby, 1835 ( = Amblychilepas javanicensis (Lamarck, 1822))

Synonyms
- Megatebennus (Amblychilepas) Pilsbry, 1890 superseded rank; Sophismalepas Iredale, 1924 ·

= Amblychilepas =

Genus of gastropods

Amblychilepas is a genus of sea snails, marine gastropod mollusks in the family Fissurellidae, the keyhole limpets.

== Distribution ==
The species from this genus can be found in temperate waters of Australia, except Amblychilepas platyactis that is found along the Atlantic coast of the Cape Peninsula, South Africa.

== Description ==
Amblychilepas is closely associated with Dendrofissurella and Medusafissurella with which it shares radular and shell characters.

The body of species in this genus is larger than the shell. The anterior part of the oval shell is narrower than the rest. Both ends of the shell are somewhat raised. The sculpture of the shell shows fine radial ribs. The upper mantle fold only slightly envelops the edge of the shell. The apical opening (foramen) is elongate-oval and situated almost in the center. Long papillae extend from the mantle towards the foramen, as in A. nigrita. The foot extends behind the shell with a length larger than the shell. Contrary to Dendrofissurella and Medusafissurella, the foremost part of the foot (propodium) is unmodified.

The large outer lateral tooth of the radula is quadricuspid ( = with four cusps).

== Species ==
Species within the genus Amblychilepas include:

- † Amblychilepas acra (Cotton, 1947)
- Amblychilepas compressa (Thiele, 1930)
- Amblychilepas crucis (Beddome, 1882)
- Amblychilepas javanicensis (Lamarck, 1822): type species.
- Amblychilepas nigrita (G.B. Sowerby I, 1834)
- Amblychilepas oblonga (Menke, 1843)
- Amblychilepas omicron (Crosse & Fisher, 1864)
- Amblychilepas platyactis McLean & Lilburn, 1986

Species brought into synonymy

- Amblychilepas dubia (Reeve, 1849): synonym of Medusafissurella dubia (Reeve, 1849)
- Amblychilepas pritchardi Hedley, C., 1895: synonym of Amblychilepas nigrita (Sowerby I, 1834)
- Amblychilepas scutella (Gmelin, 1791): synonym of Dendrofissurella scutellum
