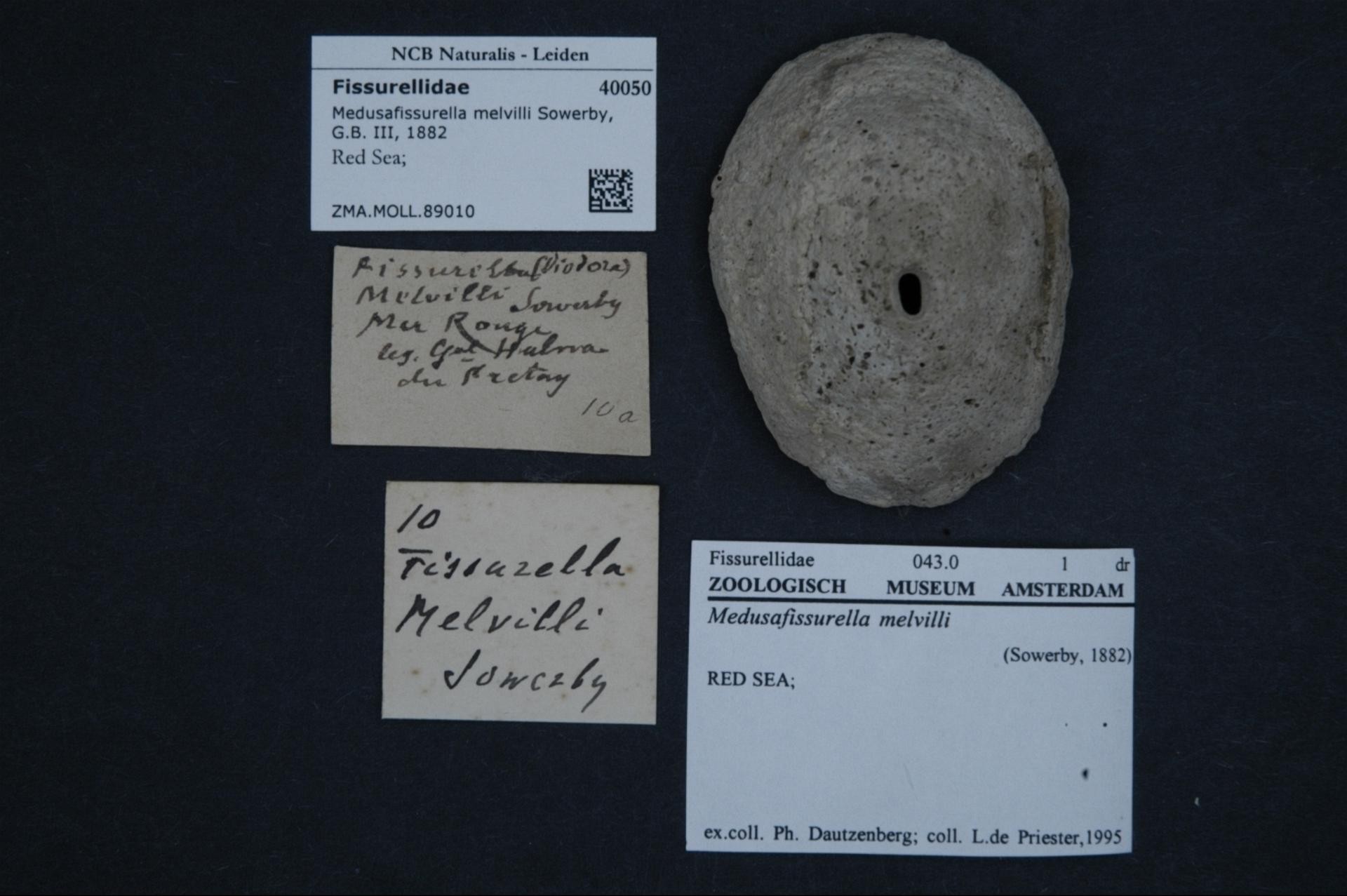

Scientific classification
- Kingdom: Animalia
- Phylum: Mollusca
- Class: Gastropoda
- Subclass: Vetigastropoda
- Order: Lepetellida
- Family: Fissurellidae
- Subfamily: Fissurellinae
- Genus: Medusafissurella
- Species: M. melvilli

Binomial name
- Medusafissurella melvilli (Sowerby III, 1882)

Synonyms
- Fissurella melvilli Sowerby III, 1882; Medusafissurella gallagheri Smythe, 1988

= Medusafissurella melvilli =

Species of gastropod

Medusafissurella melvilli is a species of sea snail, a marine gastropod mollusk in the family Fissurellidae, the keyhole limpets and slit limpets.
