= Diodora cruciata =

Scientific classification
- Kingdom: Animalia
- Phylum: Mollusca
- Class: Gastropoda
- Subclass: Vetigastropoda
- Order: Lepetellida
- Family: Fissurellidae
- Subfamily: Fissurellinae
- Genus: Diodora
- Species: D. cruciata

Binomial name
- Diodora cruciata (Gould, 1846)

Synonyms
- Fissurella cruciata Gould, 1846; Fissurella cruciata Krauss, 1848

Species of gastropod

Diodora cruciata is a species of sea snail, a marine gastropod mollusk in the family Fissurellidae, the keyhole limpets and slit limpets.

== Description ==
The size of the shell varies between 9 mm and 15 mm.

== Distribution ==
This marine species occurs off the Philippines.
