= Medusafissurella salebrosa =

Scientific classification
- Kingdom: Animalia
- Phylum: Mollusca
- Class: Gastropoda
- Subclass: Vetigastropoda
- Order: Lepetellida
- Family: Fissurellidae
- Subfamily: Fissurellinae
- Genus: Medusafissurella
- Species: M. salebrosa

Binomial name
- Medusafissurella salebrosa (Reeve, 1850)

Synonyms
- Fissurella salebrosa Reeve, 1850

Species of gastropod

Medusafissurella salebrosa is a species of sea snail, a marine gastropod mollusk in the family Fissurellidae, the keyhole limpets and slit limpets.
