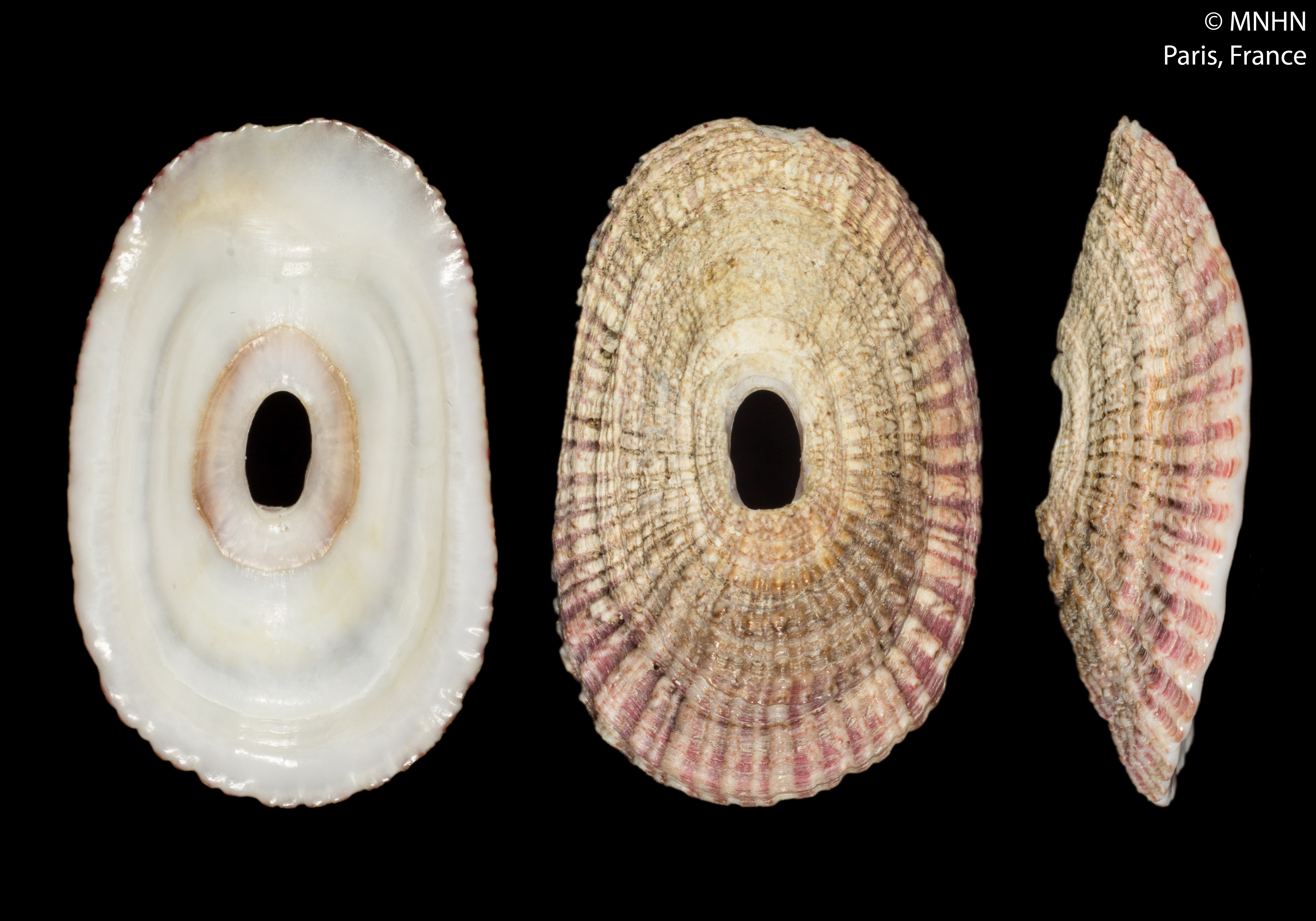
- Shell of Medusafissurella chemnitzii (neotype at MNHN, Paris)

Scientific classification
- Kingdom: Animalia
- Phylum: Mollusca
- Class: Gastropoda
- Subclass: Vetigastropoda
- Order: Lepetellida
- Family: Fissurellidae
- Subfamily: Fissurellinae
- Genus: Medusafissurella
- Species: M. chemnitzii

Binomial name
- Medusafissurella chemnitzii (Sowerby I, 1835)

Synonyms
- Fissurella chemnitzii G. B. Sowerby I, 1835 (original combination)

= Medusafissurella chemnitzii =

Species of gastropod

Medusafissurella chemnitzii is a species of sea snail, a marine gastropod mollusk in the family Fissurellidae, the keyhole limpets and slit limpets.

== Description ==
The length of the shell attains 24.6 mm.

== Distribution ==
This marine species occurs off Angola.
