= Macroschisma africanum =

Scientific classification
- Kingdom: Animalia
- Phylum: Mollusca
- Class: Gastropoda
- Subclass: Vetigastropoda
- Order: Lepetellida
- Family: Fissurellidae
- Subfamily: Fissurellinae
- Genus: Macroschisma
- Species: M. africanum

Binomial name
- Macroschisma africanum Tomlin, 1932

Synonyms
- Macroschisma africana [sic] (incorrect gender ending)

Species of gastropod

Macroschisma africanum is a species of sea snail, a marine gastropod mollusk in the family Fissurellidae, the keyhole limpets and slit limpets.

== Distribution ==
This species occurs in the following locations:

- Mascarene Basin
- Mauritius
