= Macroschisma compressum =

Scientific classification
- Kingdom: Animalia
- Phylum: Mollusca
- Class: Gastropoda
- Subclass: Vetigastropoda
- Order: Lepetellida
- Family: Fissurellidae
- Subfamily: Fissurellinae
- Genus: Macroschisma
- Species: M. compressum

Binomial name
- Macroschisma compressum Adams, 1850

Synonyms
- Macrochisma compressa Adams, 1851 (basionym); Macroschisma compressa [sic] (incorrect gender ending)

Species of gastropod

Macroschisma compressum is a species of sea snail, a marine gastropod mollusk in the family Fissurellidae, the keyhole limpets and slit limpets.

== Distribution ==
This species occurs off the following locations:

- Madagascar
- Red Sea
