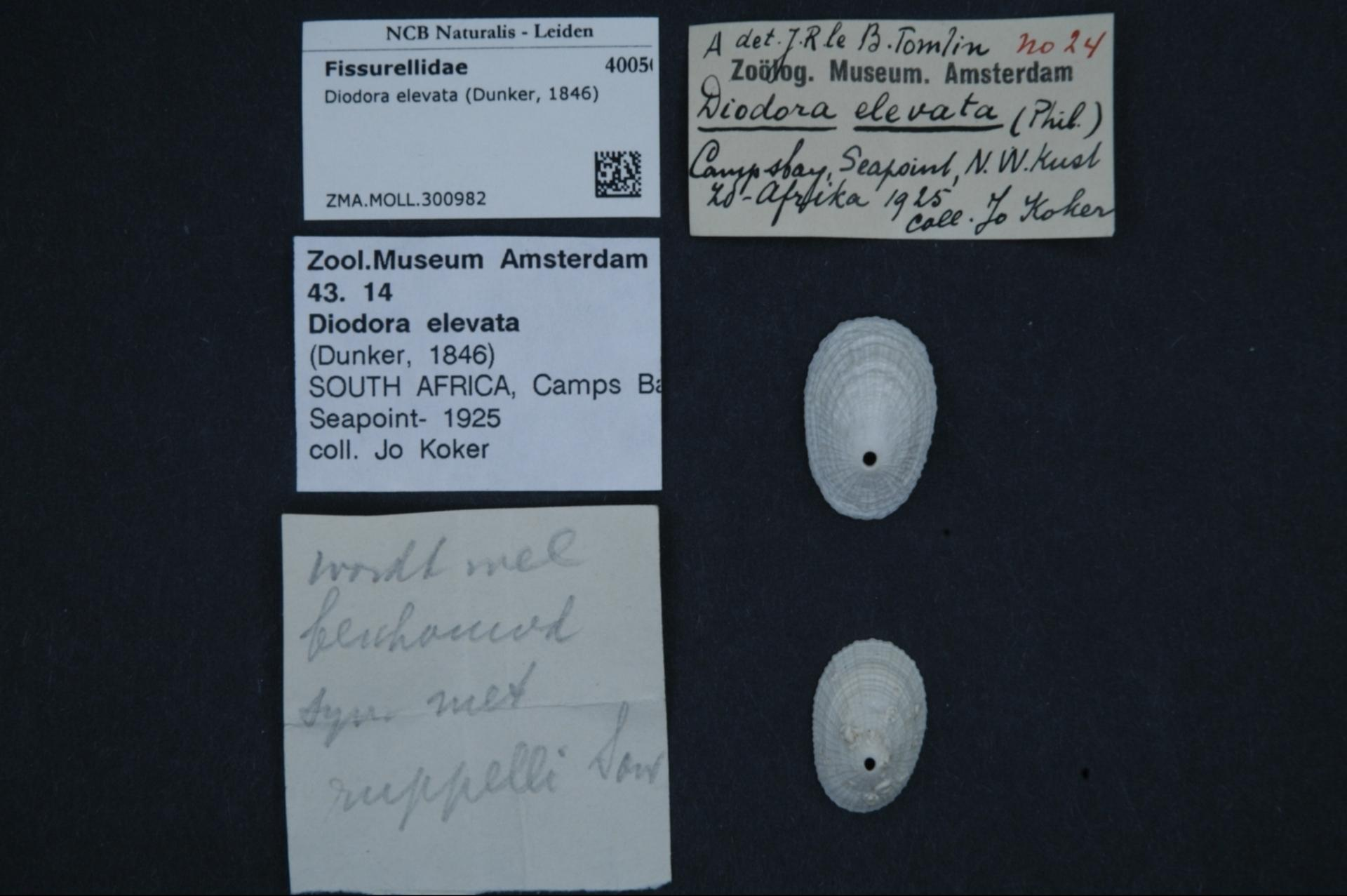

Scientific classification
- Kingdom: Animalia
- Phylum: Mollusca
- Class: Gastropoda
- Subclass: Vetigastropoda
- Order: Lepetellida
- Family: Fissurellidae
- Subfamily: Fissurellinae
- Genus: Diodora
- Species: D. elevata

Binomial name
- Diodora elevata (Dunker, 1846)

= Diodora elevata =

Species of gastropod

Diodora elevata is a species of sea snail, a marine gastropod mollusk in the family Fissurellidae, the keyhole limpets and slit limpets.

== Description ==
The size off the shell reaches 18 mm.

== Distribution ==
This marine species occurs off South Africa from Saldanha Bay to North Transkei.
