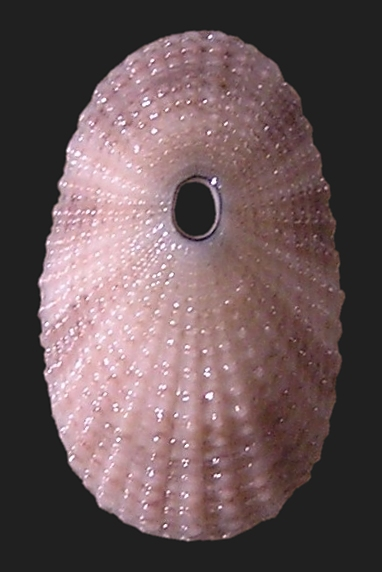
- A shell of Lucapina suffusa

Scientific classification
- Kingdom: Animalia
- Phylum: Mollusca
- Class: Gastropoda
- Subclass: Vetigastropoda
- Order: Lepetellida
- Family: Fissurellidae
- Subfamily: Fissurellinae
- Genus: Lucapina; Sowerby II, 1835

= Lucapina =

Genus of gastropods

Lucapina is a genus of sea snails, marine gastropod mollusks in the family Fissurellidae, the keyhole limpets.

== Species ==
Species within the genus Lucapina include:

- Lucapina adspersa (Philippi, 1845)
- Lucapina aegis (Reeve, 1850)
- Lucapina elisae Costa & Simone, 2006
- Lucapina eolis Pérez Farfante, 1945
- Lucapina philippiana (Finlay, 1930)
- Lucapina sowerbii (Sowerby I, 1835)
- Lucapina suffusa (Reeve, 1850)

Species brought into synonymy

- Lucapina adspersa auct. non Philippi, 1845: synonym of Lucapina sowerbii (Sowerby I, 1835)
- Lucapina cayenensis Lamarck, 1822: synonym of Diodora cayenensis (Lamarck, 1822)
- Lucapina elegans Sowerby I, 1835: synonym of Lucapina sowerbii (Sowerby I, 1835)
- Lucapina fasciata Dall, 1884: synonym of Lucapina sowerbii (Sowerby I, 1835)
- Lucapina harrassowitzi Ihering, 1927: synonym of Diodora harrassowitzi (Ihering, 1927)
- Lucapina itapema Ihering, 1927: synonym of Fissurella rosea (Gmelin, 1791)
- Lucapina limatula Reeve, 1850: synonym of Lucapinella limatula (Reeve, 1850)
- Lucapina meta Ihering, 1927: synonym of Diodora meta (Ihering, 1927)
- Lucapina monilifera Hutton, 1873: synonym of Monodilepas monilifera (Hutton, 1873)
- Lucapina textaranea Olsson & Harbison, 1953 : synonym of Lucapina suffusa (Reeve, 1850)
- Lucapina tobagoensis Pérez Farfante, 1945: synonym of Lucapina suffusa (Reeve, 1850)
