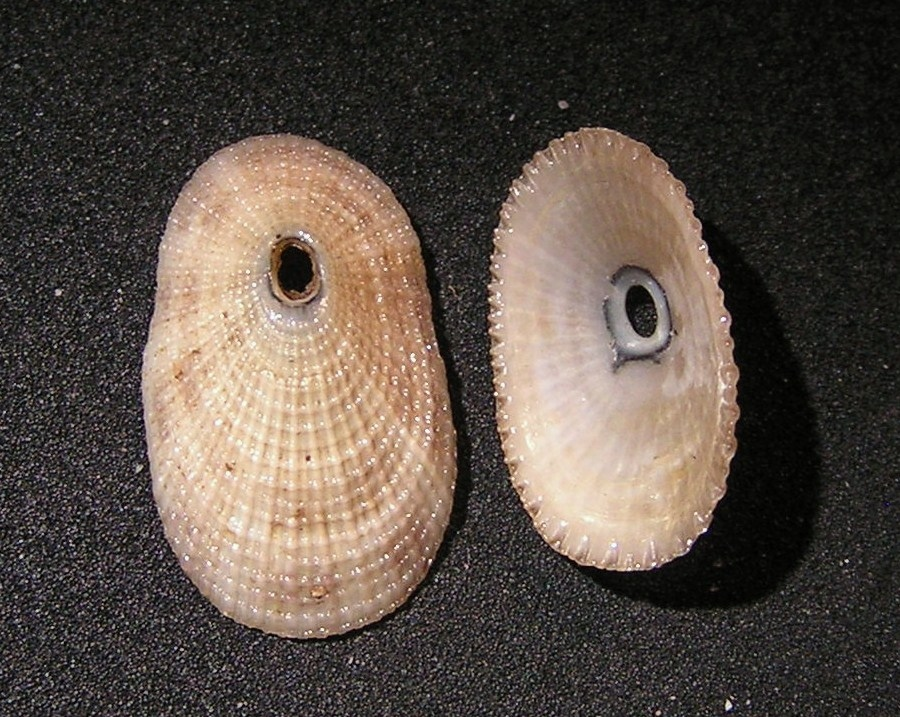
- Top and underside view of a shell of Lucapina sowerbii

Scientific classification
- Kingdom: Animalia
- Phylum: Mollusca
- Class: Gastropoda
- Subclass: Vetigastropoda
- Order: Lepetellida
- Family: Fissurellidae
- Genus: Lucapina
- Species: L. sowerbii

Binomial name
- Lucapina sowerbii (Sowerby I, 1835)

= Lucapina sowerbii =

Species of gastropod

Lucapina sowerbii, common name Sowerby's fleshy limpet, is a species of sea snail, a marine gastropod mollusk in the family Fissurellidae, the keyhole limpets.

== Description ==
The size of the shell varies between 15 mm and 30 mm.

== Distribution ==
This species occurs in the Atlantic Ocean from Florida to Brazil; in the Caribbean Sea, the Gulf of Mexico and the Lesser Antilles.
