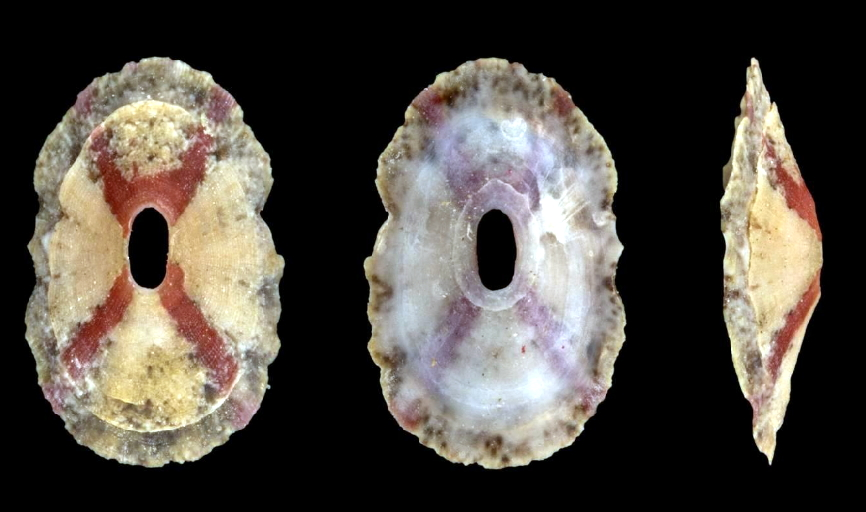
- Shell of Amblychilepas crucis (specimen at the Natural History Museum, London)

Scientific classification
- Kingdom: Animalia
- Phylum: Mollusca
- Class: Gastropoda
- Subclass: Vetigastropoda
- Order: Lepetellida
- Family: Fissurellidae
- Genus: Amblychilepas
- Species: A. crucis

Binomial name
- Amblychilepas crucis (C. E. Beddome, 1883)

Synonyms
- Fissurella crucis (C. E. Beddome, 1883) (original combination); Sophismaleps crucis (Beddome, 1883)

= Amblychilepas crucis =

Species of gastropod

Amblychilepas crucis, commonly known as the crossed keyhole limpet, is a species of sea snail, a marine gastropod mollusk in the family Fissurellidae, the keyhole limpets.

== Description ==
The size of the shell varies between 7.8 mm and 15.5 mm.

(Original description) The shell is oval and slightly elevated, with a cancellated surface texture. Its color ranges from white to yellowish, featuring two red lines on the back that intersect to form a cross. The aperture is oval in shape.

== Distribution ==
This species is endemic to Australia and occurs off New South Wales, Tasmania and Victoria.
