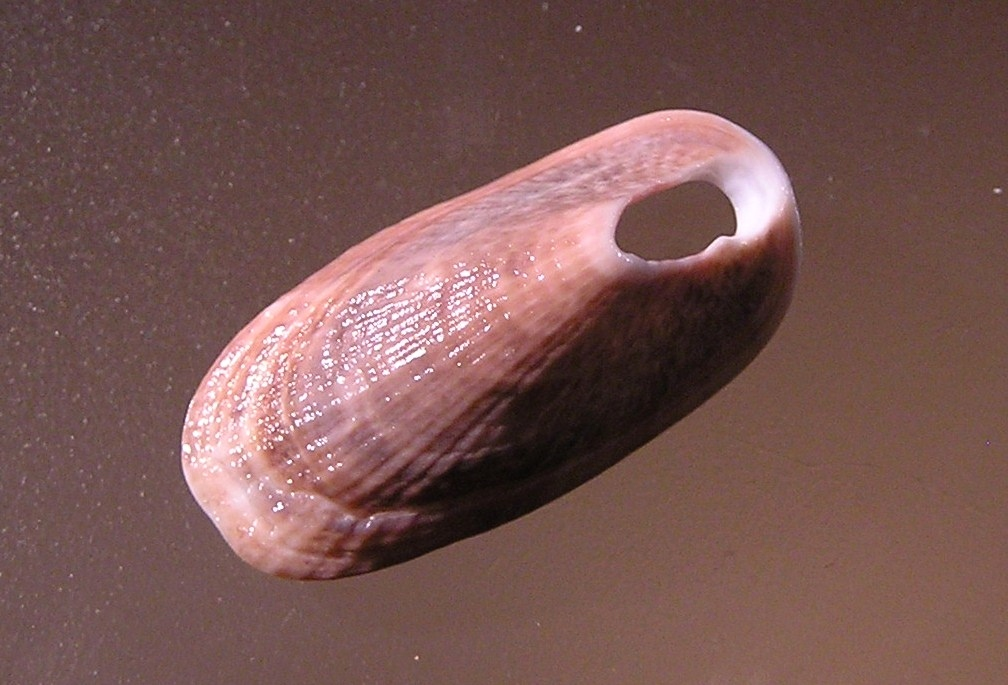
- Shell of Amblychilepas oblonga

Scientific classification
- Kingdom: Animalia
- Phylum: Mollusca
- Class: Gastropoda
- Subclass: Vetigastropoda
- Order: Lepetellida
- Family: Fissurellidae
- Genus: Amblychilepas
- Species: A. oblonga

Binomial name
- Amblychilepas oblonga (Menke, 1843)

Synonyms
- Fissurella oblonga Menke, 1843 (superseded combination); Lucapinella pritchardi Hedley, 1895 (junior subjective synonym)

= Amblychilepas oblonga =

Species of gastropod

Amblychilepas oblonga, common name the oblong keyhole limpet, is a species of sea snail, a marine gastropod mollusk in the family Fissurellidae, the keyhole limpets.

== Description ==
The size of the shell varies between 19.6 mm and 25.9 mm.

(Original description in Latin) The shell is oblong-elliptical and convex, with rounded anterior and posterior margins that ascend or curve slightly upward. Its surface is densely marked with faint radial ridges, intersected by concentric striations. The coloration is predominantly pink, with a pale area surrounding the large, ovate-oblong aperture.

== Distribution ==
This marine species is endemic to Australia and occurs off South Australia, Victoria and Western Australia; also off Papua New Guinea. .
