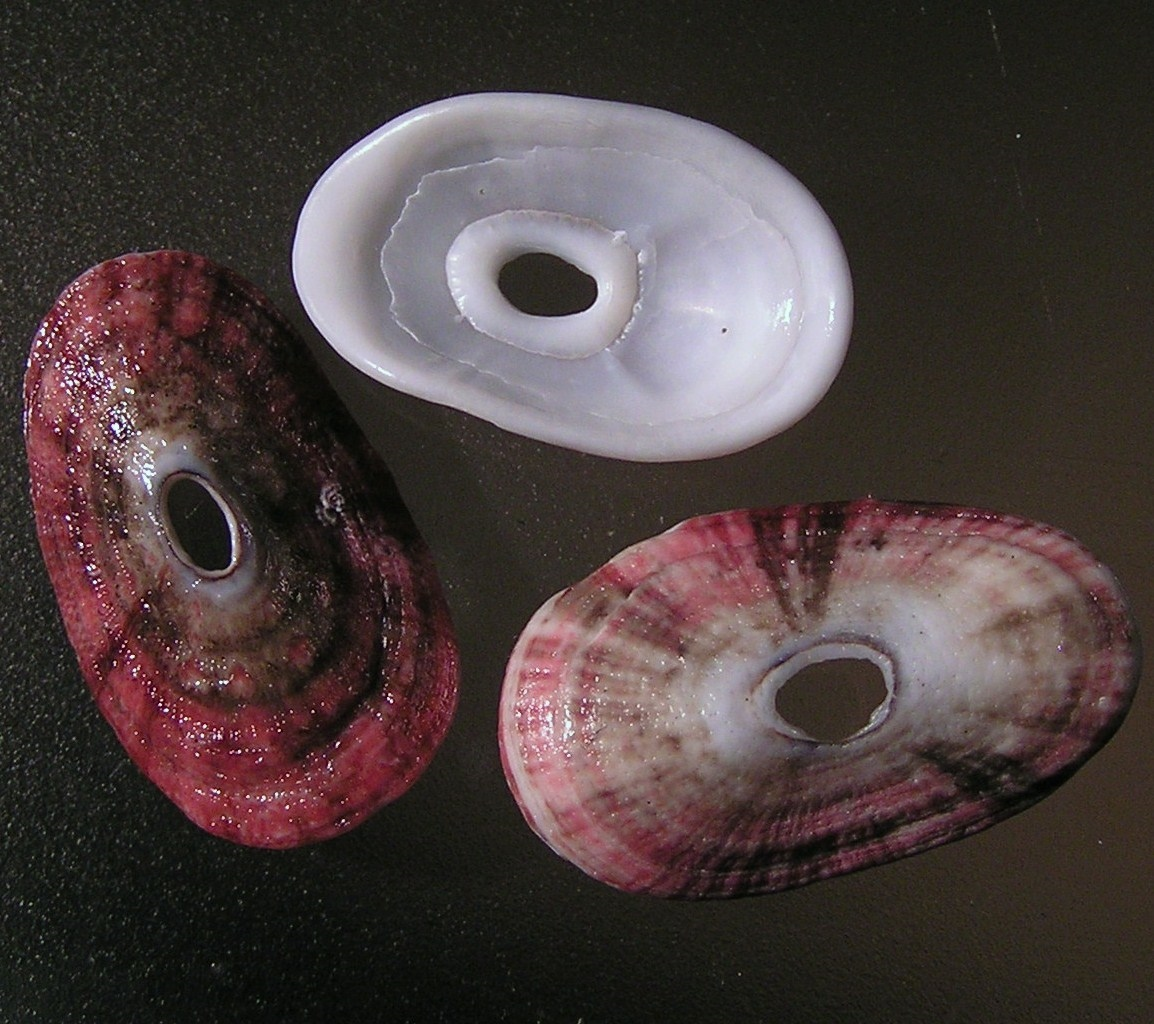
- Medusafissurella dubia

Scientific classification
- Kingdom: Animalia
- Phylum: Mollusca
- Class: Gastropoda
- Subclass: Vetigastropoda
- Order: Lepetellida
- Superfamily: Fissurelloidea
- Family: Fissurellidae
- Subfamily: Fissurellinae
- Genus: Medusafissurella; Mclean and Kilburn, 1986

Type species
- Fissurella salebrosa, Reeve, 1850

= Medusafissurella =

Genus of gastropods

Medusafissurella is a genus of minute deepwater keyhole limpets, marine gastropod mollusks or micromollusks in the family Fissurellidae, the keyhole limpets and slit limpets.

== Etymology ==
In Greek mythology Medusa was a Gorgon, a monster with snakes for hair. The radiating tentacles in Medusafissuralla recall the serpentine locks of this monster.

== Description ==
Medusafissurella is closely associated with Amblychilepas and Dendrofissurella with which it shares radular and shell characters. But Medusafissurella has a smaller body than the species in Amblychilepas, the genus to which it was previously assigned.

The body of species in Medusafissurella is larger than the shell. The anterior part of the shell is raised but is markedly narrowed. This character distinguishes Medusafissurella from most species in the genus Fissurella. The edge of the anterior shell is thinner and sharper than in the rest of the shell. The posterior end of the shell is not raised at all or only slightly raised. The opening at the apex (foramen) has an oval shape. The sculpture of the shell shows strong, scabrous ribs (= transverse folds) giving the impression of a rough surface with minute ribs. This character sets Medusafissurella apart from Amblychilepas and Dendrofissurella

The posterior portion of the foot is covered by the shell. The mantle folds only slightly envelop the edge of the shell. The foot also shows elaborate propodial processes at the propodium (front part of the foot) with numerous subequal (= nearly equal) radiating tentacles, that are sometimes branched, while in Dendrofissurella the tentacles have a single, main branching structure. The function of these tentacles is not well understood. They may serve to trap or hold food, but then they would be better attached to the snout above them instead of being attached to the propodium. The large outer lateral tooth of the radula is quadricuspid ( = with four cusps). The eyes are situated at the base of the cephalic tentacles.

== Species ==
- Medusafissurella chemnitzii, (Sowerby I, 1835): East Africa and Arabian Sea
- Medusafissurella dubia Reeve, 1849: Southern and eastern Africa
- Medusafissurella melvilli (Sowerby III, 1882)
- Medusafissurella salebrosa (Reeve, 1850): Southwestern Africa

Species brought into synonymy

- Medusafissurella gallagheri Smythe, 1988: synonym of Medusafissurella melvilli (G. B. Sowerby III, 1882)
