= Amblychilepas acra =

Scientific classification
- Kingdom: Animalia
- Phylum: Mollusca
- Class: Gastropoda
- Subclass: Vetigastropoda
- Order: Lepetellida
- Family: Fissurellidae
- Genus: Amblychilepas
- Species: †A. acra

Binomial name
- †Amblychilepas acra (Cotton, 1947)

Synonyms
- † Sophismalepas acra Cotton, 1947 superseded combination

Species of gastropod

Amblychilepas acra is an extinct species of sea snail, a marine gastropod mollusk in the family Fissurellidae, the keyhole limpets.

== Description ==
The size of this species varies between 9 mm and 14 mm.

== Distribution ==
Fossils of this marine species were found in Pliocene strata in South Australia.
