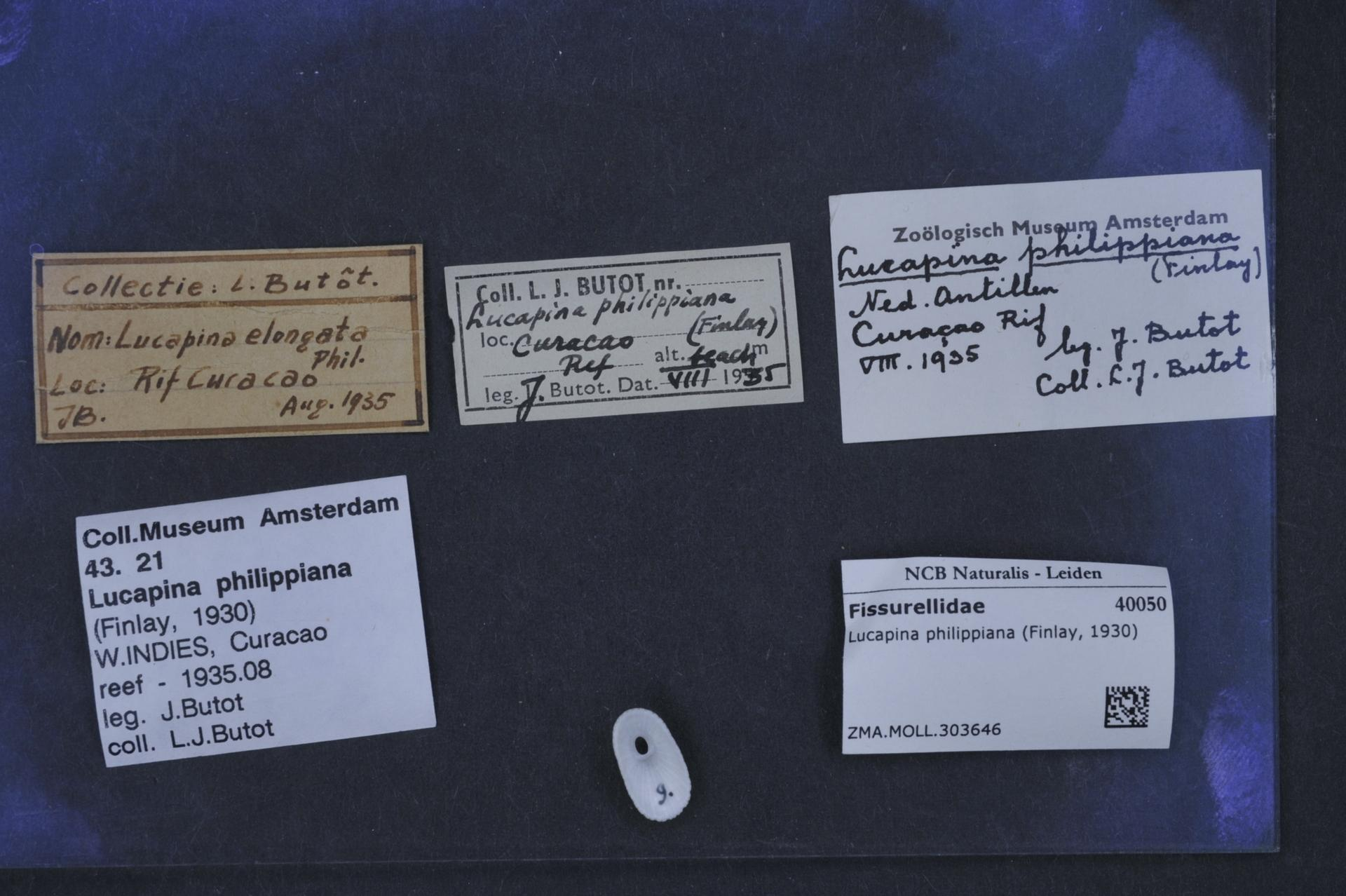

Scientific classification
- Kingdom: Animalia
- Phylum: Mollusca
- Class: Gastropoda
- Subclass: Vetigastropoda
- Order: Lepetellida
- Family: Fissurellidae
- Genus: Lucapina
- Species: L. philippiana

Binomial name
- Lucapina philippiana (Finlay, 1930)

= Lucapina philippiana =

Species of sea snail

Lucapina philippiana is a species of sea snail, a marine gastropod mollusk in the family Fissurellidae, the keyhole limpets.
