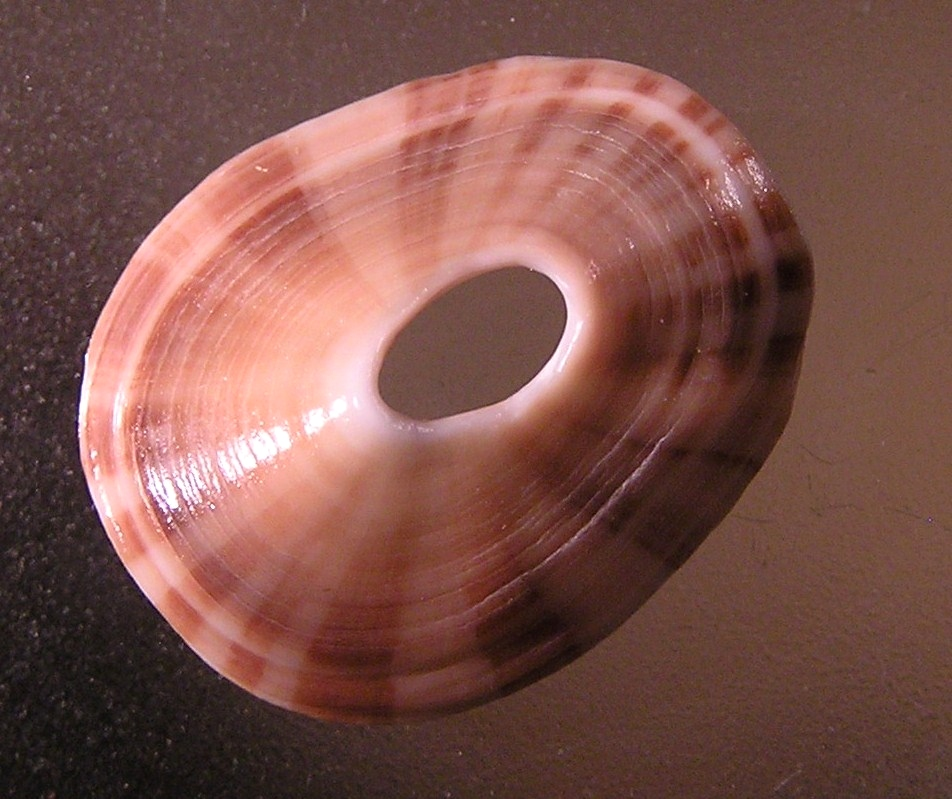
- Macroschisma tasmaniae

Scientific classification
- Kingdom: Animalia
- Phylum: Mollusca
- Class: Gastropoda
- Subclass: Vetigastropoda
- Order: Lepetellida
- Superfamily: Fissurelloidea
- Family: Fissurellidae
- Subfamily: Fissurellinae
- Genus: Macroschisma; Gray, 1835

Type species
- Patella macroschisma Lightfoot, 1786

Synonyms
- Dolichoschisma Iredale, 1940; Forolepas Iredale, 1940; Macroschisma Agassiz, 1846; Machrochisma (misspelling); Macrochisma [sic] (misspelling)

= Macroschisma =

Genus of gastropods

Macroschisma, commonly called the narrow slot limpets, is a genus of sea snails, marine gastropod mollusks in the family Fissurellidae, the keyhole limpets and slit limpets.

== Species ==
Species within the genus Macroschisma include:

- Macroschisma africanum Tomlin, 1932
- Macroschisma angustatum A. Adams, 1851
- Macroschisma bakiei Adams in Sowerby, 1862
- Macroschisma compressum Adams, 1850
- Macroschisma cuspidatum Adams, 1851
- Macroschisma dilatatum Adams, 1851
- Macroschisma elegans Preston, 1908
- Macroschisma hiatula Swainson, 1840
- Macroschisma madreporaria Hedley, 1907
- Macroschisma maximum Adams, 1851
- Macroschisma megatrema Adams, 1851
- Macroschisma munitum (Iredale, 1940)
- Macroschisma productum Adams, 1850
- Macroschisma rubrum Poppe, Tagaro & Stahlschmidt, 2015
- Macroschisma scutiformis G. Nevill & H. Nevill, 1869
- Macroschisma sinense Adams, 1855
- Macroschisma tasmaniae (Sowerby II, 1862)

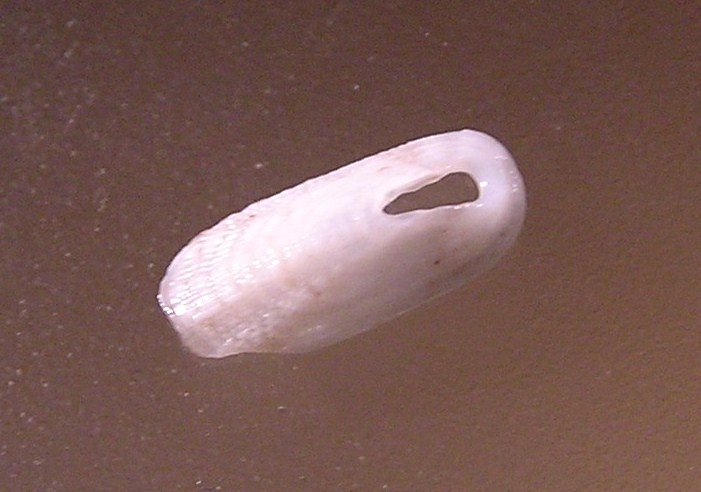
Macroschisma munitum

Species brought into synonymy

- Macroschisma africana (sic): synonym of Macroschisma africanum Tomlin, 1932
- Macroschisma canalifera (Nevill & H. Nevill, 1869): synonym of Lucapinella canalifera (G. Nevill & H. Nevill, 1869)
- Macroschisma compressa (sic): synonym of Macroschisma compressum Adams, 1850
- Macroschisma cuspidata (sic): synonym of Macroschisma cuspidatum Adams, 1851
- Macroschisma dilatata (sic): synonym of Macroschisma dilatatum Adams, 1851
- Macroschisma magathura (sic): synonym of Macroschisma megatrema Adams, 1851
- Macroschisma maxima [sic] : synonym of Macroschisma maximum Adams, 1851
- Macroschisma munita (sic): synonym of Macroschisma munitum (Iredale, 1940)
- Macroschisma producta (sic): synonym of Macroschisma productum Adams, 1850
- Macroschisma sinensis [sic] : synonym of Macroschisma sinense Adams, 1855
