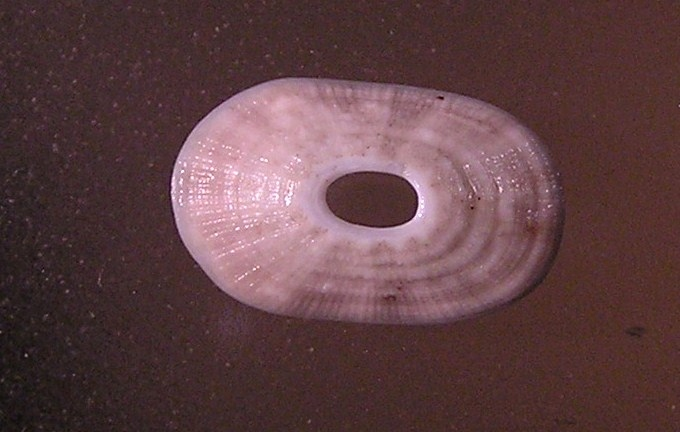

Scientific classification
- Kingdom: Animalia
- Phylum: Mollusca
- Class: Gastropoda
- Subclass: Vetigastropoda
- Order: Lepetellida
- Family: Fissurellidae
- Genus: Amblychilepas
- Species: A. nigrita

Binomial name
- Amblychilepas nigrita (G.B. Sowerby I, 1834)

Synonyms
- Amblychilepas pritchardi Hedley, C., 1895; Fissurella nigrita Sowerby I, 1834 (original combination); Sophismalepas nigrita (G.B. Sowerby I, 1834)

= Amblychilepas nigrita =

Species of gastropod

Amblychilepas nigrita, common name the black keyhole limpet, is a species of sea snail, a marine gastropod mollusk in the family Fissurellidae, the keyhole limpets.

== Description ==
The size of the shell varies between 10 mm and 25 mm.

(Original description in Latin) The shell is oval and flattened, with slightly compressed sides and gently raised extremities. Internally, it is white, featuring thickened posterior and lateral margins. Externally, the shell is black, adorned with fine radial striations. The dorsal aperture is large, oval in shape, and bordered by a smooth, white margin.

== Distribution ==
This marine species is endemic to Australia and occurs off southern Queensland, Western Australia and off Tasmania in shallow water under stones.

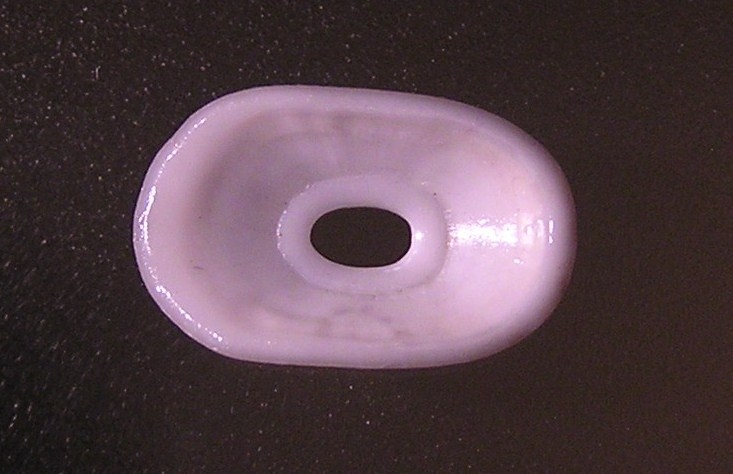
Basal view
