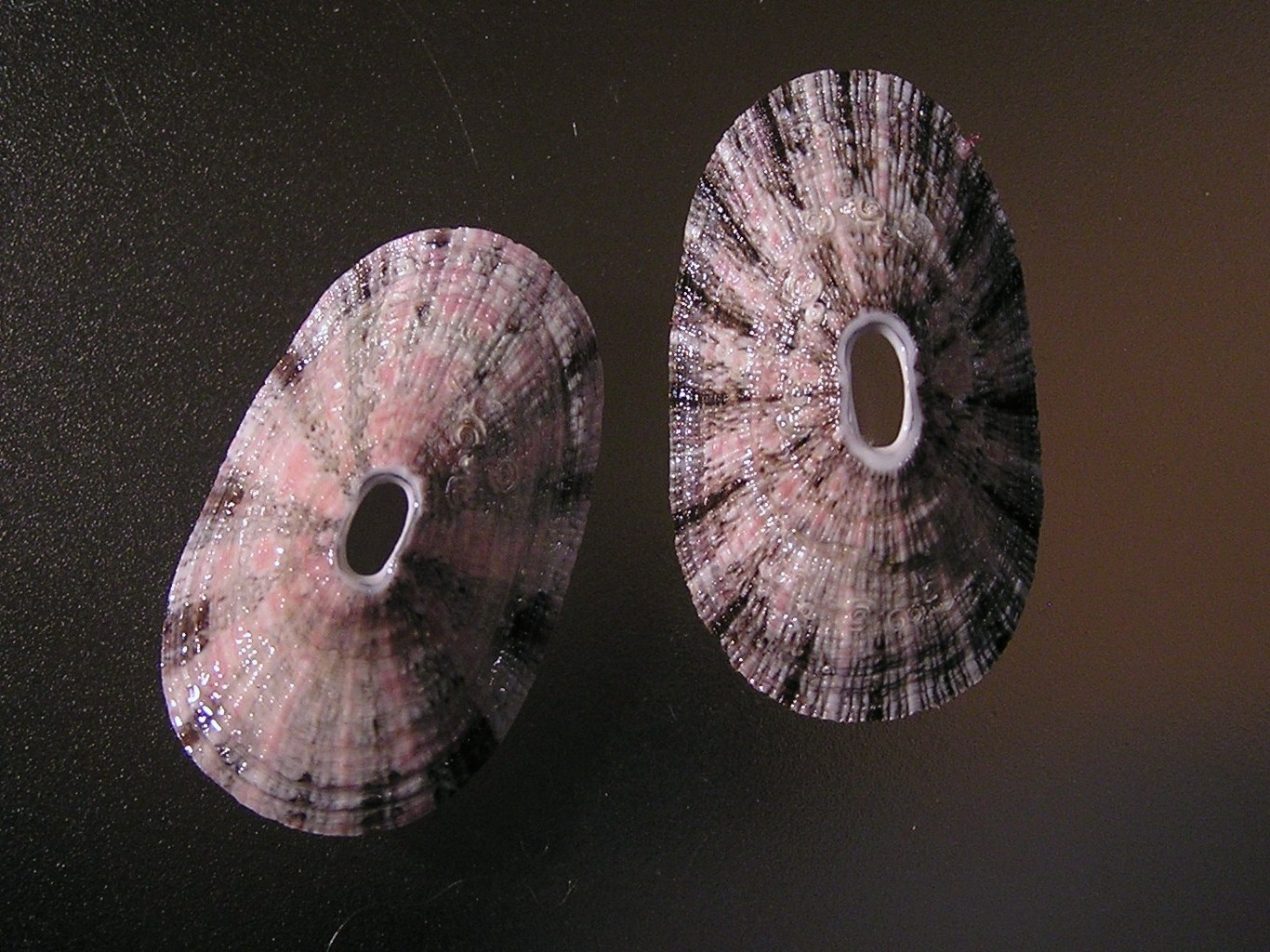
- Dendrofissurella scutellum hiantula

Scientific classification
- Kingdom: Animalia
- Phylum: Mollusca
- Class: Gastropoda
- Subclass: Vetigastropoda
- Order: Lepetellida
- Family: Fissurellidae
- Subfamily: Fissurellinae
- Genus: Dendrofissurella; Mclean and Kilburn, 1986
- Species: D. scutellum

Binomial name
- Dendrofissurella scutellum Mclean and Kilburn, 1986

Synonyms
- Amblychilepas scutella (Gmelin, 1791)

= Dendrofissurella scutellum =

Species of mollusc

Dendrofissurella is a monotypic genus of minute deepwater keyhole limpets, marine gastropod mollusks in the family Fissurellidae, the keyhole limpets and slit limpets.

== Taxonomy ==
Dendrofissurella scutellum is the sole species in this genus. However, two geographic subspecies are recognized :

- Dendrofissurella scutellum hiantula (Lamarck, 1822) (synonyms : Fissurella hiantula, Lamarck, 1822; Fissurellidea hiantula, Sowerby II, 1862; Amblychilepas scutellum hiantula, Kilburn and Rippey, 1982; Fissurella incarnata, Krauss, 1848; Fissurellidea incarnata, Sowerby II, 1862; Megatebennus (section Amblychilepas) incarnata, Pilsbry, 1890; Fissurellidea incarnata maculata, Turton, 1962; Fissurellidea multilineata, Turton, 1932; Fissurellidea albanyana, Turton, 1932; Fissurellidea nigrostrigata, Turton, 1932)
- Dendrofissurella scutellum scutellum (Gmelin, 1791) (synonyms : Patella scutellum, Gmelin, 1791; Fissurella scutellum, Krauss, 1848; Megatebennus (section Amblychilepas) scutellum, Pilsbry, 1890: Fissurellidaea scutella, Turton, 1932; Amblychilepas scutella, Barnard, 1963; Amblychilepas scutellum, Kensley, 1973; Amblychilepas scutellum scutellum, Kilburn and Rippey, 1982; Fissurellidea sella, Sowerby II, 1862; Megatebennus (section Amblychilepas) sella, Pilsbry, 1890)

As is shown by the many synonyms, it has taken a long time to recognize that this species (composed of these two subspecies) belongs in its own genus.

== Distribution ==
This species occurs in the Cape Province of South Africa. D. scutellum scutellum is found on the colder, temperate Atlantic coast while D. scutellum hiantula is found to the east, along the warmer temperate coastline.

== Description ==
Dendrofissurella is closely associated with Amblychilepas and Medusafissurella with which it shares radular and shell characters.

The body of Dendrofissurella scutellum is larger than the shell. The anterior part of the shell is narrower than the rest. Both ends of the shell are somewhat raised. The sculpture of the shell shows fine radial ribs. The mantle folds only slightly envelop the edge of the shell. The apical opening (foramen) is elongate-oval and situated almost in the center. The foot extends behind the shell with a length larger than the shell. The foremost part of the foot (propodium) is elongated by a single, tapering trunk with approximately nine lateral branched that are irregularly placed. This character sets Dendrofissurella apart from Amblychilepas and Medusafissurella.

The large outer lateral tooth of the radula is quadricuspid ( = with four cusps).
