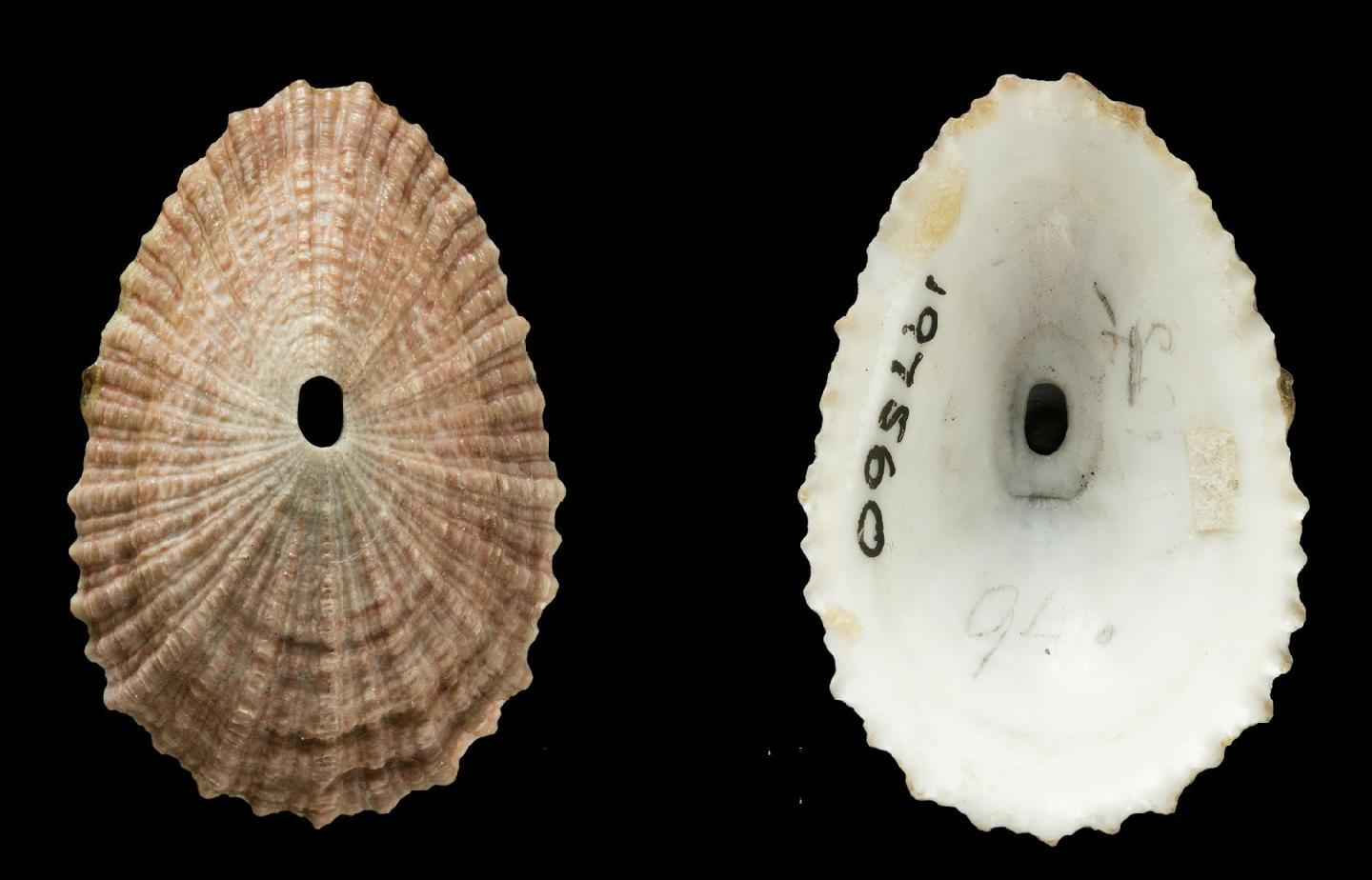
- Shell of Amblychilepas compressa (specimen at the Natural History Museum, London)

Scientific classification
- Kingdom: Animalia
- Phylum: Mollusca
- Class: Gastropoda
- Subclass: Vetigastropoda
- Order: Lepetellida
- Family: Fissurellidae
- Genus: Amblychilepas
- Species: A. compressa

Binomial name
- Amblychilepas compressa (Thiele, 1930)

Synonyms
- Fissurella (Sophismalepas) compressa Thiele, 1930 (original combination)

= Amblychilepas compressa =

Species of gastropod

Amblychilepas compressa, commonly known as the rayed keyhole limpet, is a species of sea snail, a marine gastropod mollusk in the family Fissurellidae, the keyhole limpets.

== Description ==
The size of the shell varies between 8.7 mm and 14.5 mm.

== Distribution ==
This marine species occurs off Western Australia, living in sand in open but sheltered waters in the subtidal zone from low water to depths of about 20 m.
