= Lucapina elisae =

Scientific classification
- Kingdom: Animalia
- Phylum: Mollusca
- Class: Gastropoda
- Subclass: Vetigastropoda
- Order: Lepetellida
- Family: Fissurellidae
- Genus: Lucapina
- Species: L. elisae

Binomial name
- Lucapina elisae Costa & Simone, 2006

Species of mollusc

Lucapina elisae is a species of sea snail, a marine gastropod mollusk in the family Fissurellidae, the keyhole limpets.
