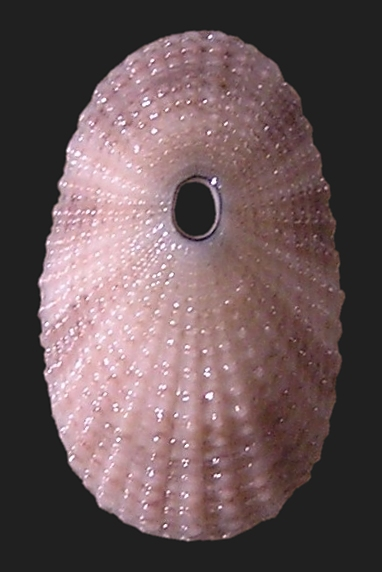
- A shell of Lucapina suffusa

Scientific classification
- Kingdom: Animalia
- Phylum: Mollusca
- Class: Gastropoda
- Subclass: Vetigastropoda
- Order: Lepetellida
- Family: Fissurellidae
- Genus: Lucapina
- Species: L. suffusa

Binomial name
- Lucapina suffusa (Reeve, 1850)

= Lucapina suffusa =

Species of gastropod

Lucapina suffusa is a species of sea snail, a marine gastropod mollusk in the family Fissurellidae, the keyhole limpets.

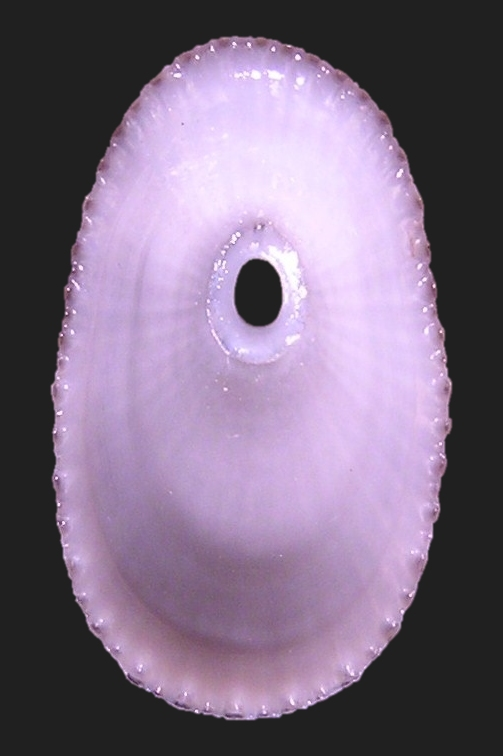
Basal view
