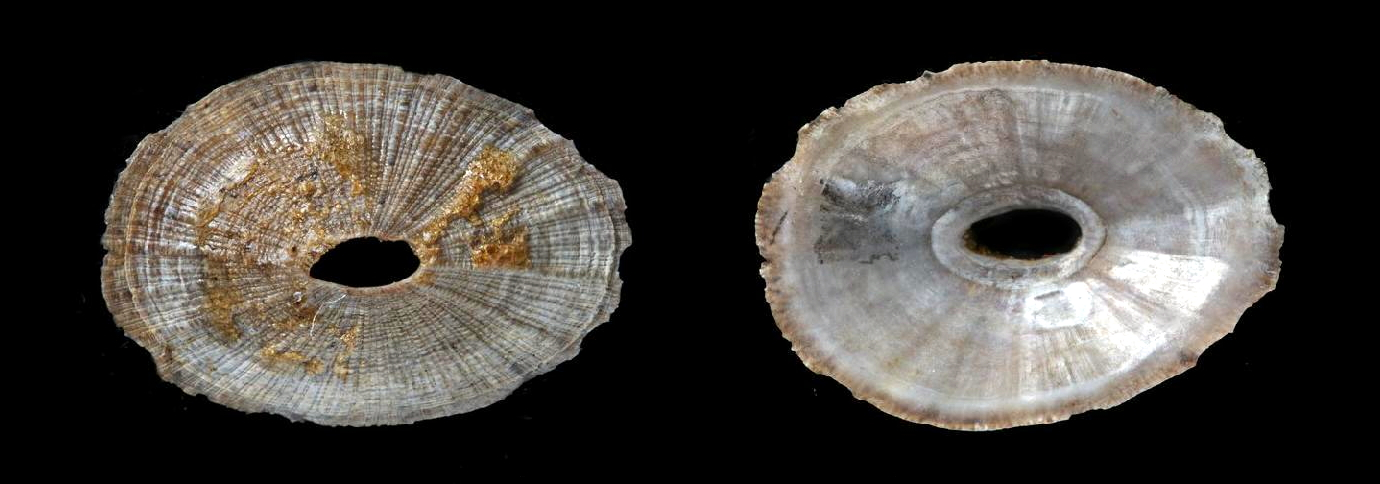
- Shell of Amblychilepas omicron (specimen in the Natural History Museum, London)

Scientific classification
- Kingdom: Animalia
- Phylum: Mollusca
- Class: Gastropoda
- Subclass: Vetigastropoda
- Order: Lepetellida
- Family: Fissurellidae
- Genus: Amblychilepas
- Species: A. omicron

Binomial name
- Amblychilepas omicron (Crosse & P. Fischer, 1864)

Synonyms
- Fissurella omicron (Crosse & P. Fischer, 1864) (superseded combination)

= Amblychilepas omicron =

Species of gastropod

Amblychilepas omicron, common name the oblong keyhole limpet, is a species of sea snail, a marine gastropod mollusk in the family Fissurellidae, the keyhole limpets.

== Description ==
The size of the shell varies between 9.3 mm and 12.6 mm.

(Original description in French) The shell is oval and flattened, featuring radiating ribs that are crossed by fine concentric striations. These striations are most prominent near the apex, lending the shell a granular texture in that area. The spaces between the ribs are intricately furrowed with numerous additional radiating striations. Inside, the shell is smooth, glossy, and bluish-white. Its edge is clean and sharp, while the central fissure is oval in shape and bordered on the interior.

== Distribution ==
This marine species is endemic to Australia and occurs off South Australia, Tasmania, Victoria and Western Australia .
