= Lucapina eolis =

Scientific classification
- Kingdom: Animalia
- Phylum: Mollusca
- Class: Gastropoda
- Subclass: Vetigastropoda
- Order: Lepetellida
- Family: Fissurellidae
- Genus: Lucapina
- Species: L. eolis

Binomial name
- Lucapina eolis Pérez Farfante, 1945

Species of gastropod

Lucapina eolis is a species of sea snail, a marine gastropod mollusk in the family Fissurellidae, the keyhole limpets.
