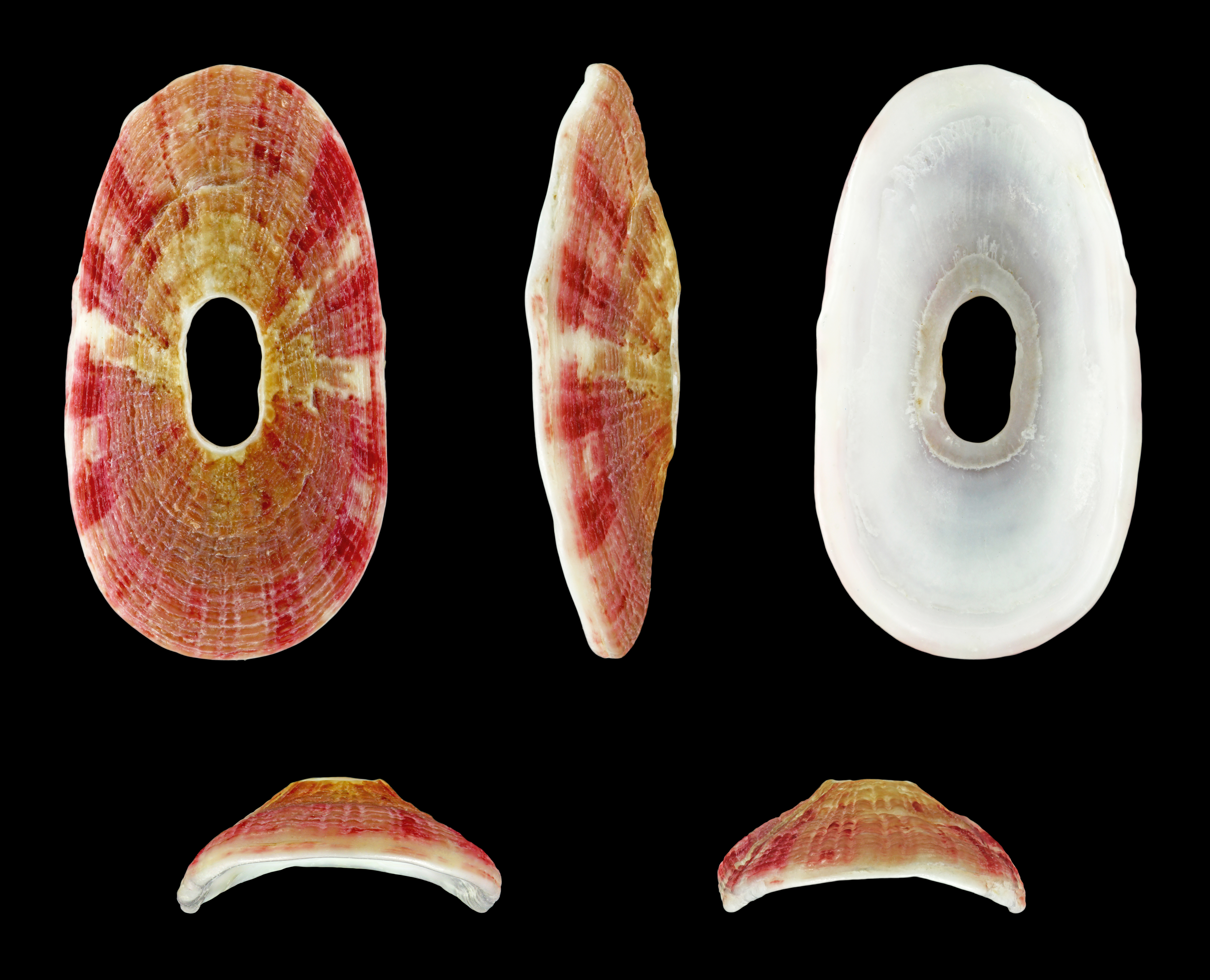

Scientific classification
- Kingdom: Animalia
- Phylum: Mollusca
- Class: Gastropoda
- Subclass: Vetigastropoda
- Order: Lepetellida
- Family: Fissurellidae
- Genus: Amblychilepas
- Species: A. platyactis

Binomial name
- Amblychilepas platyactis McLean & Kilburn, 1986

= Amblychilepas platyactis =

Species of gastropod

Amblychilepas platyactis is a species of sea snail, a marine gastropod mollusk in the family Fissurellidae, the keyhole limpets.

== Description ==
The size of this species varies between 11 mm and 25 mm. It typically has an oval shape with an aperture (hole) on the top side. Most specimens have a reddish yellow colour with a smooth white underside.

== Distribution ==
This marine species occurs off West Cape to East London, South Africa.
