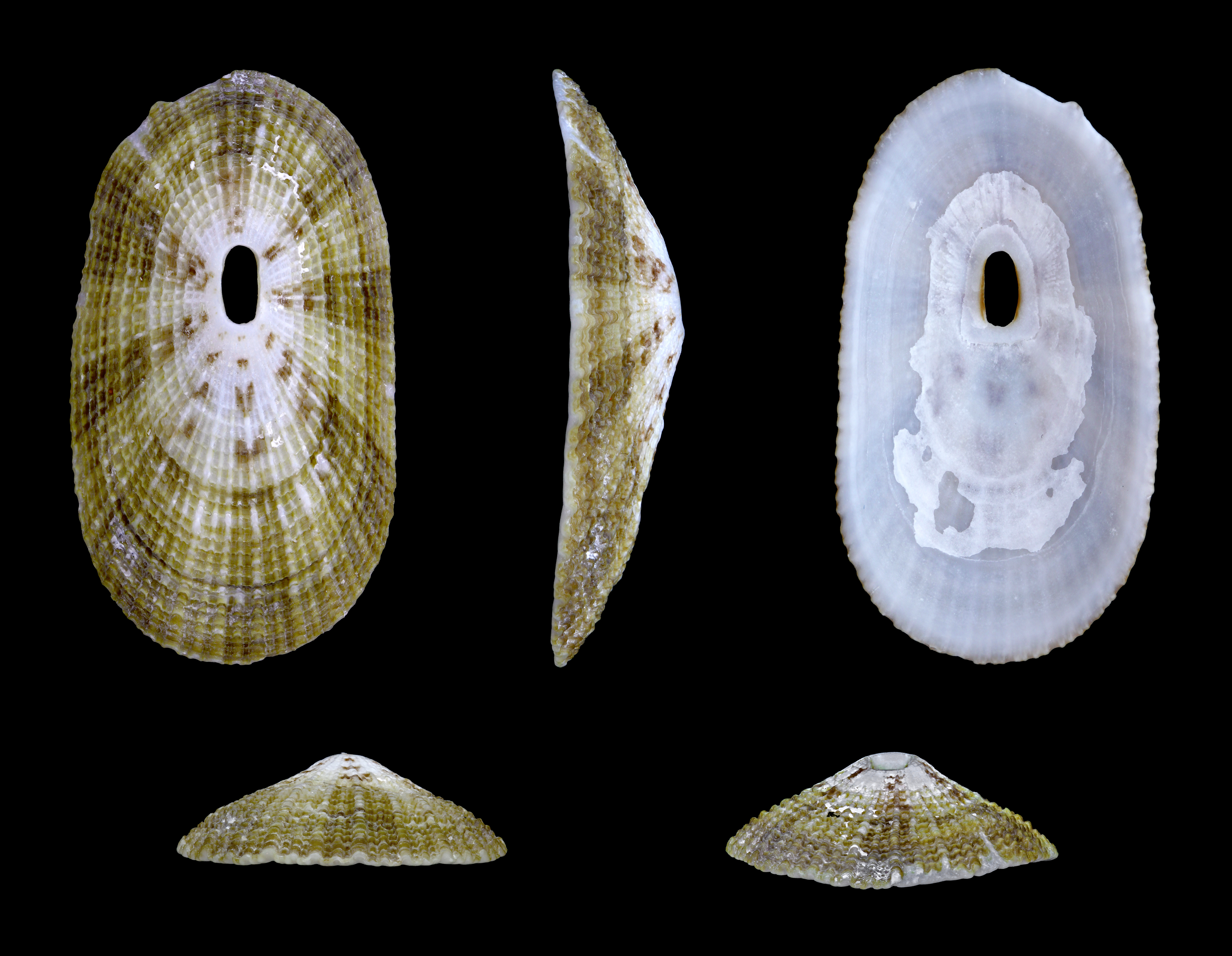

Scientific classification
- Kingdom: Animalia
- Phylum: Mollusca
- Class: Gastropoda
- Subclass: Vetigastropoda
- Order: Lepetellida
- Family: Fissurellidae
- Genus: Lucapina
- Species: L. aegis

Binomial name
- Lucapina aegis (Reeve, 1850)

= Lucapina aegis =

Species of gastropod

Lucapina aegis is a species of sea snail, a marine gastropod mollusk in the family Fissurellidae, the keyhole limpets.
