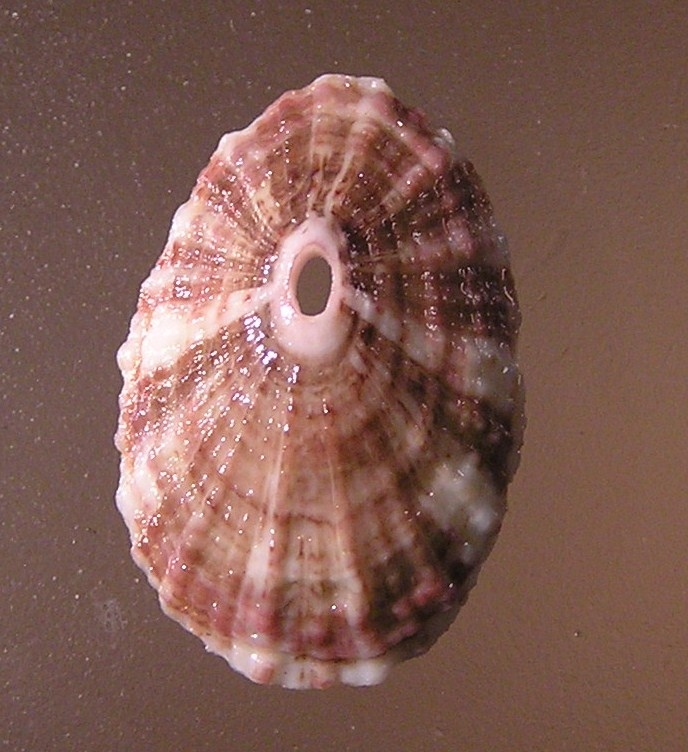
- Fissurella rosea

Scientific classification
- Kingdom: Animalia
- Phylum: Mollusca
- Class: Gastropoda
- Subclass: Vetigastropoda
- Order: Lepetellida
- Family: Fissurellidae
- Genus: Fissurella
- Species: F. rosea

Binomial name
- Fissurella rosea (Gmelin, 1791)

Synonyms
- Fissurella huttoni Suter, 1906; Fissurella lilacina Lamarck, 1822; Fissurella squamosa Hutton, 1873; Fissurella (Cremides) rosea (Gmelin, 1791); Fissurella sculpta Pilsbry, 1890; Lucapina itapema Ihering, H. von, 1927; Patella rubeola Röding, 1798

= Fissurella rosea =

Species of gastropod

Fissurella rosea, common name the rosy keyhole limpet, is a species of sea snail, a marine gastropod mollusk in the family Fissurellidae, the keyhole limpets.

== Description ==
The size of the shell varies between 17 mm and 40 mm.

== Distribution ==
This species occurs in the Caribbean Sea, the Gulf of Mexico and off the Lesser Antilles; in the Atlantic Ocean off Southern Brazil.

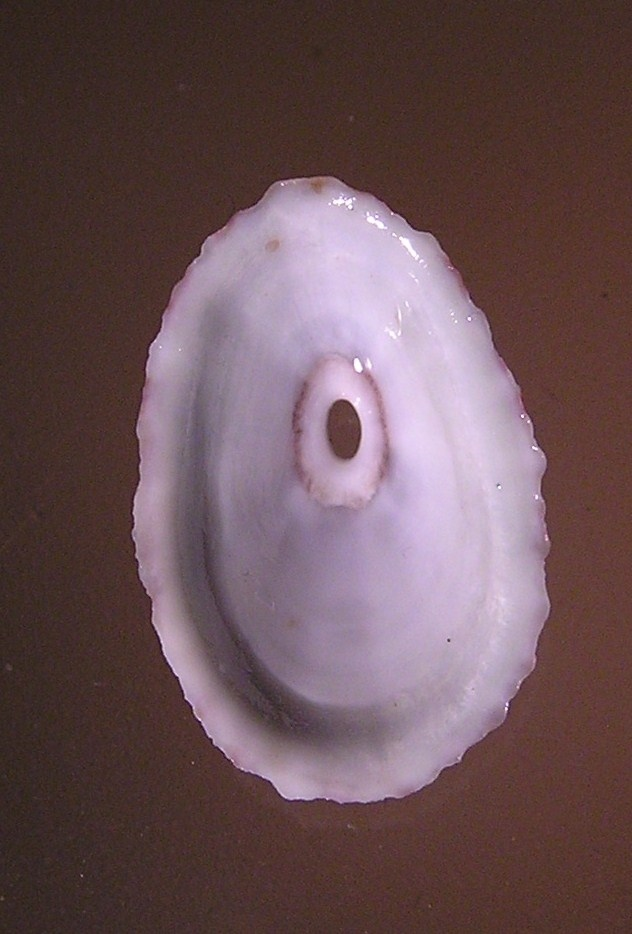
Fissurella rosea, basal view
