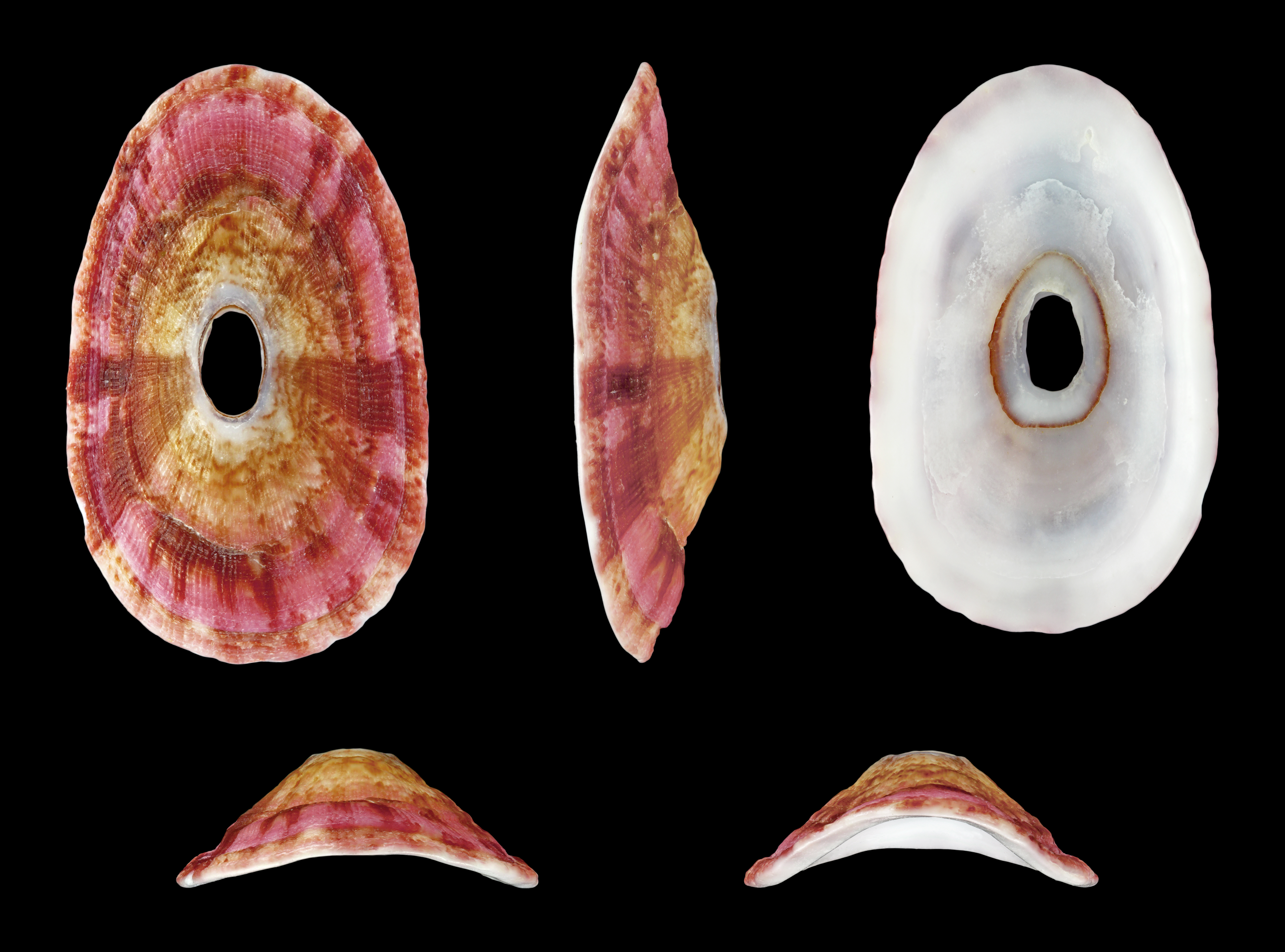

Scientific classification
- Kingdom: Animalia
- Phylum: Mollusca
- Class: Gastropoda
- Subclass: Vetigastropoda
- Order: Lepetellida
- Family: Fissurellidae
- Genus: Medusafissurella
- Species: M. dubia

Binomial name
- Medusafissurella dubia (Reeve, 1849)

Synonyms
- Amblychilepas dubia (Reeve, 1849); Fissurella dubia Reeve, 1849; Fissuridea genevievae Dautzenberg, Ph., 192

= Medusafissurella dubia =

Species of gastropod

Medusafissurella dubia is a species of sea snail, a marine gastropod mollusk in the family Fissurellidae, better known as the keyhole limpets.

== Description ==
The shell size varies between 16 mm and 36 mm.

== Distribution ==
This species is distributed in the Indian Ocean along Kenya, Madagascar and South Africa.
