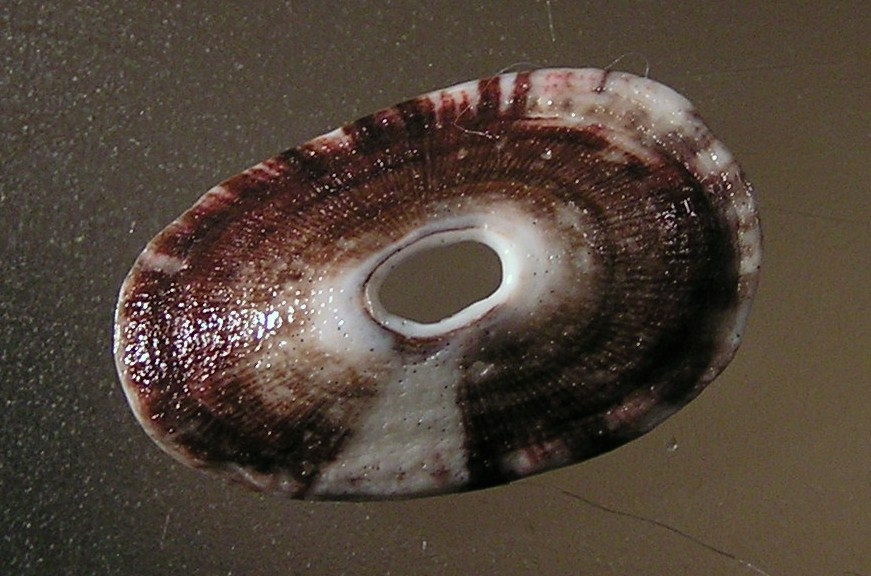
- A shell of Medusafissurella dubia

Scientific classification
- Kingdom: Animalia
- Phylum: Mollusca
- Class: Gastropoda
- Subclass: Vetigastropoda
- Order: Lepetellida
- Family: Fissurellidae
- Subfamily: Fissurellinae; Fleming, 1822

= Fissurellinae =

Subfamily of gastropods

The subfamily Fissurellinae, common name the keyhole limpets and slit limpets, is a taxonomic subfamily of limpet-like sea snails, marine gastropod molluscs in the family Fissurellidae.

Of the three subfamilies in the Fissurellidae, the subfamily Fissurellinae is the most recently evolved; its earliest known species date back to the Cenozoic.

The following genera in this subfamily have characteristically a body that tends to be larger than the shell.

- Amblychilepas
- Dendrofissurella
- Medusafissurella

They have sometimes been confused with genera in the emarginuline tribe Fissurellideini.

Other genera include : Altrix - Clathrosepta - Cornisepta - Cosmetalepas - Dendrofissurella - Elegidion (synonym of Diodora J. E. Gray, 1821) - Fissurella - Laevinesta - Lucapina - Macroschisma - Manganesepta - Montfortula - Montfortulana - Parmaphoridea - Parmophoridea - Profundisepta

The characteristics that distinguish them from the subfamily Emarginulidae are the following :

- the rachidian plate of the radula has a broad base and a narrow tip
- the outer lateral tooth in the radula is so long that it is aligned with the lateral teeth from the row above
- the shell muscle lacks an inwardly directed hook-shaped process.

A molecular phylogeny however has shown that Fissurellinae (Diodora and Fissurella were examined) is paraphyletic with respect to Emarginulinae. This is somewhat surprising as the subfamily Emarginulinae (shells with an open slit) is generally accepted to be basal to the subfamily Fissurellinae (shells with an apical opening)
