= E. concinna =

E. concinna may refer to:

- Emarginula concinna, a sea snail
- Eragrostis concinna, a true grass
- Eucalyptus concinna, a dicotyledon plant
- Euphonia concinna, a Colombian bird
- Eupithecia concinna, a Nepalese moth
