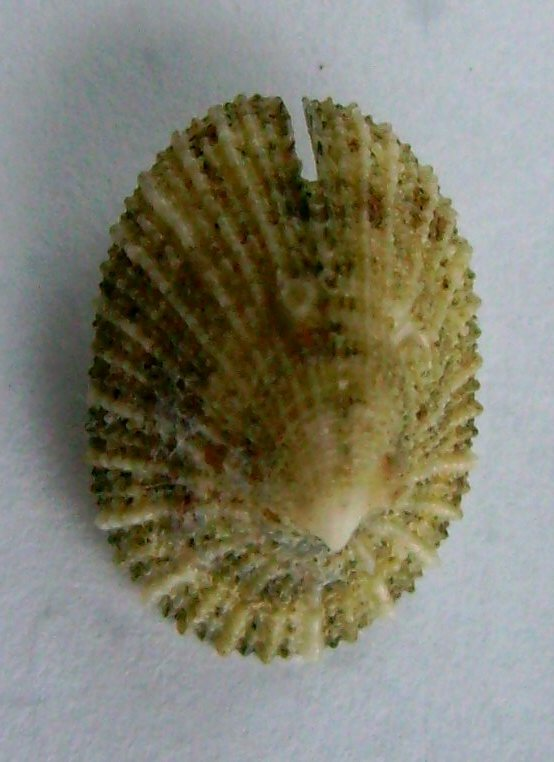
- Emarginula striatula

Scientific classification
- Kingdom: Animalia
- Phylum: Mollusca
- Class: Gastropoda
- Subclass: Vetigastropoda
- Order: Lepetellida
- Superfamily: Fissurelloidea
- Family: Fissurellidae
- Subfamily: Emarginulinae
- Genus: Emarginula; Lamarck, 1801

Type species
- Emarginula (Emarginula) conica Lamarck, 1801

Species
- See text.

Synonyms
- Emarginula (Emarginula) Lamarck, 1801· accepted, alternate representation; Emarginula (Subzeidora) Iredale, 1924· accepted, alternate representation; Emarginulus Montfort, 1810; Entomella Cotton, 1945; Notamella Cotton, 1957; Semperia Crosse, 1867; Subzeidora Iredale, 1924

= Emarginula =

Genus of gastropods

Emarginula is a genus of small keyhole limpets, marine gastropod molluscs in the family Fissurellidae.

== Description ==
The oval shell is obliquely conical with a backward-pointing recurved apex. There is a deep incision in the anterior margin. A distinct anal fasciole extends upwards from this incision. The surface is latticed, sculptured with radial ribs. There is no septum inside.

=== Radula ===
The radula has a dental formula of [many].1.4.1.4.1.[many], with a wide, rectangular, acuspate rachidian tooth. The various genera have a few dozen rows of teeth.

== Species ==
According to the World Register of Marine Species (WoRMS), species within the genus Emarginula include:

- Emarginula adamsiana Sowerby II in Adams & Sowerby II, 1863
- Emarginula adriatica Costa O.G., 1829
- Emarginula agulhasensis Thiele, 1925
- Emarginula alba Watson, 1897
- Emarginula amyda Shikama, 1962
- Emarginula angusta McLean, 1970
- Emarginula annielangleitae Poppe & Tagaro, 2020
- Emarginula apolonia Pacaud, 2015
- † Emarginula auversiensis Deshayes, 1861
- Emarginula bajula Hedley, 1913
- Emarginula balicasagensis Poppe & Tagaro, 2020
- Emarginula bellula A. Adams, 1852
- Emarginula bicancellata Montrouzier, 1860
- Emarginula bonfittoi Smriglio & Mariottini, 2001
- Emarginula boucheti Poppe & Tagaro, 2020
- † Emarginula brebioni Ceulemans, Van Dingenen & Landau, 2016
- Emarginula camilla Melvill & Standen, 1903
- Emarginula candida Adams, 1852
- Emarginula capuloidea G. Nevill & H. Nevill, 1869
- † Emarginula carezi de Laubrière, 1881
- Emarginula choristes Dall, 1925
- Emarginula christiaensi Piani, 1985
- Emarginula circumalbum Poppe & Tagaro, 2020
- † Emarginula clathrata Deshayes, 1824
- † Emarginula clathrataeformis Eichwald, 1830
- Emarginula colipanoae Poppe & Tagaro, 2020
- Emarginula compta Habe, 1953
- Emarginula concinna Adams, 1852
- Emarginula connectens Thiele, 1915
- Emarginula connelli Kilburn, 1978
- Emarginula convexa Hedley, 1907
- † Emarginula costata Lamarck, 1803
- Emarginula costulata Deshayes, 1863
- Emarginula crassa Sowerby I, 1812
- Emarginula crassicostata Sowerby II in Adams & Sowerby II, 1863
- Emarginula cucullata A. Adams, 1852
- Emarginula curvamen Iredale, 1925
- Emarginula curvata Schepman, 1908
- Emarginula cuvieri Audouin, 1827 (species inquirenda)
- Emarginula decorata Deshayes, 1863
- † Emarginula delicatissima Chapman & Gabriel, 1923
- Emarginula delonguevilleae Poppe & Tagaro, 2020
- † Emarginula dennanti Chapman & Gabriel, 1923
- Emarginula devota Thiele, 1915
- Emarginula dictya McLean, 1970
- † Emarginula didactica Ludbrook, 1956
- † Emarginula dilatoria Ludbrook, 1956
- Emarginula dilecta Adams, 1852
- Emarginula divae (van Aartsen & Carrozza, 1995)
- Emarginula dubia Schepman, 1908 (accepted > unreplaced junior homonym, non Emarginula dubia Defrance, 1819)
- Emarginula dujardini Dollfus & Dautzenberg, 1886 †
- † Emarginula espibosensis Lozouet, 1999
- † Emarginula exigua Trautschold, 1866
- Emarginula fenestrella Deshayes, 1863
- Emarginula fissura (Linnaeus, 1758) - slit limpet
- † Emarginula fossorensis Lozouet, 1999
- Emarginula foveolata Schepman, 1908
  - Emarginula foveolata fugitai Habe, 1953
- † Emarginula foveolata Gerasimov, 1955 (accepted > unreplaced junior homonym)
- Emarginula fragilis Yokoyama, 1920
- Emarginula fuliginea Adams, 1851
- Emarginula gabensis (Gabriel, 1961)
- Emarginula galericulata A. Adams, 1852
- † Emarginula galeriformis Marwick, 1928
- † Emarginula gigantea Poppe, 2008
- †Emarginula guerangeri A. d'Orbigny, 1843
- Emarginula gustavi Poppe & Tagaro, 2020
- Emarginula hataii Habe, 1953
- Emarginula hawaiiensis Dall, 1895
- † Emarginula haweraensis Powell, 1931
- Emarginula hosoyai Habe, 1953
- Emarginula huzardii (Payraudeau, 1826)
- Emarginula icosisculpta Simone & Cunha, 2014
- Emarginula imaizumi Dall, 1926
- Emarginula imella Dall, 1926
- Emarginula janae Cossignani, 2020
- Emarginula japonica Sowerby II in Adams & Sowerby II, 1863
- Emarginula jungcheni K.-Y. Lai, 2019
- † Emarginula kaiparica Laws, 1939
- † Emarginula kaiwarensis Bandel, Gründel & P. A. Maxwell, 2000 †
- † Emarginula karuna Das, Bardhan & Lahiri, 1999
- Emarginula kashimaensis Shikama, 1962
- † Emarginula komitica Laws, 1939
- Emarginula koon Kilburn, 1978
- † Emarginula ladowae Eichman, 1955
- Emarginula lata J.R.C. Quoy & J.P. Gaimard, 1834 ((uncertain, status in recent literature not researched)
- Emarginula lentiginosa D. G. Herbert, 2024
- Emarginula liuzzii Poppe & Tagaro, 2020
- Emarginula longifissa Sowerby II, 1866
- Emarginula lorenzoi Giusti & Micali, 2019
- Emarginula macclurgi Kilburn, 1978
- Emarginula mactanensis Poppe & Tagaro, 2020
- Emarginula maculata Adams in Adams & Sowerby II, 1863
- Emarginula margarita Poppe & Tagaro, 2020
- † Emarginula mariae Cossmann, 1888
- † Emarginula maudensis Chapman & Gabriel, 1923
- Emarginula micans Adams, 1852
- Emarginula montrouzieri Souverbie, 1872
- Emarginula multisquamosa Schepman, 1908
- Emarginula multistriata Jeffreys, 1882
- Emarginula natalensis Barnard, 1963
- Emarginula nigromaculata (Thiele, 1930)
- Emarginula nodulicostata D. G. Herbert, 2024
- Emarginula nordica Pérez Farfante, 1947 - northern emarginula
- † Emarginula oblonga Sandberger, 1859
- Emarginula obovata Adams, 1852
- Emarginula octaviana Coen, 1939
- Emarginula oppressa Barnard, 1963
- Emarginula paivana (Crosse, 1867)
- Emarginula papilionacea G. Nevill & H. Nevill, 1869
- Emarginula patula Cotton, 1930
- † Emarginula paucicostata Laws, 1936
- Emarginula paucipunctata Schepman, 1908
- † Emarginula pelagica Passy, 1832
- Emarginula philippinensis Poppe & Tagaro, 2020
- Emarginula phrixodes Dall, 1927 - ruffled emarginula
- Emarginula pittensis Marwick, 1928
- Emarginula poppeorum Romani & Crocetta, 2017
- † Emarginula praesicula Lozouet, 1999
- Emarginula puncticulata Adams, 1852
- Emarginula punctulum Piani, 1980
- † Emarginula punctura S. Wood, 1848
- Emarginula pustula Thiele in Küster, 1913
- Emarginula quadrata Poppe & Tagaro, 2020
- † Emarginula radiocostata Kiel & Bandel, 2000
- Emarginula regia Habe, 1953
- Emarginula retecosa Adams, 1851
- Emarginula retrogyra D. G. Herbert, 2024
- Emarginula rollandi P. Fischer, 1857 (uncertain: status in recent literature not researched)
- Emarginula rosea Bell, 1824
- Emarginula salebrosa D. G. Herbert, 2024
- † Emarginula sanctaecaatharine Passy, 1832
- Emarginula scabricostata A. Adams, 1852
- Emarginula scabriuscula Adams, 1852
- Emarginula sicula Gray, 1825 - dagger emarginula
- Emarginula sinica Lu, 1986
- Emarginula solidula Costa, 1829
- Emarginula souverbiana Pilsbry, 1890
- Emarginula spinosa Deshayes, 1863
- † Emarginula squammata Grateloup, 1836
- † Emarginula striatissima Traub, 1979
- Emarginula striatula Quoy and Gaimard, 1834 - dagger emarginula
- Emarginula sublaevis Schepman, 1908
- Emarginula subtilitexta Verco, 1908
- Emarginula superba Hedley, 1906
- Emarginula suspira Simone & Cunha, 2014
- Emarginula tenera Locard, 1892
- † Emarginula teneraeformis Lozouet, 1999
- Emarginula tenuicostata Sowerby II, 1863
- Emarginula teramachii Habe, 1953
- Emarginula textilis Gould, 1859 in 1859-61
- Emarginula thomasi Crosse, 1864
- Emarginula thorektes Kilburn, 1978
- Emarginula tosaensis Habe, 1953
- †Emarginula transenna Tenison Woods, 1877
- Emarginula tuberculosa Libassi, 1859 - tuberculate emarginula
- Emarginula undulata Melvill & Standen, 1903
- Emarginula velascoensis Shasky, 1961
- Emarginula velascoi Rehder, 1980
- Emarginula viridibrunneis Poppe & Tagaro, 2020
- Emarginula viridicana Herbert & Kilburn, 1985
- Emarginula viridis Poppe & Tagaro, 2020
- † Emarginula wannonensis G. F. Harris, 1897
- † Emarginula washingtoniana Squires & Goedert, 1994
- Emarginula xishaensis Lu, 1986
- Emarginula yangeorum Poppe & Tagaro, 2020

== Synonyms ==
- Emarginula altilis Gould, 1859: synonym of Variemarginula punctata (A. Adams, 1852)
- Emarginula amitina Iredale, 1925: synonym of Emarginula dilecta A. Adams, 1852
- Emarginula angustata Thiele, 1915: synonym of Tugali decussata A. Adams, 1852
- Emarginula arabica A. Adams, 1852: synonym of Octomarginula arabica (A. Adams, 1852)
- Emarginula arconatii Issel, 1869: synonym of Montfortista panhi (Quoy & Gaimard, 1834)
- Emarginula australis Quoy & Gaimard, 1834: synonym of Montfortia subemarginata (Blainville, 1819)
- Emarginula bella Gabb, 1865: synonym of Scelidotoma bella (Gabb, 1865)
- Emarginula biangulata Sowerby III, 1901: synonym of Emarginella biangulata (G. B. Sowerby III, 1901)
- † Emarginula blainvillii Defrance, 1825: synonym of † Rimula blainvillii (Defrance, 1825)
- Emarginula brevirimata Deshayes, 1862: synonym of Montfortula brevirimata (Deshayes, 1862)
- Emarginula clathrata A. Adams & Reeve, 1850: synonym of Montfortista panhi (Quoy & Gaimard, 1834)
- Emarginula clathrata Pease, 1863: synonym of Emarginula dilecta A. Adams, 1852
- Emarginula conica Lamarck, 1801: synonym of Emarginula fissura (Linnaeus, 1758)
- Emarginula conica Schumacher, 1817 non Lamarck, 1801: synonym of Emarginula rosea Bell, 1824
- Emarginula dentigera Heilprin, 1889: synonym of Hemimarginula dentigera (Heilprin, 1889)
- Emarginula elata Locard, 1898: synonym of Emarginula christiaensi Piani, 1985
- Emarginula elongata O. G. Costa, 1829: synonym of Emarginula octaviana Coen, 1939
- Emarginula eximia A. Adams, 1852: synonym of Emarginella eximia (A. Adams, 1852)
- Emarginula flindersi Cotton, 1930: synonym of Emarginula convexa Hedley, 1907
- Emarginula fuliginea Kuroda, 1941: synonym of Variemarginula variegata (A. Adams, 1852)
- Emarginula guernei Dautzenberg & Fischer, 1896: synonym of Emarginula tuberculosa Libassi, 1859
- Emarginula hedleyi Thiele, 1915: synonym of Emarginula candida A. Adams, 1852
- Emarginula incisula(sic): synonym of Emarginella incisura (A. Adams, 1852)
- Emarginula incisura A. Adams, 1852: synonym of Emarginella incisura (A. Adams, 1852)
- Emarginula kimberti Cotton, 1930: synonym of Laeviemarginula kimberti (Cotton, 1930)
- Emarginula modesta H. Adams, 1872: synonym of Hemimarginula modesta (H. Adams, 1872)
- Emarginula muelleri Forbes & Hanley, 1849: synonym of Emarginula fissura (Linnaeus, 1758)
- Emarginula ostheimerae Abbott, 1958: synonym of Octomarginula ostheimerae (Abbott, 1958)
- Emarginula panhi Quoy & Gaimard, 1834: synonym of Montfortista panhi (Quoy & Gaimard, 1834)
- Emarginula papillosa Risso 1826: synonym of Emarginula huzardii Payraudeau, 1826
- Emarginula parmophoidea Quoy & Gaimard, 1834: synonym of Tugali elegans Gray, 1843
- Emarginula peasei Thiele, 1915: synonym of Emarginula dilecta A. Adams, 1852
- Emarginula phrygium Herbert & Kilburn, 1985: synonym of Agariste phrygium (Herbert & Kilburn, 1986) (original combination)
- Emarginula picta Dunker, 1860: synonym of Montfortula picta (Dunker, 1860)
- Emarginula pileata Gould, 1859: synonym of Variemarginula punctata (A. Adams, 1852)
- Emarginula pileum Heilprin, 1889: synonym of Hemimarginula pileum (Heilprin, 1889)
- Emarginula planulata A. Adams, 1852: synonym of Emarginella planulata (A. Adams, 1852)
- Emarginula polygonalis A. Adams, 1852: synonym of Hemitoma polygonalis (A. Adams, 1852)
- Emarginula pulchreclathrata Tomlin, 1932: synonym of Emarginula agulhasensis Thiele, 1925
- Emarginula pumila A. Adams, 1852: synonym of Hemimarginula pumila (A. Adams, 1852)
- Emarginula punctata A. Adams, 1852: synonym of Variemarginula punctata (A. Adams, 1852)
- Emarginula reticulata Sowerby, 1813: synonym of Emarginula fissura (Linnaeus, 1758)
- Emarginula rugosa Quoy & Gaimard, 1834: synonym of Montfortula rugosa (Quoy & Gaimard, 1834)
- Emarginula scutellata Deshayes, 1863: synonym of Octomarginula scutellata (Deshayes, 1863)
- Emarginula sibogae Schepman, 1908: synonym of Emarginella sibogae (Schepman, 1908)
- Emarginula simpla Christiaens, 1987: synonym of Hemimarginula simpla (Christiaens, 1987)
- Emarginula stellata A. Adams, 1852: synonym of Montfortula rugosa (Quoy & Gaimard, 1834)
- Emarginula subclathrata Pilsbry, 1890: synonym of Emarginula dilecta A. Adams, 1852
- Emarginula subemarginata Blainville, 1819: synonym of Montfortia subemarginata (Blainville, 1819)
- Emarginula subrugosa Thiele, 1916: synonym of Hemimarginula subrugosa (Thiele, 1916)
- Emarginula sulcifera A. Adams, 1852: synonym of Montfortulana sulcifera (A. Adams, 1852)
- Emarginula tricarinata Pilsbry, 1890: synonym of Montfortista panhi (Quoy & Gaimard, 1834)
- Emarginula tricostata G.B. Sowerby I, 1823: synonym of Hemitoma octoradiata (Gmelin, 1791)
- Emarginula vadososinuata Yokoyama, 1922: synonym of Tugalina vadososinuata (Yokoyama, 1922)
- Emarginula vadum Barnard, 1963: synonym of Emarginula undulata Melvill & Standen, 1903
- Emarginula variegata A. Adams, 1852: synonym of Variemarginula variegata (A. Adams, 1852)
