= Choristes =

Choristes may refer to:

- The Chorus (2004 film), a film whose French title is Les Choristes
- a synonym for the plant genus Deppea
- a synonym for the sea snail genus Amauropsis

== See also ==
- Emarginula choristes, a species of sea snails
