= Emarginula adamsiana =

Scientific classification
- Kingdom: Animalia
- Phylum: Mollusca
- Class: Gastropoda
- Subclass: Vetigastropoda
- Order: Lepetellida
- Family: Fissurellidae
- Subfamily: Emarginulinae
- Genus: Emarginula
- Species: E. adamsiana

Binomial name
- Emarginula adamsiana Sowerby II, 1863

Synonyms
- Emarginula (Emarginula) adamsiana Sowerby II, 1863

Species of gastropod

Emarginula adamsiana is a species of sea snail, a marine gastropod mollusk in the family Fissurellidae, the keyhole limpets and slit limpets.

== Distribution ==
This marine species occurs off Japan.
