= Emarginula imaizumi =

Scientific classification
- Kingdom: Animalia
- Phylum: Mollusca
- Class: Gastropoda
- Subclass: Vetigastropoda
- Order: Lepetellida
- Family: Fissurellidae
- Subfamily: Emarginulinae
- Genus: Emarginula
- Species: E. imaizumi

Binomial name
- Emarginula imaizumi Dall, 1926

Species of gastropod

Emarginula imaizumi is a species of sea snail, a marine gastropod mollusk in the family Fissurellidae, the keyhole limpets and slit limpets.

== Distribution ==
This species is seen in Lu-Tao and Orchid Island of Taiwan, as well as the near coast of mainland China and Japan.
