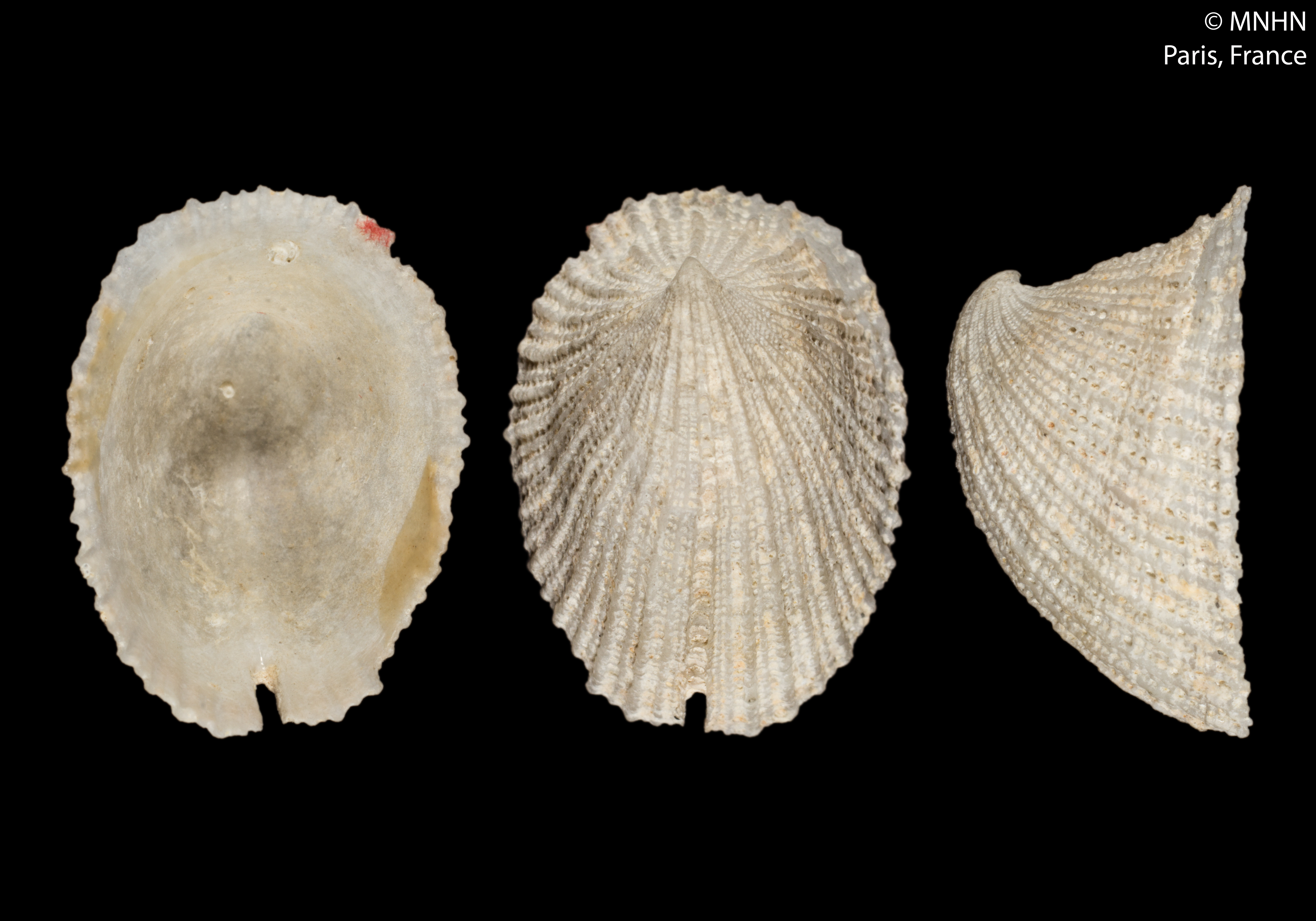

Scientific classification
- Kingdom: Animalia
- Phylum: Mollusca
- Class: Gastropoda
- Subclass: Vetigastropoda
- Order: Lepetellida
- Family: Fissurellidae
- Genus: Emarginula
- Species: E. sicula

Binomial name
- Emarginula sicula Gray, 1825

Synonyms
- Emarginula cancellata Philippi, 1836; Emarginula curvirostris Deshayes, 1830; Emarginula depressa Bellini, 1929; Emarginula reticulata Risso, 1826; Emarginula rosea Bellini, 1929; Emarginula sicula var. major Pallary, 1900; Emarginula squamulosa Aradas, 1846

= Emarginula sicula =

Species of gastropod

Emarginula sicula is a species of sea snail, a marine gastropod mollusk in the family Fissurellidae, the keyhole limpets.

== Distribution ==
This species occurs in the Mediterranean Sea off Sicily.
