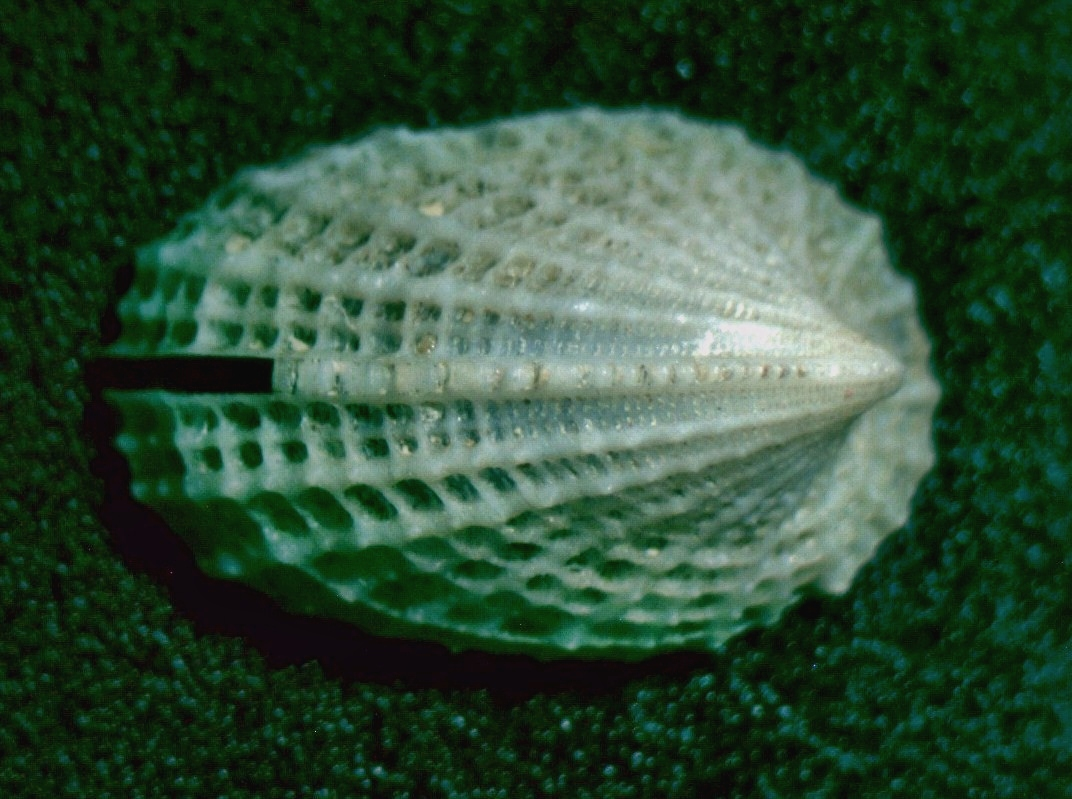
- Top view of a shell of Emarginula octaviana

Scientific classification
- Kingdom: Animalia
- Phylum: Mollusca
- Class: Gastropoda
- Subclass: Vetigastropoda
- Order: Lepetellida
- Family: Fissurellidae
- Genus: Emarginula
- Species: E. octaviana

Binomial name
- Emarginula octaviana Coen, 1939

Synonyms
- Emarginula elongata O. G. Costa, 1829 (preoccupied name)

= Emarginula octaviana =

Species of gastropod

Emarginula octaviana is a species of sea snail, a marine gastropod mollusk in the family Fissurellidae, the keyhole limpets.

== Description ==
The size of the white shell varies between 7 mm and 15 mm. The shell has an oval-elongate contour and moderately elevated profile. The apex is close to the posterior margin, moderately coiled and not overhanging. The sculpture of the shell shows high, strong radial costae, some smaller radial costae intercalated on the sides, and comarginal lamellae forming a very coarse lattice with the costae. The slit in the shell is broad and rectangular, extending over 1/5 of the distance to apex.

== Distribution ==
This species occurs in the Mediterranean Sea and in the Atlantic Ocean off the Canary Islands, the Azores and from Southern Spain to Morocco.
