= Emarginula gabensis =

Scientific classification
- Kingdom: Animalia
- Phylum: Mollusca
- Class: Gastropoda
- Subclass: Vetigastropoda
- Order: Lepetellida
- Family: Fissurellidae
- Subfamily: Emarginulinae
- Genus: Emarginula
- Species: E. gabensis

Binomial name
- Emarginula gabensis (Gabriel, 1962)

Synonyms
- Notomella gabensis Gabriel, 1962

Species of gastropod

Emarginula gabensis is a species of sea snail, a marine gastropod mollusk in the family Fissurellidae, the keyhole limpets and slit limpets.
