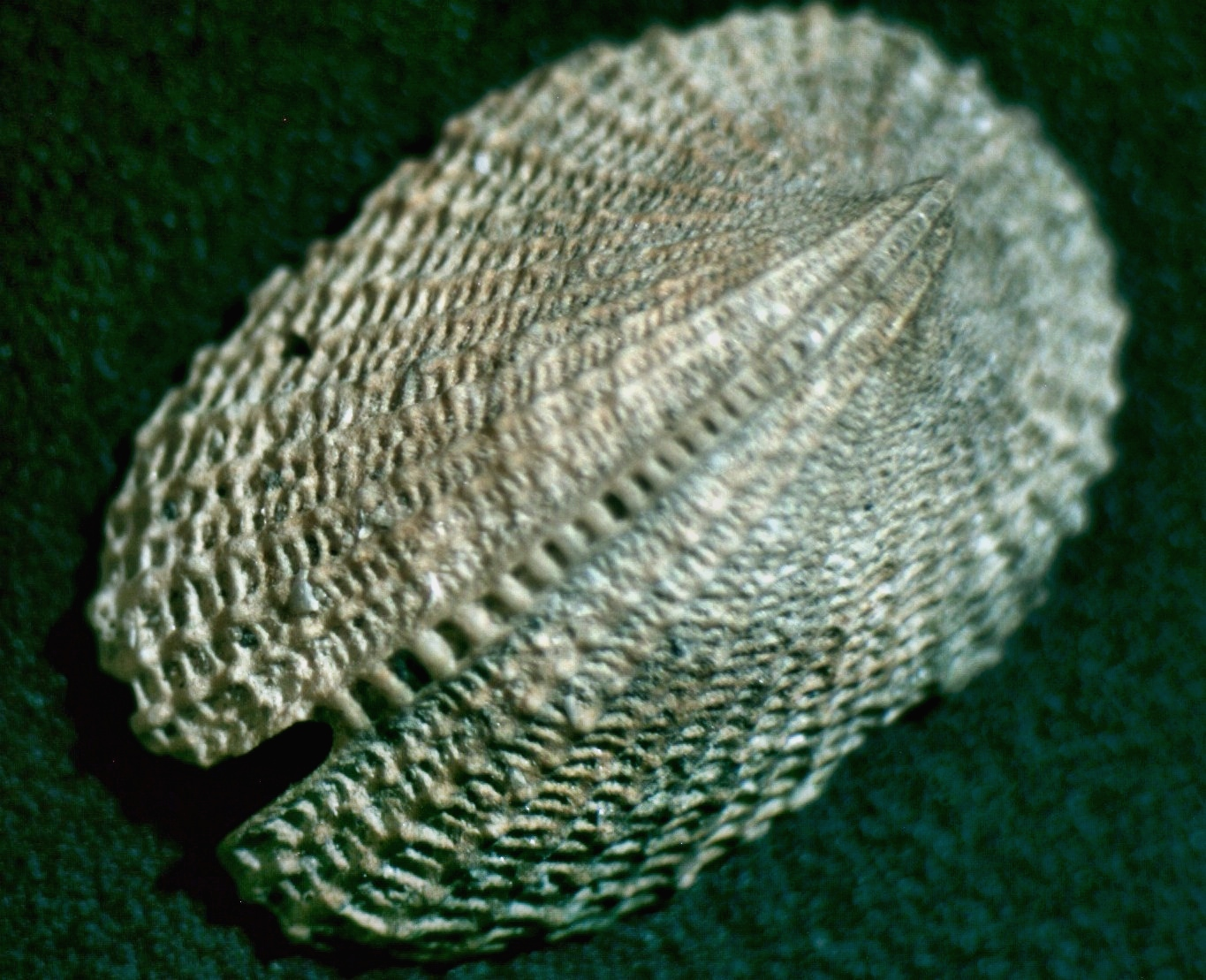
- Dorsal view of a shell of Emarginula dilecta

Scientific classification
- Kingdom: Animalia
- Phylum: Mollusca
- Class: Gastropoda
- Subclass: Vetigastropoda
- Order: Lepetellida
- Family: Fissurellidae
- Subfamily: Emarginulinae
- Genus: Emarginula
- Species: E. dilecta

Binomial name
- Emarginula dilecta Adams, 1852

Synonyms
- Emarginula amitina Iredale, 1925; Emarginula clathrata Pease, 1863; Emarginula peasei Thiele, 1915; Emarginula subclathrata Pilsbry, 1890

= Emarginula dilecta =

Species of mollusc

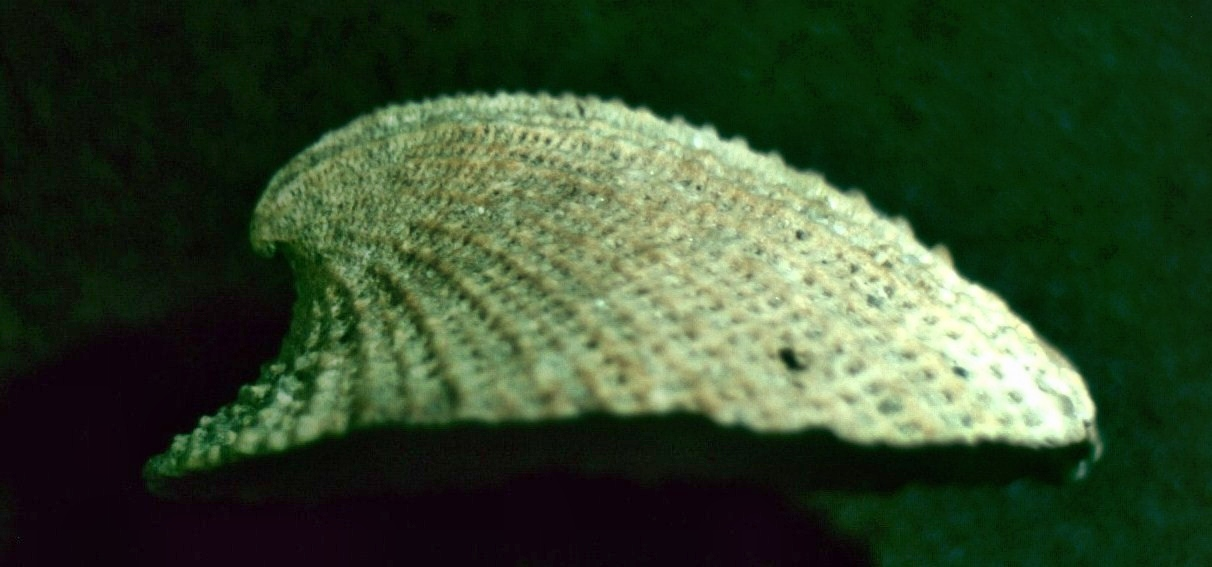
Lateral view of a shell of Emarginula dilecta

Emarginula dilecta is a species of sea snail, a marine gastropod mollusk in the family Fissurellidae, the keyhole limpets and slit limpets.

== Distribution ==
This species occurs in the following locations:

- Chagos
