= Emarginula nordica =

Scientific classification
- Kingdom: Animalia
- Phylum: Mollusca
- Class: Gastropoda
- Subclass: Vetigastropoda
- Order: Lepetellida
- Family: Fissurellidae
- Genus: Emarginula
- Species: E. nordica

Binomial name
- Emarginula nordica Pérez Farfante, 1947

Species of gastropod

Emarginula nordica, common name the northern emarginula, is a species of sea snail, a marine gastropod mollusk in the family Fissurellidae, the keyhole limpets.
