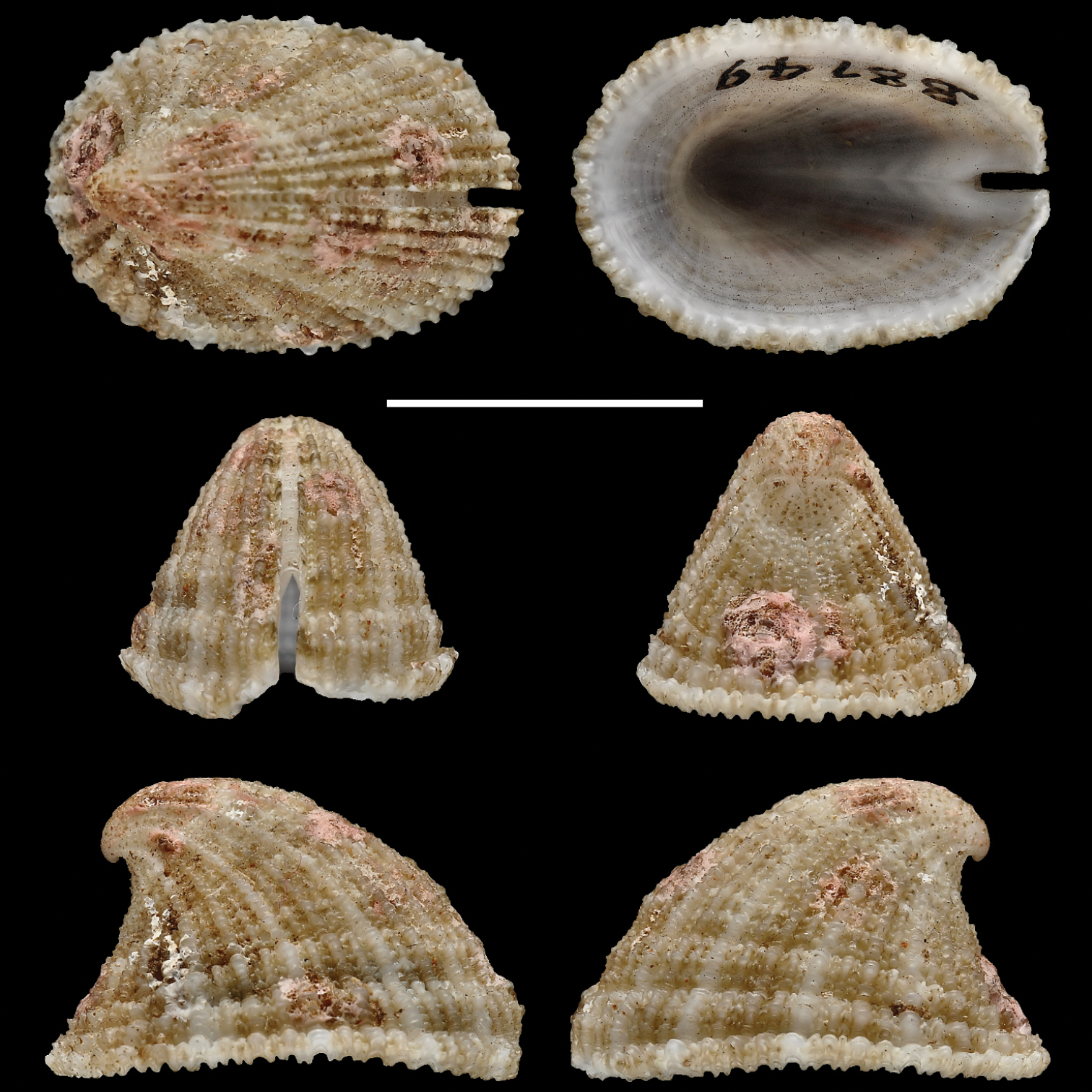

Scientific classification
- Kingdom: Animalia
- Phylum: Mollusca
- Class: Gastropoda
- Subclass: Vetigastropoda
- Order: Lepetellida
- Family: Fissurellidae
- Subfamily: Emarginulinae
- Genus: Emarginula
- Species: E. viridicana

Binomial name
- Emarginula viridicana Herbert & Kilburn, 1986

= Emarginula viridicana =

Species of gastropod

Emarginula viridicana is a species of sea snail, a marine gastropod mollusk in the family Fissurellidae, which includes keyhole limpets and slit limpets.
