= Emarginula imella =

Scientific classification
- Kingdom: Animalia
- Phylum: Mollusca
- Class: Gastropoda
- Subclass: Vetigastropoda
- Order: Lepetellida
- Family: Fissurellidae
- Subfamily: Emarginulinae
- Genus: Emarginula
- Species: E. imella

Binomial name
- Emarginula imella (Dall, 1926)

Synonyms
- Emarginula imaizumi var. imella Dall, 1926

Species of gastropod

Emarginula imella is a species of sea snail, a marine gastropod mollusk in the family Fissurellidae, the keyhole limpets and slit limpets.
