= Emarginula agulhasensis =

Scientific classification
- Kingdom: Animalia
- Phylum: Mollusca
- Class: Gastropoda
- Subclass: Vetigastropoda
- Order: Lepetellida
- Family: Fissurellidae
- Subfamily: Emarginulinae
- Genus: Emarginula
- Species: E. agulhasensis

Binomial name
- Emarginula agulhasensis Thiele, 1925

Synonyms
- Emarginula pulchreclathrata Thiele, 1932

Species of gastropod

Emarginula agulhasensis is a species of sea snail, a marine gastropod mollusk in the family Fissurellidae, the keyhole limpets and slit limpets.

== Description ==
The length of the shell attains 6.25 mm, its diameter 4 mm.
