= Emarginula regia =

Scientific classification
- Kingdom: Animalia
- Phylum: Mollusca
- Class: Gastropoda
- Subclass: Vetigastropoda
- Order: Lepetellida
- Family: Fissurellidae
- Subfamily: Emarginulinae
- Genus: Emarginula
- Species: E. regia

Binomial name
- Emarginula regia Habe, 1953

Species of gastropod

Emarginula regia is a species of sea snail, a marine gastropod mollusk in the family Fissurellidae, the keyhole limpets and slit limpets.
