= Emarginula oppressa =

Scientific classification
- Kingdom: Animalia
- Phylum: Mollusca
- Class: Gastropoda
- Subclass: Vetigastropoda
- Order: Lepetellida
- Family: Fissurellidae
- Subfamily: Emarginulinae
- Genus: Emarginula
- Species: E. oppressa

Binomial name
- Emarginula oppressa Barnard, 1963

Synonyms
- Emarginella oppressa (Barnard, 1963)

Species of gastropod

Emarginula oppressa is a species of sea snail, a marine gastropod mollusk in the family Fissurellidae, the keyhole limpets and slit limpets.
