= Emarginula adriatica =

Scientific classification
- Kingdom: Animalia
- Phylum: Mollusca
- Class: Gastropoda
- Subclass: Vetigastropoda
- Order: Lepetellida
- Family: Fissurellidae
- Genus: Emarginula
- Species: E. adriatica

Binomial name
- Emarginula adriatica Costa O.G., 1829

Species of gastropod

Emarginula adriatica is a species of sea snail, a marine gastropod mollusk in the family Fissurellidae, the keyhole limpets.

== Description ==
The size of the shell varies between 7 mm and 15 mm.

== Distribution ==
This marine species occurs in the Mediterranean Sea and in the Atlantic Ocean from the Bay of Biscay to Madeira.
