= Emarginula angusta =

Scientific classification
- Kingdom: Animalia
- Phylum: Mollusca
- Class: Gastropoda
- Subclass: Vetigastropoda
- Order: Lepetellida
- Family: Fissurellidae
- Subfamily: Emarginulinae
- Genus: Emarginula
- Species: E. angusta

Binomial name
- Emarginula angusta McLean, 1970

Species of gastropod

Emarginula angusta is a species of sea snail, a marine gastropod mollusk in the family Fissurellidae, the keyhole limpets and slit limpets.

== Description ==
The size of the shell varies between 4 mm and 7 mm.

== Distribution ==
This marine species occurs off the Islas Desventurados, Chile.
