= Emarginula divae =

Scientific classification
- Kingdom: Animalia
- Phylum: Mollusca
- Class: Gastropoda
- Subclass: Vetigastropoda
- Order: Lepetellida
- Family: Fissurellidae
- Genus: Emarginula
- Species: E. divae

Binomial name
- Emarginula divae (van Aartsen & Carrozza, 1995)

Species of sea snail

Emarginula divae is a species of sea snail, a marine gastropod mollusk in the family Fissurellidae, the keyhole limpets.
