= Emarginula sinica =

Scientific classification
- Kingdom: Animalia
- Phylum: Mollusca
- Class: Gastropoda
- Subclass: Vetigastropoda
- Order: Lepetellida
- Family: Fissurellidae
- Subfamily: Emarginulinae
- Genus: Emarginula
- Species: E. sinica

Binomial name
- Emarginula sinica Lu, 1986

Species of gastropod

Emarginula sinica is a species of sea snail, a marine gastropod mollusk in the family Fissurellidae, the keyhole limpets and slit limpets.
