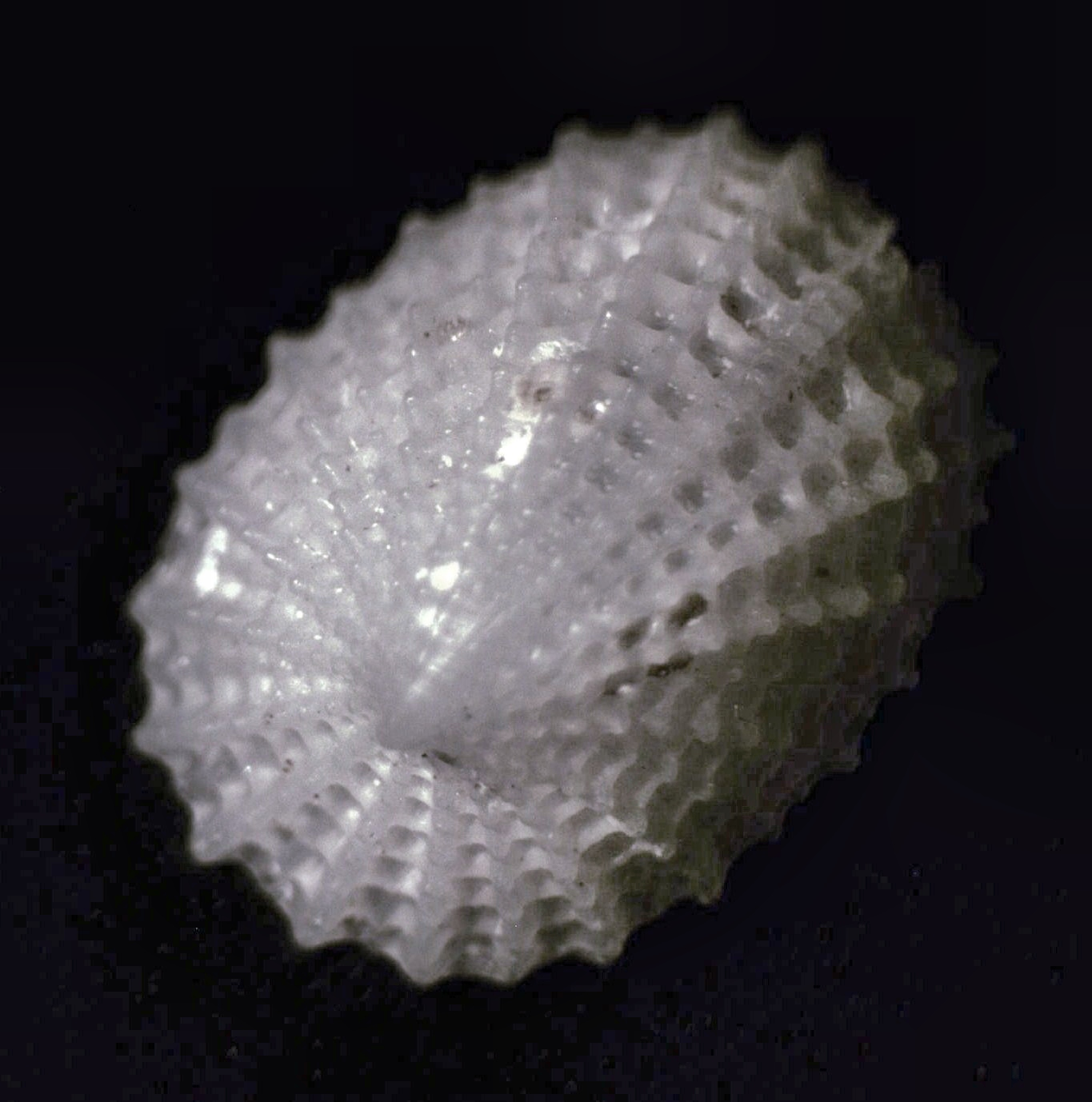
- The shell of Emarginula candida

Scientific classification
- Kingdom: Animalia
- Phylum: Mollusca
- Class: Gastropoda
- Subclass: Vetigastropoda
- Order: Lepetellida
- Family: Fissurellidae
- Subfamily: Emarginulinae
- Genus: Emarginula
- Species: E. candida

Binomial name
- Emarginula candida Adams, 1852

Synonyms
- Emarginula hedleyi Thiele, 1915

= Emarginula candida =

Species of gastropod

Emarginula candida is a species of sea snail, a marine gastropod mollusk in the family Fissurellidae, the keyhole limpets and slit limpets.

== Description ==
The size of the shell varies between 10 mm and 15 mm.

== Distribution ==
This marine species occurs off Queensland, Victoria, and Tasmania.
