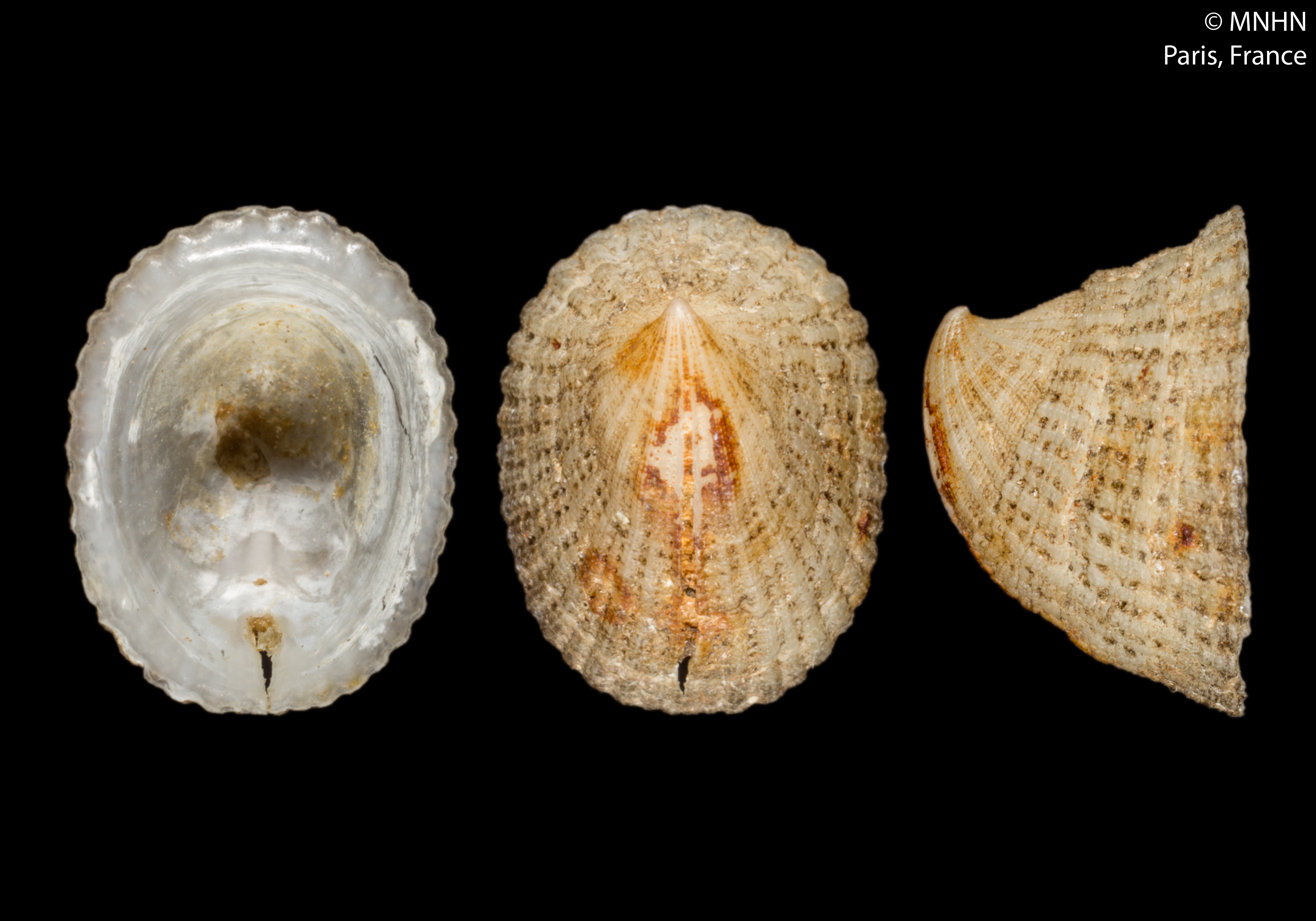
- Shell of Emarginula paivana (lectotype at MNHN, Paris)

Scientific classification
- Kingdom: Animalia
- Phylum: Mollusca
- Class: Gastropoda
- Subclass: Vetigastropoda
- Order: Lepetellida
- Family: Fissurellidae
- Genus: Emarginula
- Species: E. paivana

Binomial name
- Emarginula paivana (Crosse, 1867)

Synonyms
- Semperia paivana Crosse, 1867 (original combination)

= Emarginula paivana =

Species of gastropod

Emarginula paivana is a species of sea snail, a marine gastropod mollusk in the family Fissurellidae, the keyhole limpets.

== Distribution ==
This species occurs in the Atlantic Ocean off Madeira.
