= Emarginula amyda =

Scientific classification
- Kingdom: Animalia
- Phylum: Mollusca
- Class: Gastropoda
- Subclass: Vetigastropoda
- Order: Lepetellida
- Family: Fissurellidae
- Subfamily: Emarginulinae
- Genus: Emarginula
- Species: E. amyda

Binomial name
- Emarginula amyda Shikama, 1962

Species of gastropod

Emarginula amyda is a species of sea snail, a marine gastropod mollusk in the family Fissurellidae, the keyhole limpets and slit limpets.

== Distribution ==
This marine species occurs off Japan.
