= Emarginula nigromaculata =

Scientific classification
- Kingdom: Animalia
- Phylum: Mollusca
- Class: Gastropoda
- Subclass: Vetigastropoda
- Order: Lepetellida
- Family: Fissurellidae
- Subfamily: Emarginulinae
- Genus: Emarginula
- Species: E. nigromaculata

Binomial name
- Emarginula nigromaculata (Thiele, 1930)

Synonyms
- Emarginula nigromaculata Thiele, 1915; Emarginula fnigromaculata Thiele, 1930(misspelt)

Species of gastropod

Emarginula nigromaculata is a species of sea snail, a marine gastropod mollusk in the family Fissurellidae, the keyhole limpets and slit limpets.

Originally a member of the Order Archaeogastropoda, the species now belongs to Order Lepetellida.

== Distribution ==
This species is seen at Guishan Island of Toucheng Township, Yilan County, Taiwan and Enewetak Atoll of Marshall Islands in West Pacific Ocean. The length of the shell is around 10 mm.
