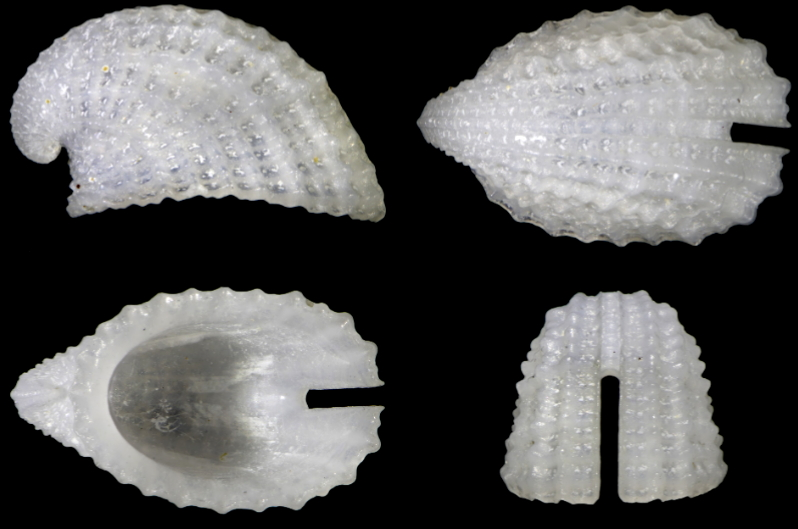
- Shell of Emarginula nodulicostata (holotype)

Scientific classification
- Kingdom: Animalia
- Phylum: Mollusca
- Class: Gastropoda
- Subclass: Vetigastropoda
- Order: Lepetellida
- Family: Fissurellidae
- Subfamily: Emarginulinae
- Genus: Emarginula
- Species: E. nodulicostata

Binomial name
- Emarginula nodulicostata D. G. Herbert, 2024

= Emarginula nodulicostata =

Species of gastropod

Emarginula nodulicostata is a species of sea snail, a marine gastropod mollusk in the family Fissurellidae, the keyhole limpets and slit limpets.

== Description ==
(Original description) Dimensions: the holotype measures 3.45 × 2.50 mm at the base, with a height of 2.25 mm (the largest specimen).

Shell: Very small (basal length up to 3.45 mm), relatively thick, with a strongly recurved apex extending well beyond the posterior margin of the base. The basal outline is evenly ovate (Length/Width ratio = 1.37–1.40), appearing slightly concave in side view, with moderate height (Height/Length ratio = 0.52–0.65). The dorsal profile is strongly convex in side view, with the posterior slope comprising about one-third of the shell’s height in adults. The anterior face is slightly flattened on either side of the slit, while the posterior slope is nearly vertical in the largest specimens, becoming less so in smaller ones. The protoconch is tucked under the recurved apex and is slightly twisted to the right.

The anterior slit is narrow and deep, approximately one-third the length of the anterior slope. The selenizone initially forms a broad mid-line rib with minimally raised margins, marked by coarse lunulae that project above these margins; in larger specimens, the selenizone becomes somewhat sunken near the slit. The remaining sculpture is relatively coarse and cancellate, consisting of approximately 16 primary radial ribs with narrower secondary ribs in between. Secondary ribs are stronger laterally and more slender between anterior ribs. The radial sculpture is intersected by coarse concentric ridges, with both radial and concentric elements of similar strength. The radial ribs are rounded and nodular at intersections with concentric ridges. Interstices between ribs and ridges are simple, forming square to concentrically elongate-rectangular shapes with paired intritacalx pits. The basal margin is distinctly crenulated at the ends of the radial ribs and noticeably broader posteriorly. Internally, a broad, low ridge underlies the selenizone posterior to the anterior slit, extending approximately two-thirds the slit length. The ridge itself has a shallow central furrow, with the interior of the apex barely visible in basal view.

Protoconch: Typically emarginuliform, consisting of a single whorl with a sharp, flared terminal lip and a finely flocculated granulation on the surface. Maximum diameter is approximately 140 μm.

Color: Uniformly milky white and somewhat translucent when fresh.

== Distribution ==
This marine species occurs on the Walters Shoals, a group of submerged mountains off the coast of Madagascar.
