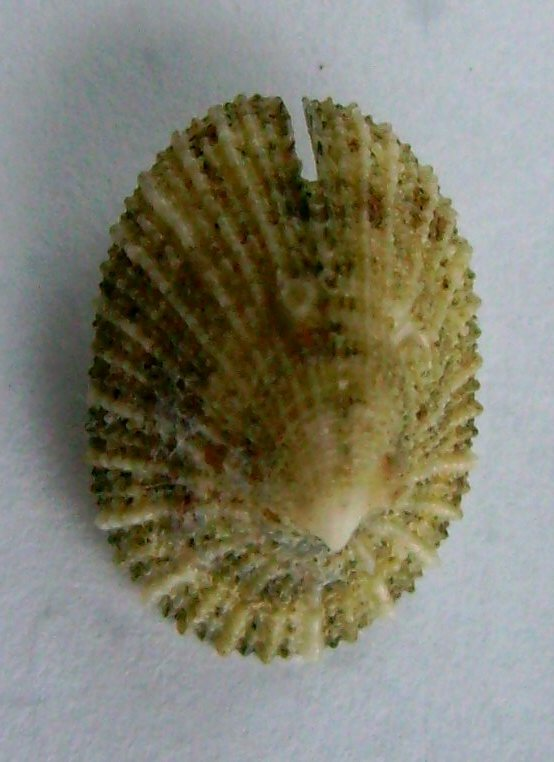

Scientific classification
- Kingdom: Animalia
- Phylum: Mollusca
- Class: Gastropoda
- Subclass: Vetigastropoda
- Order: Lepetellida
- Family: Fissurellidae
- Genus: Emarginula
- Species: E. striatula

Binomial name
- Emarginula striatula Quoy and Gaimard, 1834

Synonyms
- † Emarginula lophelia Beu, 1966; Emarginula striatula valentior Finlay, 1928

= Emarginula striatula =

Species of gastropod

Emarginula striatula is a species of slit limpet, a marine gastropod mollusc in the family Fissurellidae, the keyhole limpets and slit limpets.

== Distribution ==
This marine species is found only in the vicinity of New Zealand and surrounding islands.

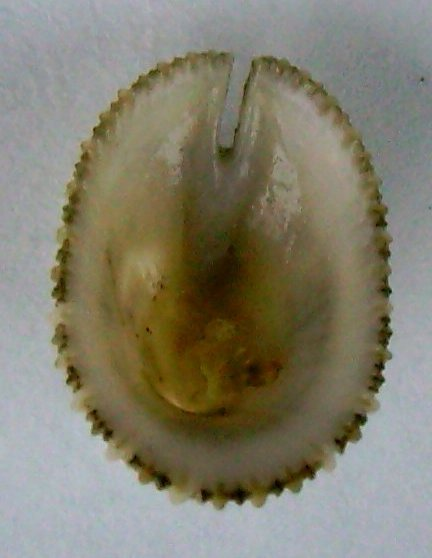
Emarginula striatula underside view

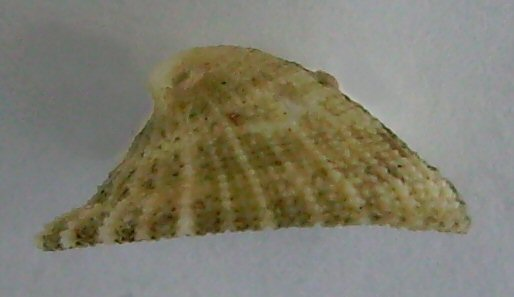
Emarginula striatula side view
