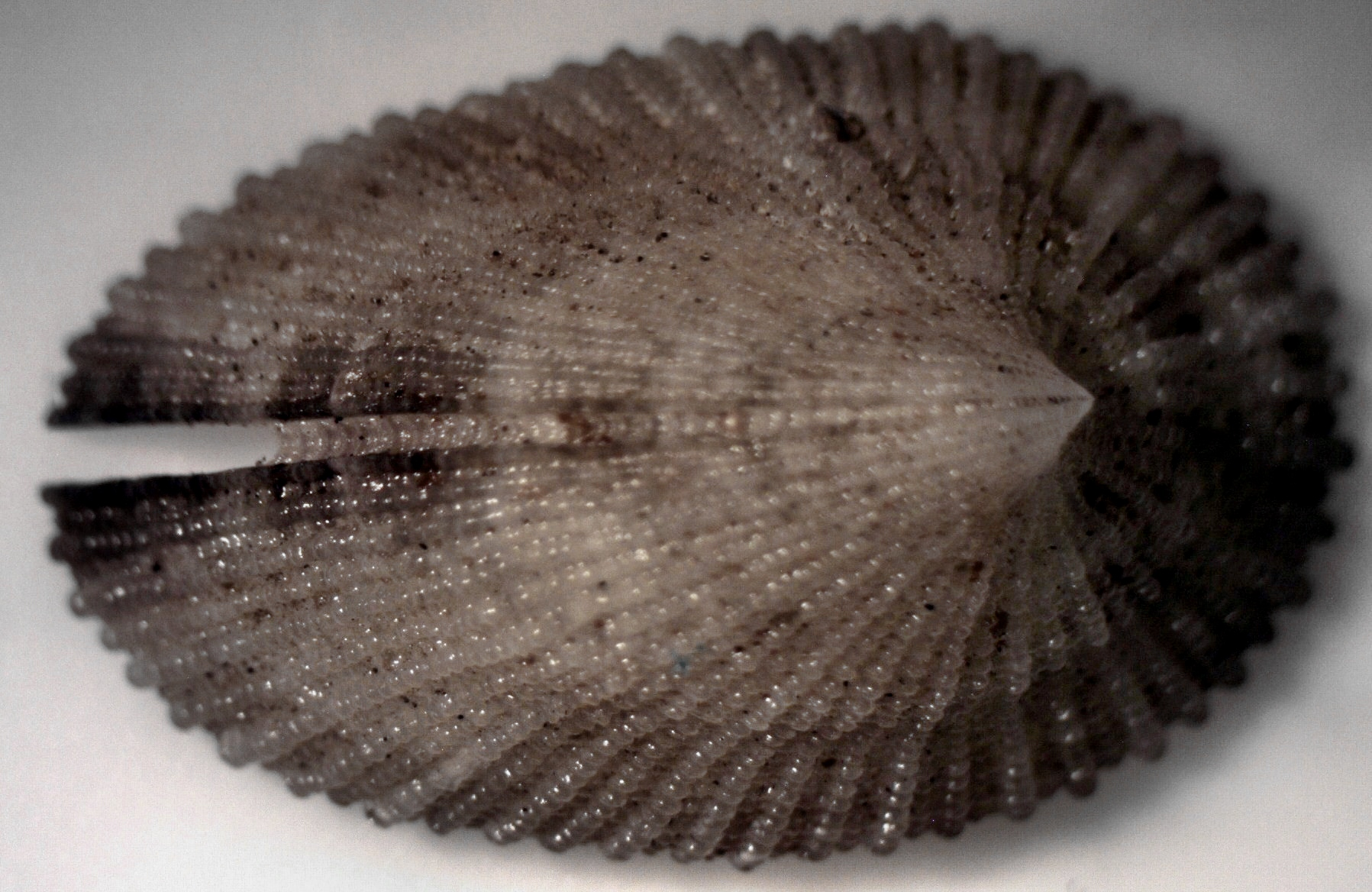
- Dorsal view of a shell of Emarginula maculata

Scientific classification
- Kingdom: Animalia
- Phylum: Mollusca
- Class: Gastropoda
- Subclass: Vetigastropoda
- Order: Lepetellida
- Family: Fissurellidae
- Subfamily: Emarginulinae
- Genus: Emarginula
- Species: E. maculata

Binomial name
- Emarginula maculata Adams, 1863

= Emarginula maculata =

Species of gastropod

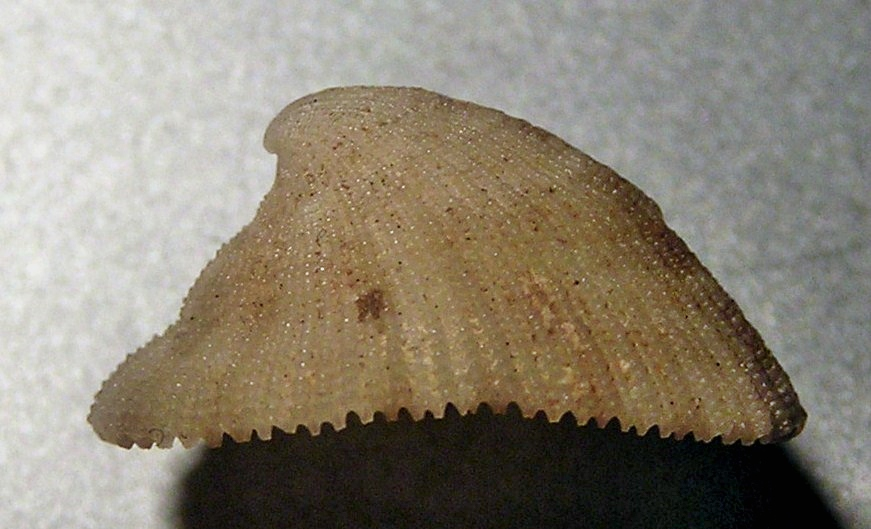
Lateral view of a shell of Emarginula maculata

Emarginula maculata is a species of sea snail, a marine gastropod mollusk in the family Fissurellidae, the keyhole limpets and slit limpets.
