= Emarginula camilla =

Scientific classification
- Kingdom: Animalia
- Phylum: Mollusca
- Class: Gastropoda
- Subclass: Vetigastropoda
- Order: Lepetellida
- Family: Fissurellidae
- Subfamily: Emarginulinae
- Genus: Emarginula
- Species: E. camilla

Binomial name
- Emarginula camilla Melvill & Standen, 1903

Species of gastropod

Emarginula camilla is a species of sea snail, a marine gastropod mollusk in the family Fissurellidae, the keyhole limpets and slit limpets.
