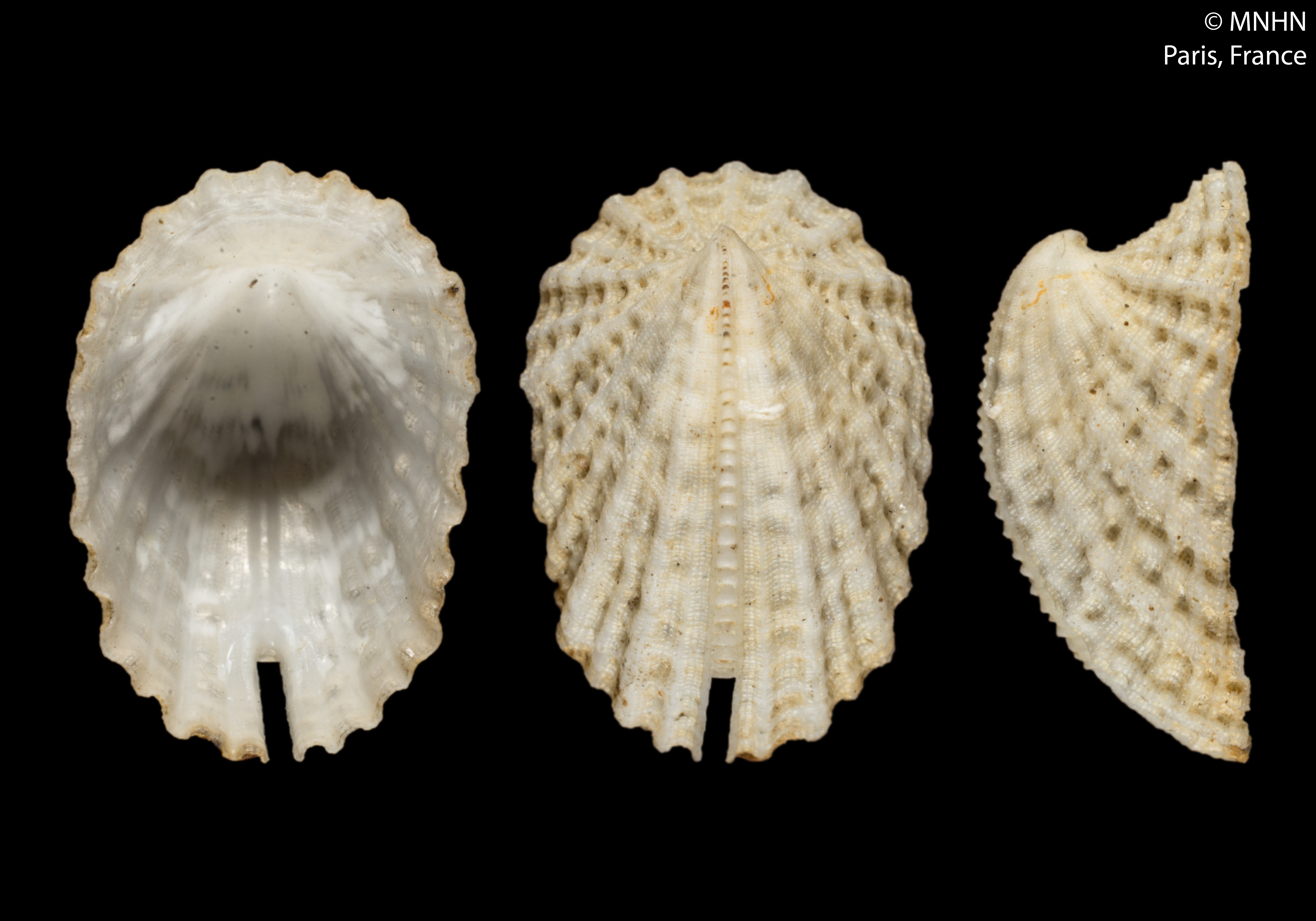
- Shell of Emarginula bicancellata (specimen at MNHN, Paris)

Scientific classification
- Kingdom: Animalia
- Phylum: Mollusca
- Class: Gastropoda
- Subclass: Vetigastropoda
- Order: Lepetellida
- Family: Fissurellidae
- Subfamily: Emarginulinae
- Genus: Emarginula
- Species: E. bicancellata

Binomial name
- Emarginula bicancellata Montrouzier, 1860

= Emarginula bicancellata =

Species of gastropod

Emarginula bicancellata is a species of sea snail, a marine gastropod mollusk in the family Fissurellidae, the keyhole limpets and slit limpets.

== Distribution ==
This marine species occurs off New Caledonia.
