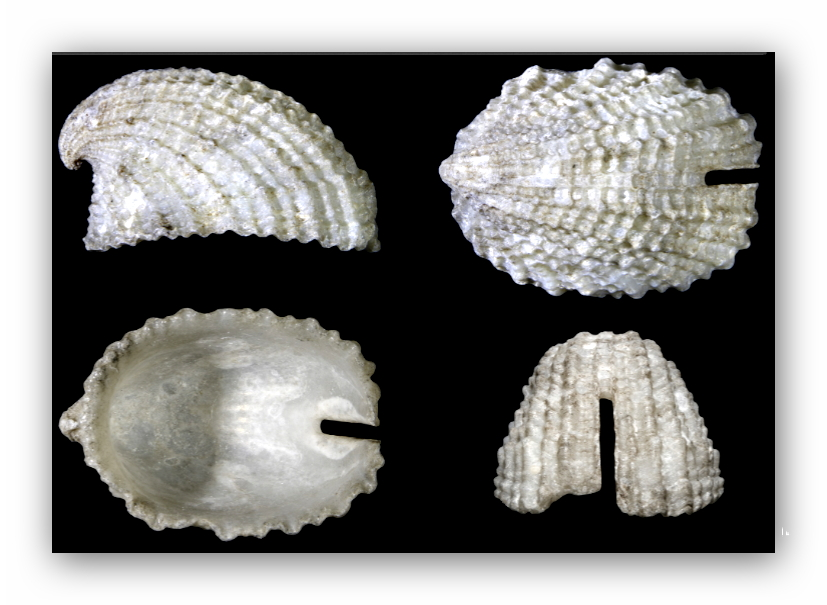
- Shell of Emarginula salebrosa (holotype)

Scientific classification
- Kingdom: Animalia
- Phylum: Mollusca
- Class: Gastropoda
- Subclass: Vetigastropoda
- Order: Lepetellida
- Family: Fissurellidae
- Subfamily: Emarginulinae
- Genus: Emarginula
- Species: E. salebrosa

Binomial name
- Emarginula salebrosa D. G. Herbert, 2024

= Emarginula salebrosa =

Species of gastropod

Emarginula salebrosa is a species of sea snail, a marine gastropod mollusk in the family Fissurellidae, the keyhole limpets and slit limpets.

== Description ==
(Original description)

- Dimensions: Holotype, base 7.0 × 5.4 mm, height 4.4 mm; largest specimen, base 8.4 × 6.0 mm, height 4.7 mm.
- Shell Characteristics
  - Size & Thickness: Small, with a basal length up to 8.4 mm, and notably thick.
  - Shape & Profile:
    - Apex: Strongly recurved, extending slightly beyond the posterior margin of the base in some specimens, though not reaching it in others.
    - Dorsal Profile: Strongly convex.
    - Basal Outline: Broadly ovate, with a length-to-width ratio (L/W) of 1.3–1.4, appearing flat or slightly concave in side view.
    - Height: Moderate, with a height-to-length ratio (H/L) between 0.56 and 0.63.
    - Slope & Face:
      - Anterior Slope: Humped in side view; anterior face slightly flattened on either side of the slit.
      - Posterior Slope: Almost straight and steeply inclined in larger specimens, less so in smaller ones.
- Protoconch: Generally tucked beneath the apex but often missing; somewhat eroded in available specimens, typically emarginuliform with traces of irregular granulation and a diameter of about 140 μm.
- Sculpture & Texture:
  - Anterior Slit: Narrow and moderately deep, extending roughly one-third down the anterior slope.
  - Selenizone: Initially forms a low mid-line rib with coarse lunulae, diminishing in prominence with growth and becoming weaker than neighboring primary ribs.
  - Radial Sculpture: Coarsely cancellate, with 14–16 primary radial ribs, narrower secondary ribs between them, and occasional tertiary ribs near the basal margin.
  - Concentric Ridges: Cross the radial ribs, equal in strength to secondary ribs, creating strong nodules at intersections.
  - Interstices: Rounded, quadrate depressions with single or paired intritacalx pits.
  - Basal Margin: Coarsely crenulated by the ends of the radial ribs.
  - Interior: Features a broad, thickened ridge underlying the selenizone; the apex is visible from the interior.
- Coloration: Juvenile specimens are uniformly white, while larger shells tend to appear dirty white.

== Distribution ==
This marine species occurs on the Walters Shoals, a group of submerged mountains off the coast of Madagascar.
