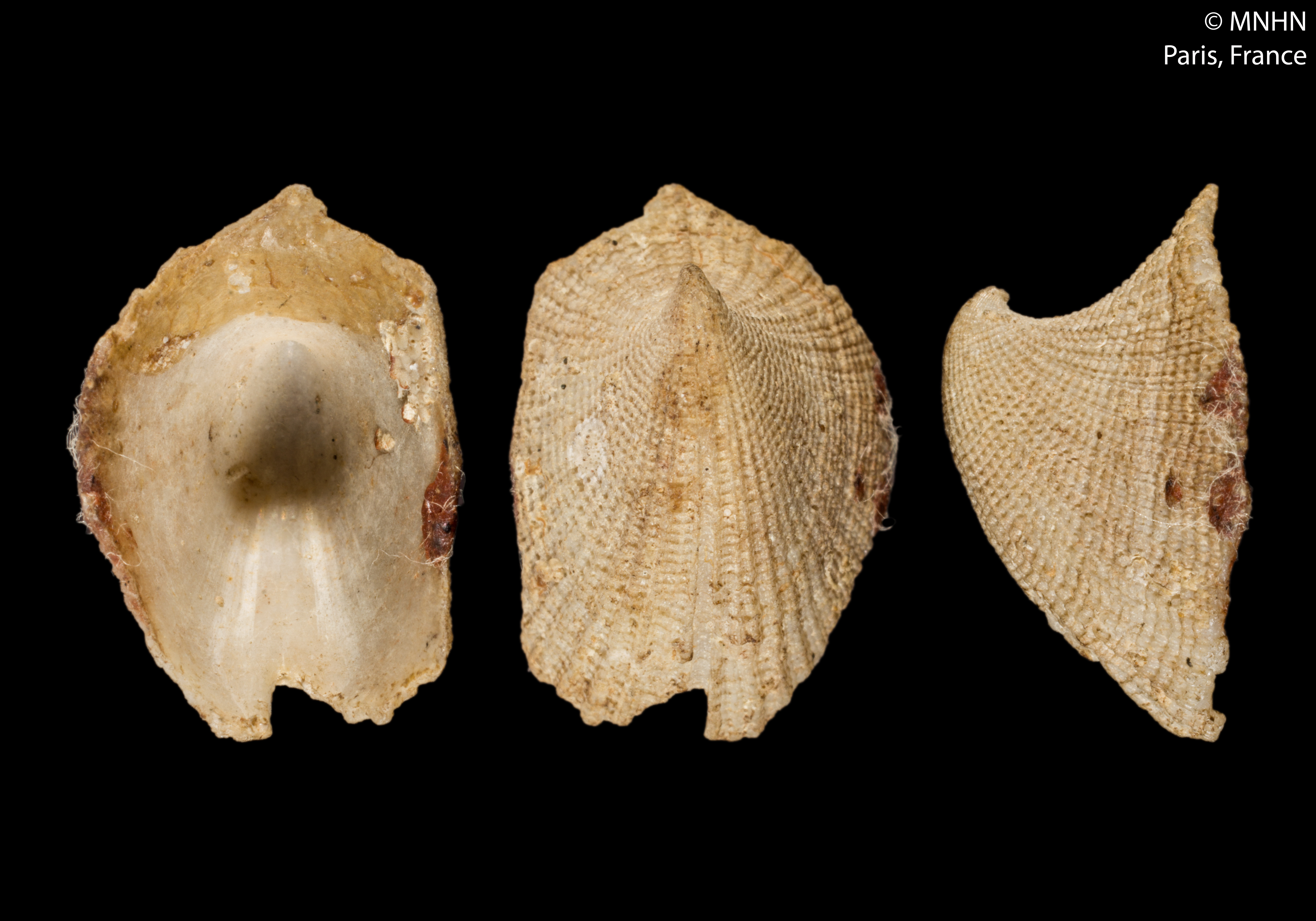
- Shell of Emarginula christiaensi (syntype at MNHN, Paris)

Scientific classification
- Kingdom: Animalia
- Phylum: Mollusca
- Class: Gastropoda
- Subclass: Vetigastropoda
- Order: Lepetellida
- Family: Fissurellidae
- Subfamily: Emarginulinae
- Genus: Emarginula
- Species: E. christiaensi

Binomial name
- Emarginula christiaensi Locard, 1898

Synonyms
- Emarginula elata Locard, 1898 (preoccupied by Emarginula elata Libassi, 1859)

= Emarginula christiaensi =

Species of gastropod

Emarginula christiaensi is a species of sea snail, a marine gastropod mollusk in the family Fissurellidae, the keyhole limpets and slit limpets.

== Description ==
This marine shell measures 15.4 mm.

== Distribution ==
This species occurs in the Atlantic Ocean off the Western Sahara.
