= Emarginula retecosa =

Scientific classification
- Kingdom: Animalia
- Phylum: Mollusca
- Class: Gastropoda
- Subclass: Vetigastropoda
- Order: Lepetellida
- Family: Fissurellidae
- Genus: Emarginula
- Species: E. retecosa

Binomial name
- Emarginula retecosa Adams, 1851

Species of mollusc

Emarginula retecosa is a species of sea snail, a marine gastropod mollusk in the family Fissurellidae, the keyhole limpets.
