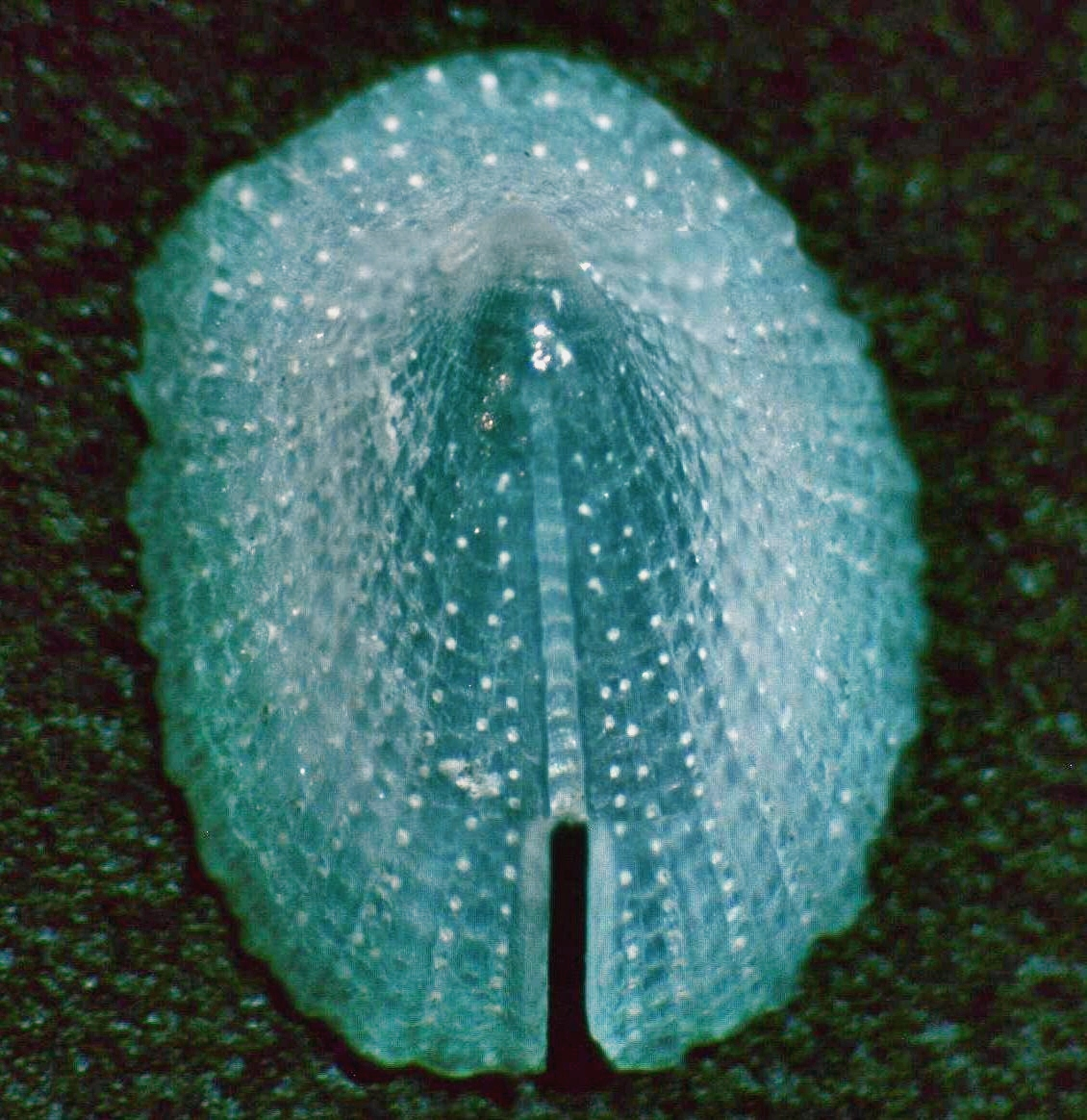
- Emarginula solidula

Scientific classification
- Kingdom: Animalia
- Phylum: Mollusca
- Class: Gastropoda
- Subclass: Vetigastropoda
- Order: Lepetellida
- Family: Fissurellidae
- Genus: Emarginula
- Species: E. solidula

Binomial name
- Emarginula solidula Costa, 1829

= Emarginula solidula =

Species of gastropod

Emarginula solidula is a species of sea snail, a marine gastropod mollusk in the family Fissurellidae, the keyhole limpets.

== Description ==
Emarginula solidula is a species of small marine gastropod mollusk that belongs to the family Fissurellidae. These snails are known as keyhole limpets due to the characteristic keyhole-shaped opening in their conical shells.

== Distribution ==
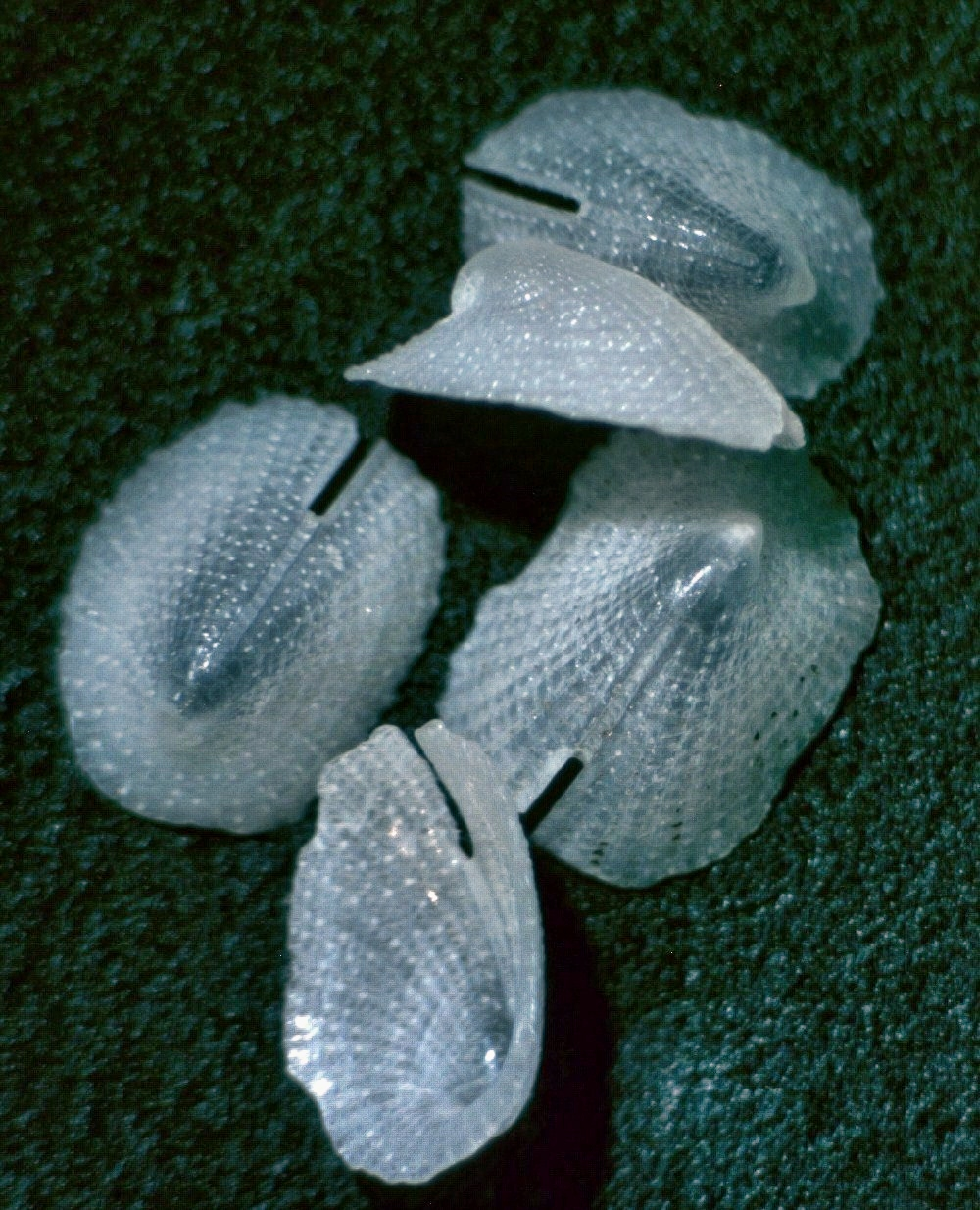
Emarginella solidula
