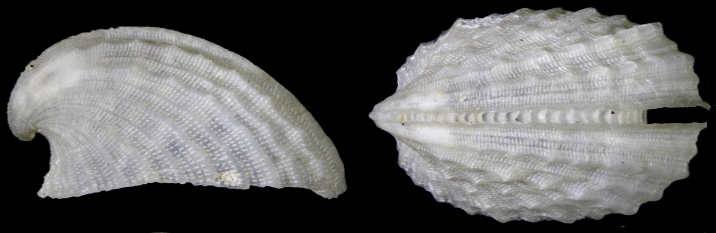
- Shell of Emarginula undulata

Scientific classification
- Kingdom: Animalia
- Phylum: Mollusca
- Class: Gastropoda
- Subclass: Vetigastropoda
- Order: Lepetellida
- Family: Fissurellidae
- Subfamily: Emarginulinae
- Genus: Emarginula
- Species: E. undulata

Binomial name
- Emarginula undulata Melvill & Standen, 1903

Synonyms
- Emarginula vadum Barnard, 1963

= Emarginula undulata =

Species of gastropod

Emarginula undulata is a species of sea snail, a marine gastropod mollusk in the family Fissurellidae, the keyhole limpets and slit limpets.

== Description ==
Dimensions: base 6.8 × 4.6 mm, height 3.8 mm.

== Distribution ==
This marine species is widely distributed along the continental margin of the western Indian Ocean, extending from the Gulf of Oman south to eastern South Africa, at depths ranging from 50 to 400 meters, with living specimens typically found between 75 and 120 meters. It was recently recorded in the Philippines (Poppe & Tagaro 2020) and has been found on the slopes of Walters Shoal (off Madagascar) at depths of 256–490 meters.
