= Emarginula pustula =

Scientific classification
- Kingdom: Animalia
- Phylum: Mollusca
- Class: Gastropoda
- Subclass: Vetigastropoda
- Order: Lepetellida
- Family: Fissurellidae
- Genus: Emarginula
- Species: E. pustula

Binomial name
- Emarginula pustula Thiele in Küster, 1913

Species of gastropod

Emarginula pustula is a species of sea snail, a marine gastropod mollusk in the family Fissurellidae, the keyhole limpets.
