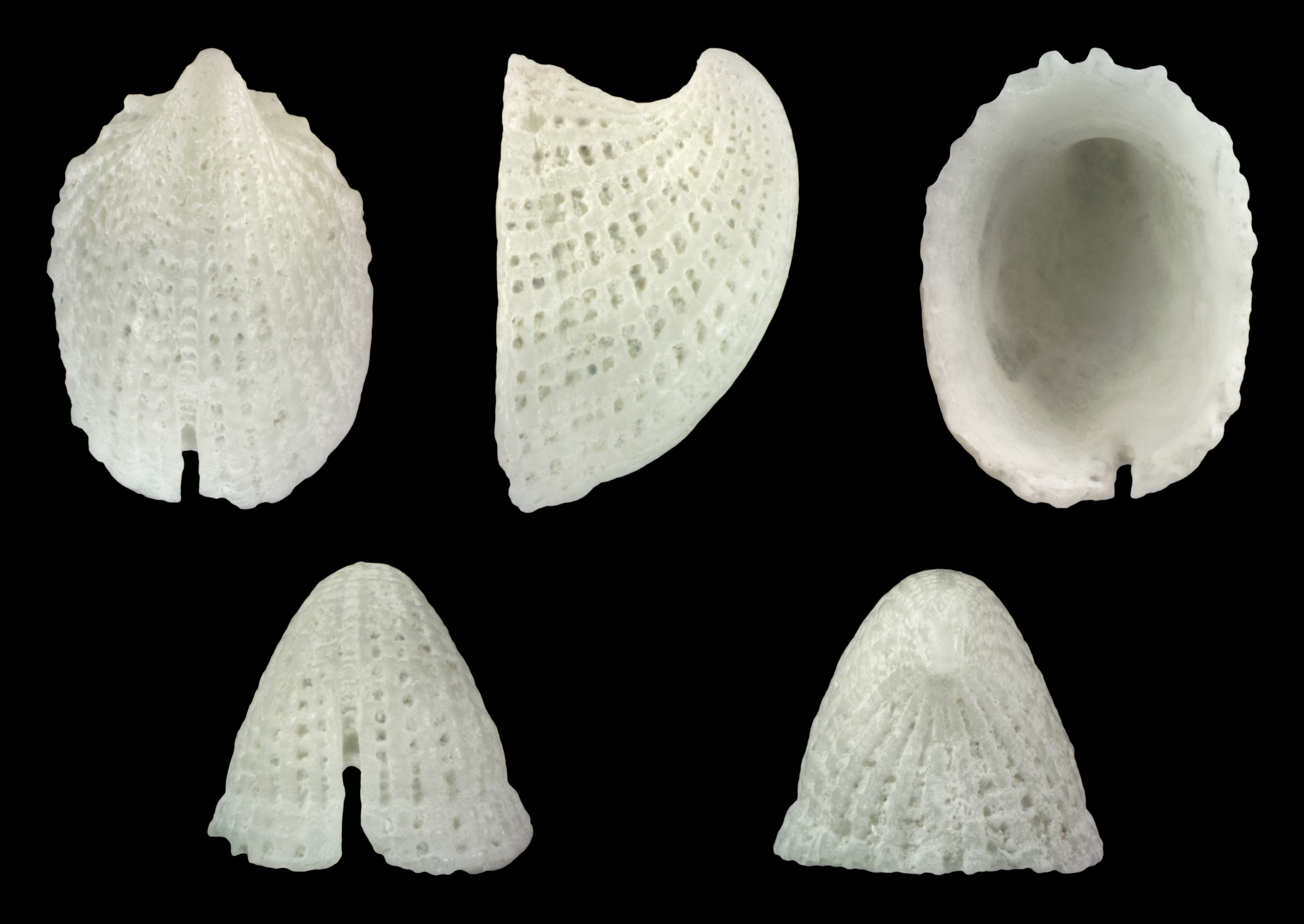

Scientific classification
- Kingdom: Animalia
- Phylum: Mollusca
- Class: Gastropoda
- Subclass: Vetigastropoda
- Order: Lepetellida
- Family: Fissurellidae
- Genus: Emarginula
- Species: E. rosea

Binomial name
- Emarginula rosea Bell, 1824

Synonyms
- Emarginula capuliformis Philippi, 1836; Emarginula costae Tiberi, 1855; Emarginula pileolus Michaud, 1829; Emarginula richardi Fenaux, 1942; † Emarginula rostrata Millet, 1865

= Emarginula rosea =

Species of gastropod

Emarginula rosea is a species of sea snail, a marine gastropod mollusk in the family Fissurellidae, the keyhole limpets.

== Description ==
The size of the shell attains 4.5 mm.

== Distribution ==
TYhis marine species occurs in the Eastern Atlantic, from the British Isles to Morocco, nearshore to ca. 200 m; in the Mediterranean, mostly 50–200 m.
