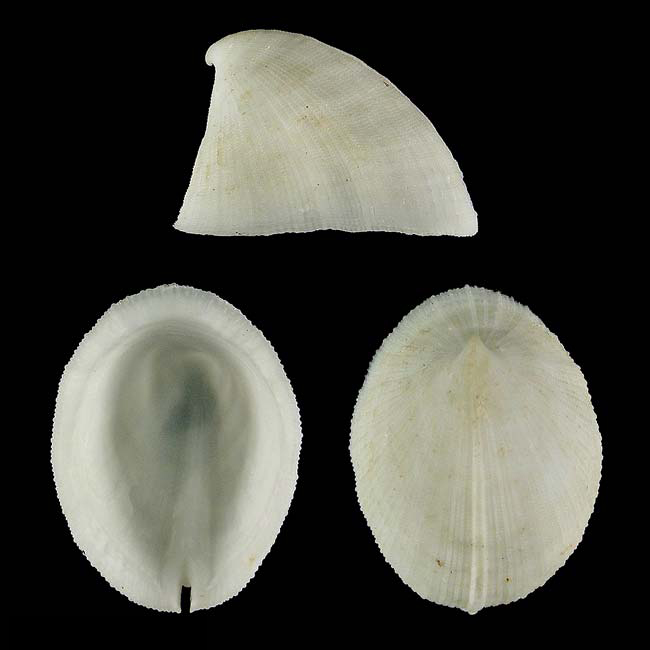
- Emarginula gigantea

Scientific classification
- Kingdom: Animalia
- Phylum: Mollusca
- Class: Gastropoda
- Subclass: Vetigastropoda
- Order: Lepetellida
- Family: Fissurellidae
- Genus: Emarginula
- Species: E. gigantea

Binomial name
- Emarginula gigantea Poppe, 2008

= Emarginula gigantea =

Species of gastropod

Emarginula gigantea is a species of sea snail, a marine gastropod mollusk in the family Fissurellidae, the keyhole limpets.
