= Emarginula tenuicostata =

Scientific classification
- Kingdom: Animalia
- Phylum: Mollusca
- Class: Gastropoda
- Subclass: Vetigastropoda
- Order: Lepetellida
- Family: Fissurellidae
- Genus: Emarginula
- Species: E. tenuicostata

Binomial name
- Emarginula tenuicostata Sowerby II, 1863

Species of gastropod

Emarginula tenuicostata is a species of sea snail, a marine gastropod mollusk in the family Fissurellidae, the keyhole limpets.
