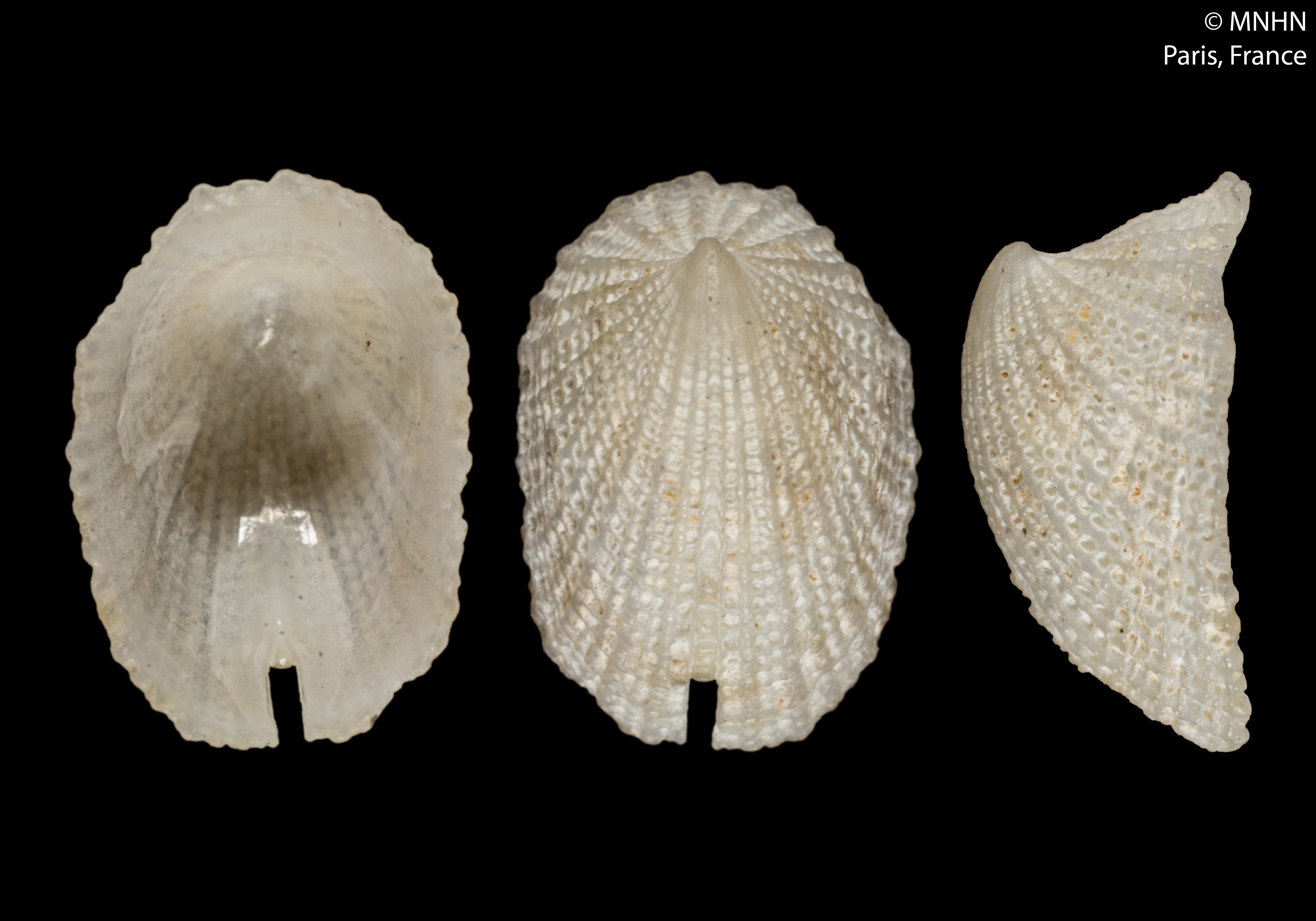
- Shell of Emarginula decorata (holotype at MNHN, Paris)

Scientific classification
- Kingdom: Animalia
- Phylum: Mollusca
- Class: Gastropoda
- Subclass: Vetigastropoda
- Order: Lepetellida
- Family: Fissurellidae
- Genus: Emarginula
- Species: E. decorata

Binomial name
- Emarginula decorata Deshayes, 1863

= Emarginula decorata =

Species of gastropod

Emarginula decorata is a species of small sea snail, a marine gastropod mollusk in the family Fissurellidae, commonly known as the keyhole limpets.

== Description ==
The size of the shell attains 8.5 mm.

== Distribution ==
The species occurs in the Indian Ocean off Réunion.
