= Emarginula convexa =

Scientific classification
- Kingdom: Animalia
- Phylum: Mollusca
- Class: Gastropoda
- Subclass: Vetigastropoda
- Order: Lepetellida
- Family: Fissurellidae
- Subfamily: Emarginulinae
- Genus: Emarginula
- Species: E. convexa

Binomial name
- Emarginula convexa Hedley, 1907

Synonyms
- Emarginula flindersi Cotton, 1930

Species of gastropod

Emarginula convexa is a species of sea snail, a marine gastropod mollusk in the family Fissurellidae, the keyhole limpets and slit limpets.
