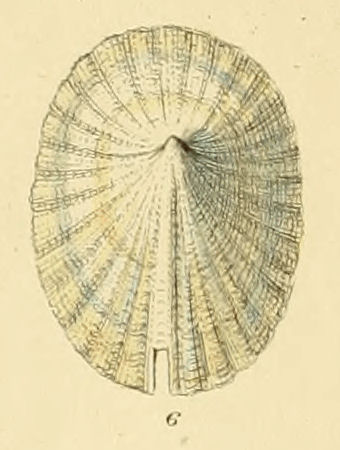

Scientific classification
- Kingdom: Animalia
- Phylum: Mollusca
- Class: Gastropoda
- Subclass: Vetigastropoda
- Order: Lepetellida
- Family: Fissurellidae
- Genus: Emarginula
- Species: E. crassa

Binomial name
- Emarginula crassa Sowerby I, 1812

= Emarginula crassa =

Species of gastropod

Emarginula crassa, the thick slit limpet, is a species of sea snail, a marine gastropod mollusk in the family Fissurellidae, the keyhole limpets.

== Description ==
The thick slit limpet is a large keyhole limpet with a length of 30 mm and about 15 mm high. The white shell is cap-like with a reticulate sculpture. The apex is curved backwards. The radial ribs number about 50 and are less pronounced than in other species of this genus. There is an exhalant slit in the anterior margin.

== Distribution ==
This species is found on hard surfaces, usually under stones, from low water levels to the sublittoral zone at depths up to 200 m. It occurs in European waters from Norway, Orkney and Shetland, south to the British Isles.

== Feeding habits ==
This limpet is deposit feeder and a grazer.
