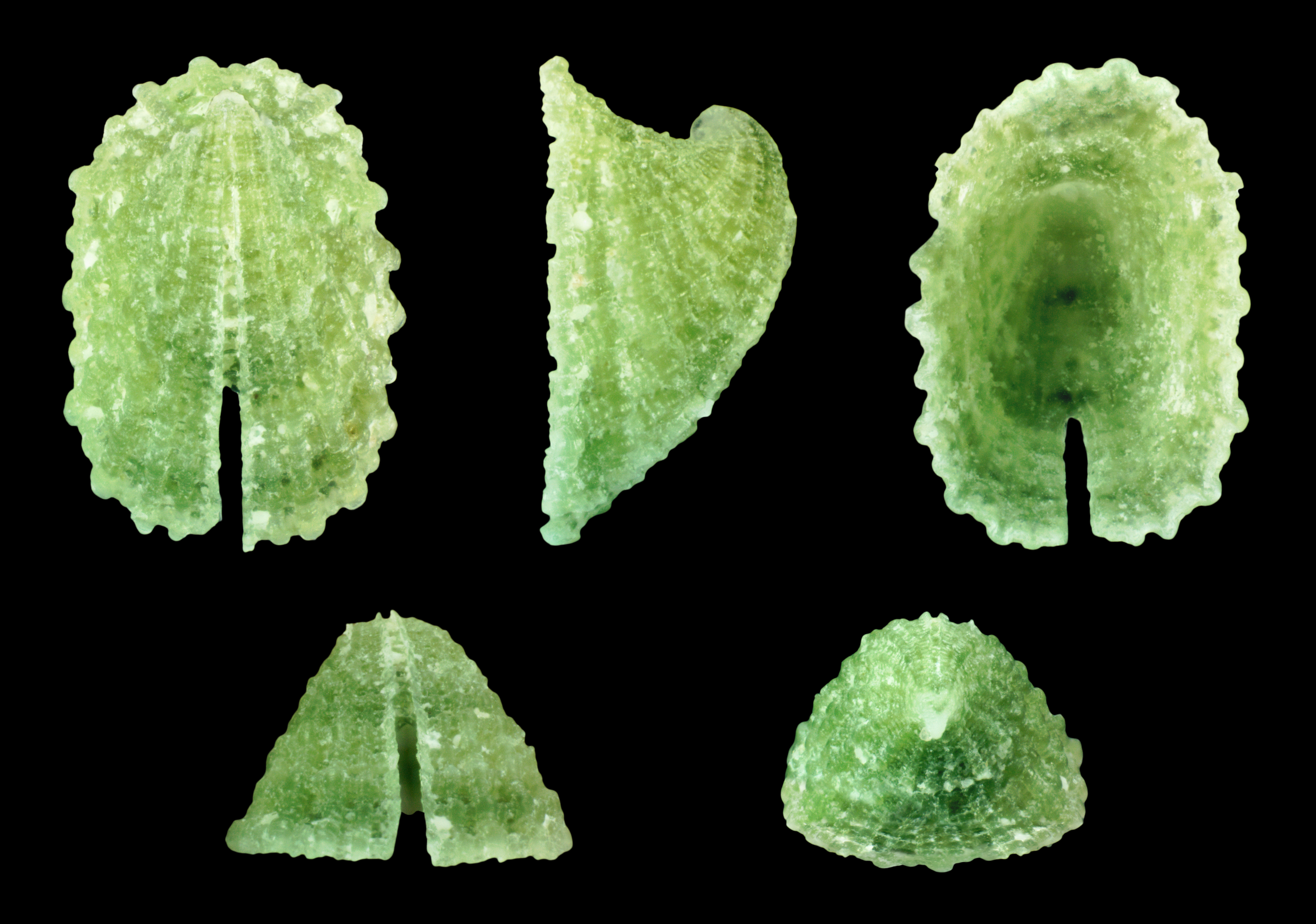

Scientific classification
- Kingdom: Animalia
- Phylum: Mollusca
- Class: Gastropoda
- Subclass: Vetigastropoda
- Order: Lepetellida
- Family: Fissurellidae
- Genus: Emarginula
- Species: E. costulata

Binomial name
- Emarginula costulata Deshayes, 1863

Synonyms
- Emarginula harmilensis Sturany, 1903

= Emarginula costulata =

Species of gastropod

Emarginula costulata is a species of sea snail, a marine gastropod mollusk in the family Fissurellidae, the keyhole limpets.

== Description ==
The length of the shell attains 5.5 mm.

== Distribution ==
This species is found throughout the south-western Indian Ocean, with confirmed sightings from Mauritius, Reunion and Mozambique and south to northern Zululand. This species has a depth range from shallow sub-tidal to 100m. Live individuals have been observed between 5-70m. One preserved individual was collected at Reunion Island, western Indian Ocean (Museum of Comparative Zoology, Harvard University).
