= Eupithecia concinna =

Scientific classification
- Kingdom: Animalia
- Phylum: Arthropoda
- Clade: Pancrustacea
- Class: Insecta
- Order: Lepidoptera
- Family: Geometridae
- Genus: Eupithecia
- Species: E. concinna

Binomial name
- Eupithecia concinna Vojnits, 1983

Synonyms
- Eupithecia albicentralis Inoue, 1987

Species of moth

Eupithecia concinna is a moth in the family Geometridae. It was first described by András Mátyás Vojnits in 1983. It is found in Nepal.

The wingspan is 20–25 mm (0.79–0.98 in) in males and 20–24 mm (0.79–0.94 in) in females.
