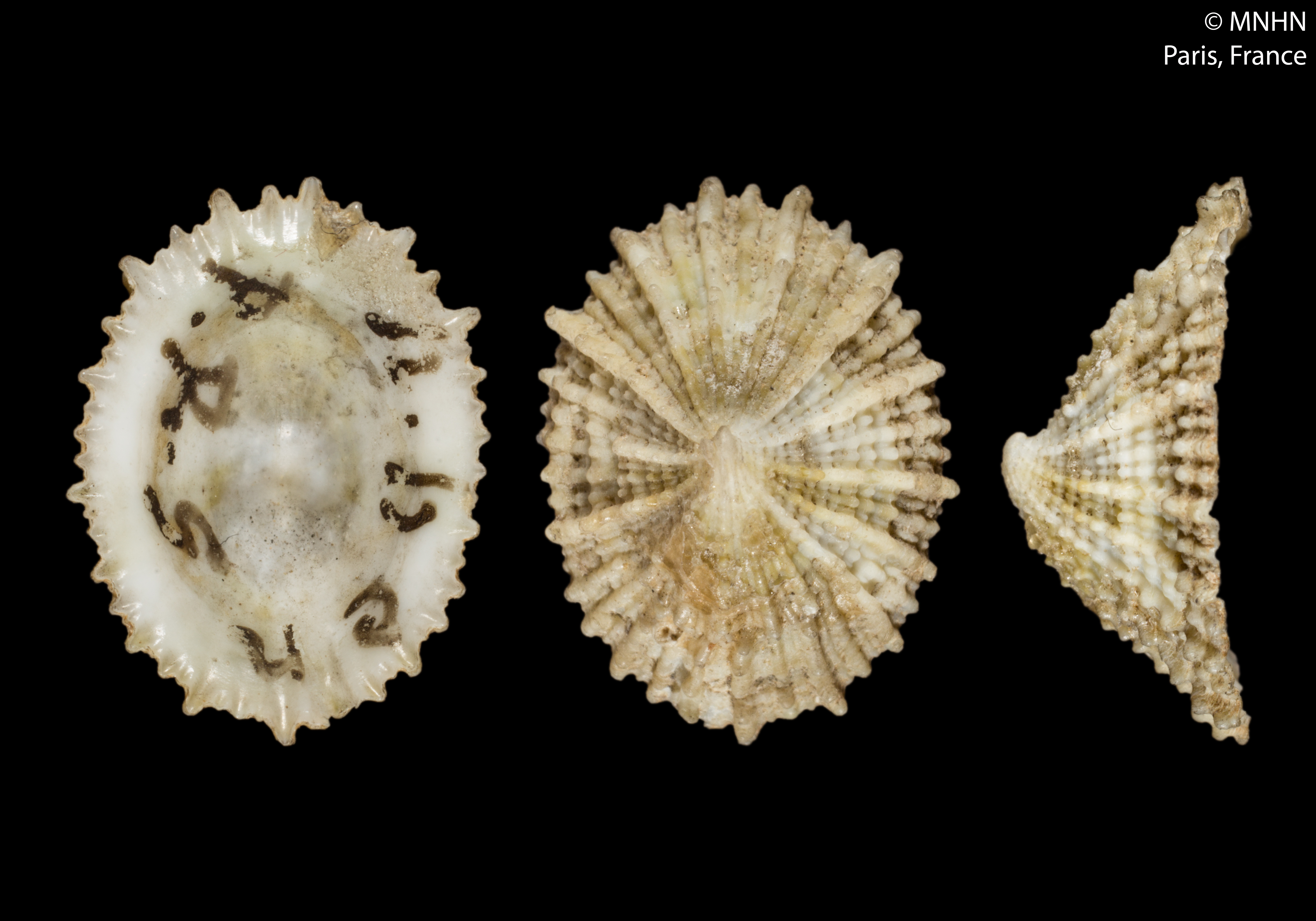
- Shell of Montfortula rugosa (syntype at MNHN, Paris)

Scientific classification
- Kingdom: Animalia
- Phylum: Mollusca
- Class: Gastropoda
- Subclass: Vetigastropoda
- Order: Lepetellida
- Family: Fissurellidae
- Genus: Montfortula
- Species: M. rugosa

Binomial name
- Montfortula rugosa (Quoy & Gaimard, 1834)

Synonyms
- Clypidina radiata (Gould, 1859); Clypidina rugosa (Quoy & Gaimard, 1834); Emarginula (Clypidina) radiata Gould, 1859; Emarginula aspera Gould, 1846; Emarginula cinerea Gould, 1846; Emarginula conoidea L. Reeve, 1842; Emarginula radiata Gould, 1859; Emarginula rugosa Quoy & Gaimard, 1834; Subemarginula rugosa Suter, 1913; Emarginula stellata A. Adams, 1852; Montfortula lyallensis Mestayer, 1928; Montfortula chathamensis Finlay, 1928; Montfortula conoidea Reeve, 1842; Subemarginula aspera (Gould, 1846)

= Montfortula rugosa =

Species of gastropod

Montfortula rugosa, common name the cap-shaped false limpet, is a species of keyhole limpet, a marine gastropod mollusc in the family Fissurellidae.

== Description ==
The size of the shell varies between 9 mm and 25 mm.

== Distribution ==
Montfortula rugosa, a marine species, is found off Australia (from West Australia to South Queensland), Tasmania, and New Zealand.
