= Variemarginula punctata =

Scientific classification
- Kingdom: Animalia
- Phylum: Mollusca
- Class: Gastropoda
- Subclass: Vetigastropoda
- Order: Lepetellida
- Family: Fissurellidae
- Subfamily: Hemitominae
- Genus: Variemarginula
- Species: V. punctata

Binomial name
- Variemarginula punctata (Adams, 1852)

Synonyms
- Emarginula altilis Gould, 1859; Emarginula pileata Gould, 1859; Emarginula punctata Adams, 1852

Species of gastropod

Variemarginula punctata is a species of sea snail, a marine gastropod mollusk in the family Fissurellidae, the keyhole limpets and slit limpets.
