= Nesta (gastropod) =

Scientific classification
- Kingdom: Animalia
- Phylum: Mollusca
- Class: Gastropoda
- Subclass: Vetigastropoda
- Order: Lepetellida
- Family: Fissurellidae
- Subfamily: Emarginulinae
- Genus: Nesta; Adams, 1870

Type species
- Nesta candida Adams, 1870

Genus of gastropods

Nesta is a genus of sea snails, marine gastropod mollusks in the family Fissurellidae, the keyhole limpets.

This genus has become a synonym for Zeidora A. Adams, 1860

== Species ==
Species within the genus Nesta include:

- Nesta amamiensis Habe, 1963

Species brought into synonymy

- Nesta atlantica Pérez Farfante, 1947: synonym of Laevinesta atlantica (Pérez Farfante, 1947)
- Nesta candida Adams, 1870: synonym of Zeidora candida (Adams, 1870)
- Nesta galapagensis McLean, 1970: synonym of Zeidora galapagensis (McLean, 1970)
