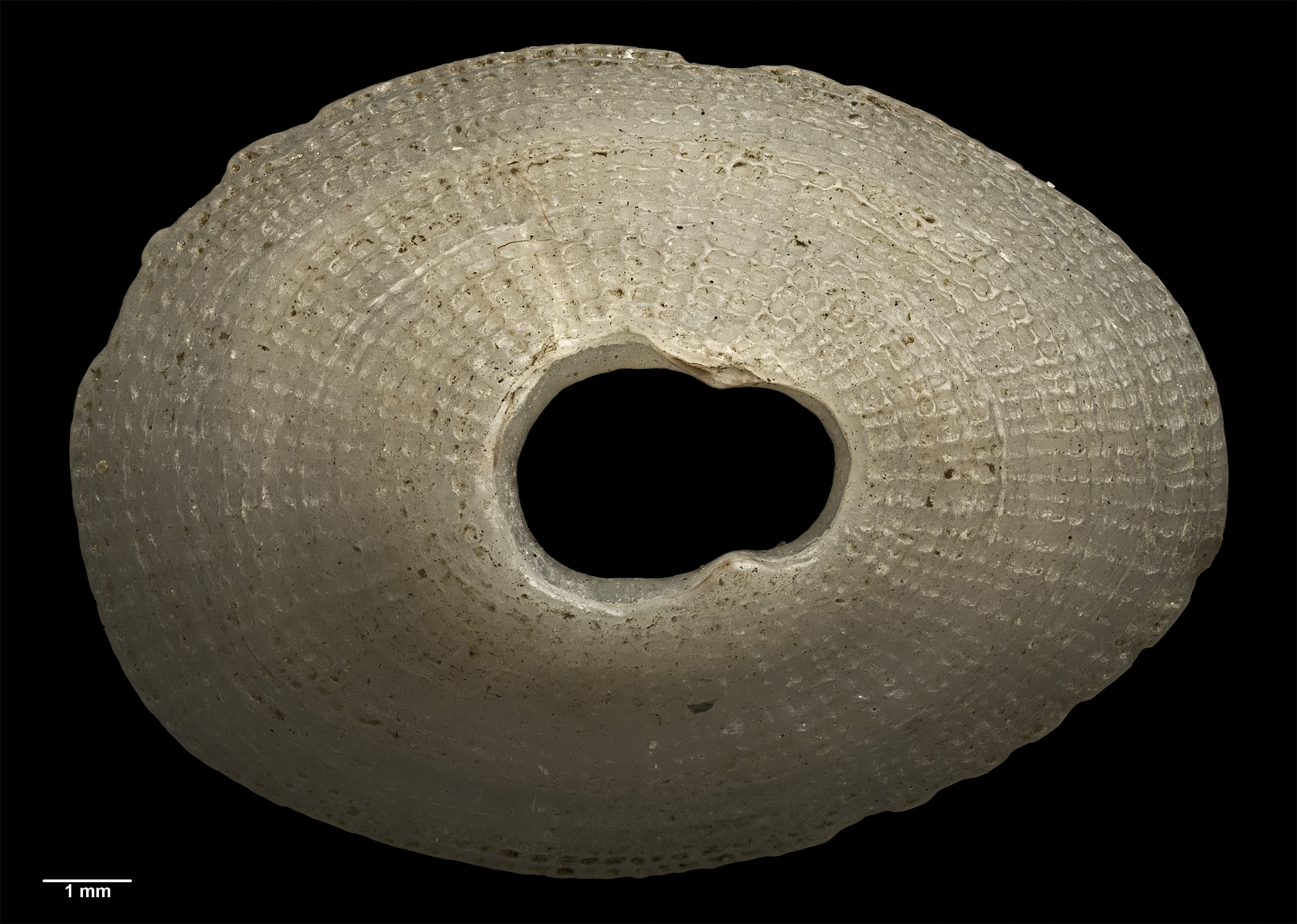

Scientific classification
- Kingdom: Animalia
- Phylum: Mollusca
- Class: Gastropoda
- Subclass: Vetigastropoda
- Order: Lepetellida
- Family: Fissurellidae
- Genus: Monodilepas
- Species: M. diemenensis

Binomial name
- Monodilepas diemenensis Finlay, 1930

= Monodilepas diemenensis =

Species of gastropod

Monodilepas diemenensis is species of small sea snail, a keyhole limpet, a marine gastropod mollusc in the family Fissurellidae, the keyhole limpets and slit limpets.

This species is found at North Island, New Zealand.

== Original description ==
Monodilepas diemenensis was originally discovered and described by Harold John Finlay in 1930. Finlay's original text (the type description) reads as follows:

Monodilepas diemenensis n. sp.

Similar to monilifera, but rather more solid. Sculpture is coarser, like otagoensis, shape a cross between monilifera and skinneri Finlay, not so high as the former, not so elongate and parallel-sided as the latter, which is from the Chatham Islands (Trans. N.Z. Inst., vol. 59, p. 236, Fig. 59, 1928). Distinguishable at sight from all the other species by the characters of the hinder margin and foramen; the hinder margin instead of being in the plane of the others is considerably raised off the ground, leaving a wide gape; the foramen is larger and more elongate than in monilifera, almost equalling skinneri in this feature, and especially has a quite different internal callus; this is hexagon-shaped instead of subtriangular, the posterior margin being strongly angled.

Length, 13.2 mm.; breadth, 9.5 mm.; height, 4 mm. (a slightly larger size than this is reached).

Locality—Cape Maria van Diemen, not uncommon cast up on the beach.

Type in Finlay collection.

There are apparently no previous records of the genus from the North Island.
