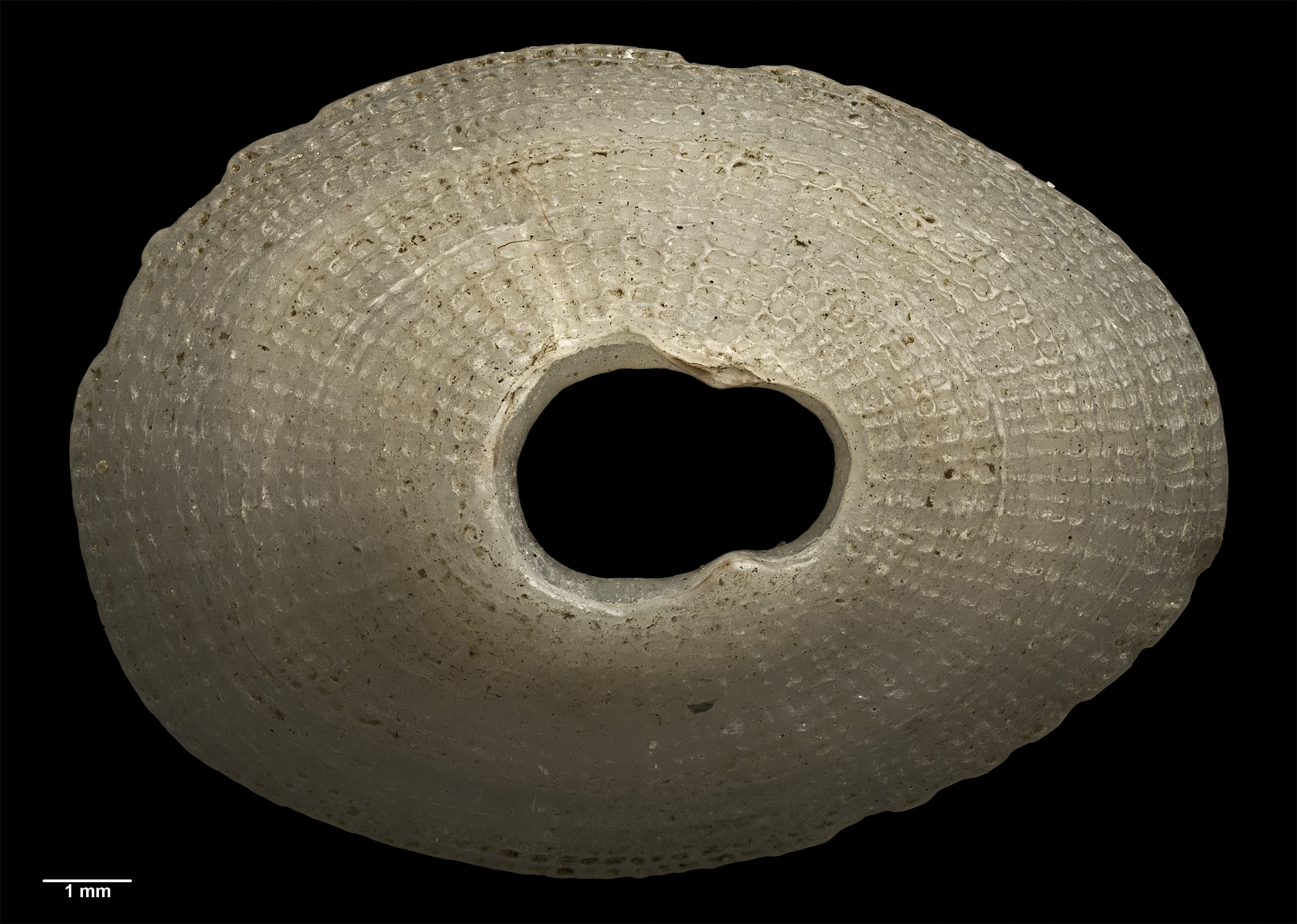
- Monodilepas diemenensis

Scientific classification
- Domain: Eukaryota
- Kingdom: Animalia
- Phylum: Mollusca
- Class: Gastropoda
- Subclass: Vetigastropoda
- Order: Lepetellida
- Superfamily: Fissurelloidea
- Family: Fissurellidae
- Subfamily: Diodorinae; Odhner, 1932

= Diodorinae =

Subfamily of limpet-like sea snails

The Diodorinae, common name keyhole limpets and slit limpets, is a taxonomic subfamily of limpet-like sea snails, marine gastropod molluscs in the family Fissurellidae, the keyhole limpets and slit limpets.

== Genera ==
- Cosmetalepas Iredale, 1924
- Diodora Gray, 1821
- Fissurellidea d'Orbigny, 1839
- Lucapina Gray in G. B. Sowerby I, 1835
- Megathura Pilsbry, 1890
- Monodilepas Finlay, 1926

Genera brought into synonymy

- Austroglyphis Cotton & Godfrey, 1934: synonym of Diodora Gray, 1821
- Capiluna Gray, 1857: synonym of Diodora Gray, 1821
- Elegidion Iredale, 1924: synonym of Diodora Gray, 1821
- Fissurellidaea: synonym of Fissurellidea d'Orbigny, 1839 (misspelling of genus)
- Fissuridea Swainson, 1840: synonym of Diodora Gray, 1821
- Foraminella G. B. Sowerby I, 1835: synonym of Lucapina Gray in G. B. Sowerby I, 1835 (Not available: introduced in synonymy; placed in synonymy of Lucapina by First Reviser's choice by Thiele, 1929)
- Glyphis Carpenter, 1857: synonym ofDiodora Gray, 1821 (invalid: junior homonym of Glyphis Agassiz, 1843)
- Megatebennus Pilsbry, 1890: synonym of Fissurellidea d'Orbigny, 1839
