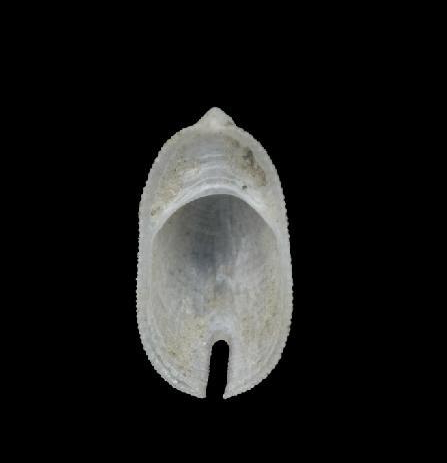
- Shell of Zeidora reticulata (specimen at Natural History Museum, London)

Scientific classification
- Kingdom: Animalia
- Phylum: Mollusca
- Class: Gastropoda
- Subclass: Vetigastropoda
- Order: Lepetellida
- Family: Fissurellidae
- Subfamily: Zeidorinae
- Genus: Zeidora
- Species: Z. reticulata

Binomial name
- Zeidora reticulata Adams, 1862

= Zeidora reticulata =

Species of gastropod

Zeidora reticulata is a species of sea snail, a marine gastropod mollusk in the family Fissurellidae, the keyhole limpets and slit limpets.

== Description ==
(Original description) This species differs from Zeidora calceolina in being much more convex, less obtuse anteriorly, and in the fissure being narrow and deeply incised. The sculpture, moreover, is very different, the surface being finely reticulate instead of widely cancellate.

== Distribution ==
This marine species occurs off Japan.
