= N. candida =

N. candida may refer to:

- Nesta candida, a sea snail species
- Nymphaea candida, an aquatic perennial herbaceous plant species native to quiet freshwater habitats in Eurasia

== See also ==
- Candida (disambiguation)
