= Zeidora gruelli =

Scientific classification
- Kingdom: Animalia
- Phylum: Mollusca
- Class: Gastropoda
- Subclass: Vetigastropoda
- Order: Lepetellida
- Family: Fissurellidae
- Subfamily: Zeidorinae
- Genus: Zeidora
- Species: †Z. gruelli

Binomial name
- †Zeidora gruelli R. Janssen, 1984

Species of gastropod

Zeidora gruelli is an extinct species of sea snail, a marine gastropod mollusk in the family Fissurellidae, the keyhole limpets and slit limpets.

== Distribution ==
Fossils of this marine species were found in Pliocene strata in Estepona, Spain.
