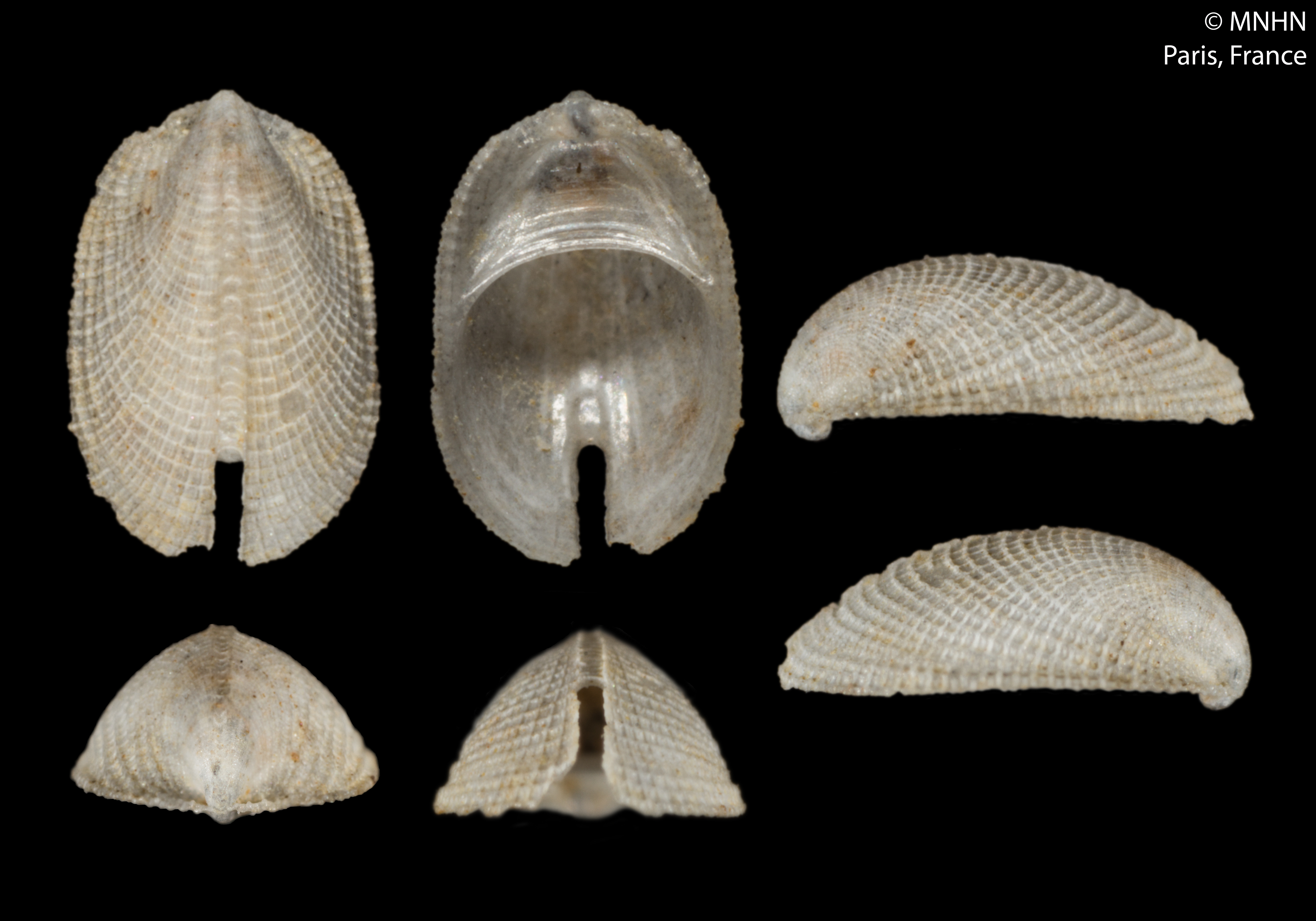
- Shell of Zeidora pussa (holotype at MNHN, Paris)

Scientific classification
- Kingdom: Animalia
- Phylum: Mollusca
- Class: Gastropoda
- Subclass: Vetigastropoda
- Order: Lepetellida
- Family: Fissurellidae
- Subfamily: Zeidorinae
- Genus: Zeidora
- Species: Z. pussa

Binomial name
- Zeidora pussa Simone & C. Cunha, 2014

= Zeidora pussa =

Species of gastropod

Zeidora pussa is a species of sea snail, a marine gastropod mollusk in the family Fissurellidae, the keyhole limpets and slit limpets.

== Description ==
The length of the shell attains 3.9 mm.

== Distribution ==
This marine species occurs in the Atlantic Ocean off Brazil.
