= Zeidora lodderae =

Scientific classification
- Kingdom: Animalia
- Phylum: Mollusca
- Class: Gastropoda
- Subclass: Vetigastropoda
- Order: Lepetellida
- Family: Fissurellidae
- Subfamily: Zeidorinae
- Genus: Zeidora
- Species: Z. lodderae

Binomial name
- Zeidora lodderae (Tate & May, 1900)

Synonyms
- Zidora lodderae Tate & May, 1900 (genus is an unjustified emendation)

Species of gastropod

Zeidora lodderae is a species of sea snail, a marine gastropod mollusk in the family Fissurellidae, the keyhole limpets and slit limpets.

== Description ==
The length of the shell attains 10 mm, its height 2.8 mm.

== Distribution ==
This marine species occurs off Tasmania, Australia.
