= Zeidora ligustica =

Scientific classification
- Kingdom: Animalia
- Phylum: Mollusca
- Class: Gastropoda
- Subclass: Vetigastropoda
- Order: Lepetellida
- Family: Fissurellidae
- Subfamily: Zeidorinae
- Genus: Zeidora
- Species: †Z. ligustica

Binomial name
- †Zeidora ligustica Bellardi, 1878

Synonyms
- † Crepiemarginula reticulata Seguenza, 1880 (invalid: secondary junior homonym of Zeidora reticulata A. Adams, 1862; Z. seguenzae is a replacement name); † Zeidora seguenzae R. B. Watson, 1883

Species of gastropod

Zeidora ligustica is an extinct species of sea snail, a marine gastropod mollusk in the family Fissurellidae, the keyhole limpets and slit limpets.

== Distribution ==
Fossils of this marine species were found in Pliocene strata in Estepona, Spain.
