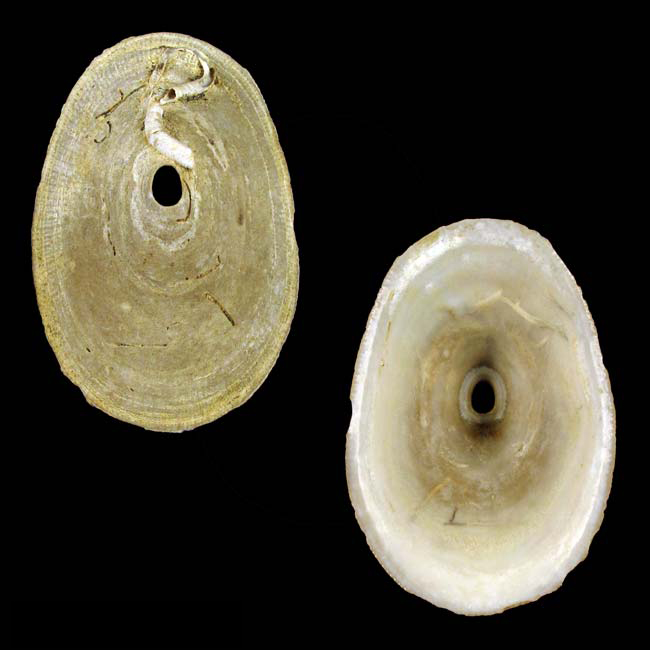

Scientific classification
- Kingdom: Animalia
- Phylum: Mollusca
- Class: Gastropoda
- Subclass: Vetigastropoda
- Order: Lepetellida
- Family: Fissurellidae
- Genus: Cosmetalepas
- Species: C. massieri

Binomial name
- Cosmetalepas massieri Poppe, Tagaro & Sarino, 2011

= Cosmetalepas massieri =

Species of sea snail

Cosmetalepas massieri is a species of sea snail, a marine gastropod mollusk in the family Fissurellidae.

== Description ==
The length of the shell attains 61 mm.

== Distribution ==
Cosmetalepas massieri can be found off of Namibia.

== Original description ==
- Poppe G.T., Tagaro S.P. & Sarino J.C. (2011) Two new species of Fissurellidae from Namibia. Visaya 3(4): 71-75. [November 2011]

page(s): 71.
