= Monodilepas monilifera cookiana =

Scientific classification
- Kingdom: Animalia
- Phylum: Mollusca
- Class: Gastropoda
- Subclass: Vetigastropoda
- Order: Lepetellida
- Family: Fissurellidae
- Genus: Monodilepas
- Species: M. monilifera
- Subspecies: M. m. cookiana

Trinomial name
- Monodilepas monilifera cookiana Dell, 1953

Subspecies of gastropod

Monodilepas monilifera cookiana is a subspecies of small sea snail, a keyhole limpet, a subspecies of marine gastropod mollusc in the family Fissurellidae, the keyhole limpets and slit limpets. This species is known to occur in Cook Strait, New Zealand.
