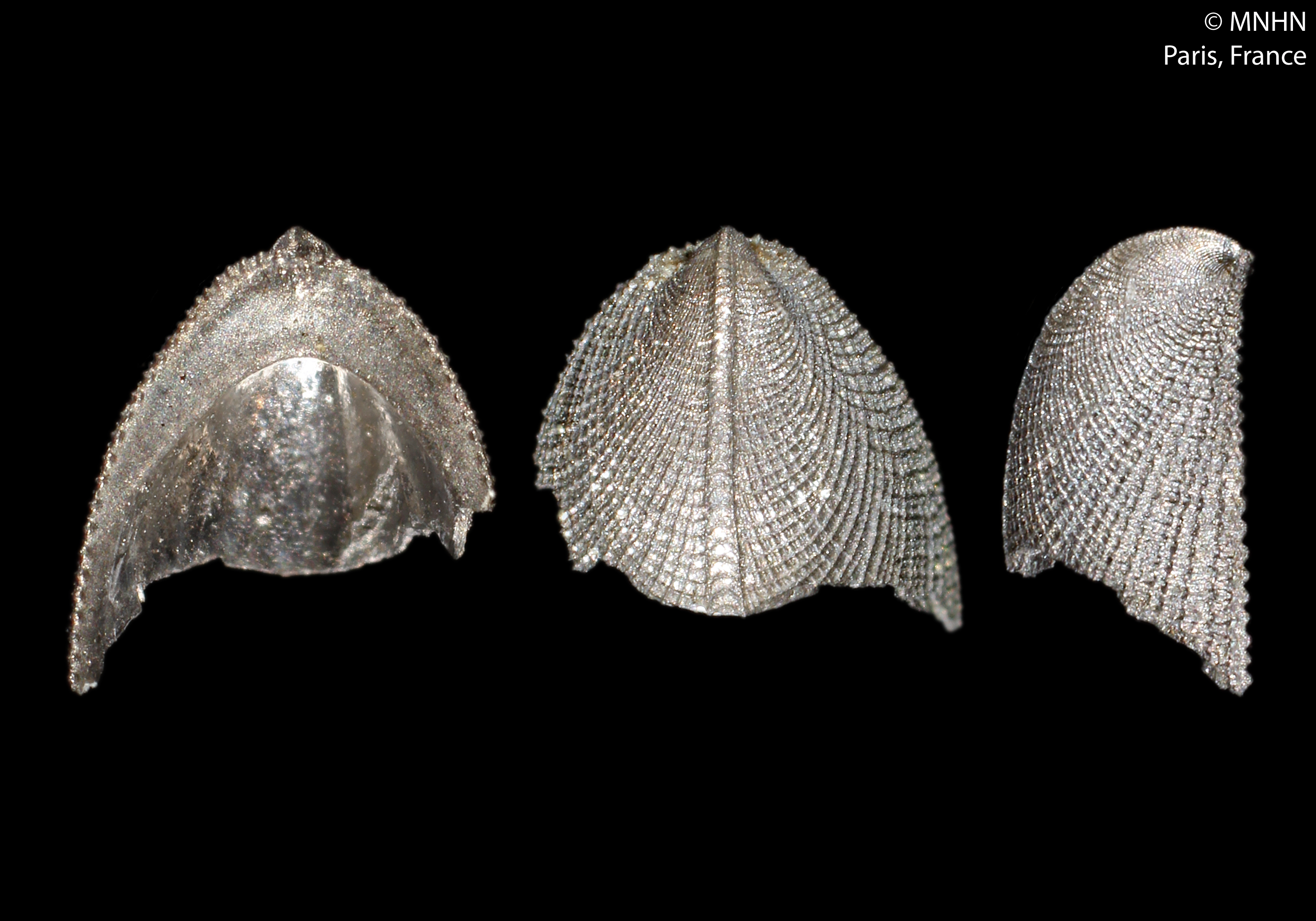
- Shell of Zeidora lacipidinae (holotype at MNHN, Paris)

Scientific classification
- Kingdom: Animalia
- Phylum: Mollusca
- Class: Gastropoda
- Subclass: Vetigastropoda
- Order: Lepetellida
- Family: Fissurellidae
- Subfamily: Zeidorinae
- Genus: Zeidora
- Species: †Z. lacipidinae

Binomial name
- †Zeidora lacipidinae Lozouet, 1999

= Zeidora lacipidinae =

Species of gastropod

Zeidora lacipidinae is an extinct species of sea snail, a marine gastropod mollusk in the family Fissurellidae, the keyhole limpets and slit limpets.

== Description ==
The length of the shell attains 2.6 mm.

== Distribution ==
Fossils of this marine species were found in the Landes, France.
