= Monodilepas monilifera carnleyensis =

Scientific classification
- Kingdom: Animalia
- Phylum: Mollusca
- Class: Gastropoda
- Subclass: Vetigastropoda
- Order: Lepetellida
- Family: Fissurellidae
- Genus: Monodilepas
- Species: M. monilifera
- Subspecies: M. m. carnleyensis

Trinomial name
- Monodilepas monilifera carnleyensis Powell, 1955

Subspecies of gastropod

Monodilepas monilifera carnleyensis is a subspecies of small sea snail, a keyhole limpet, a marine gastropod mollusc in the family Fissurellidae, the keyhole limpets and slit limpets. This species is found at the Auckland Islands, New Zealand.
