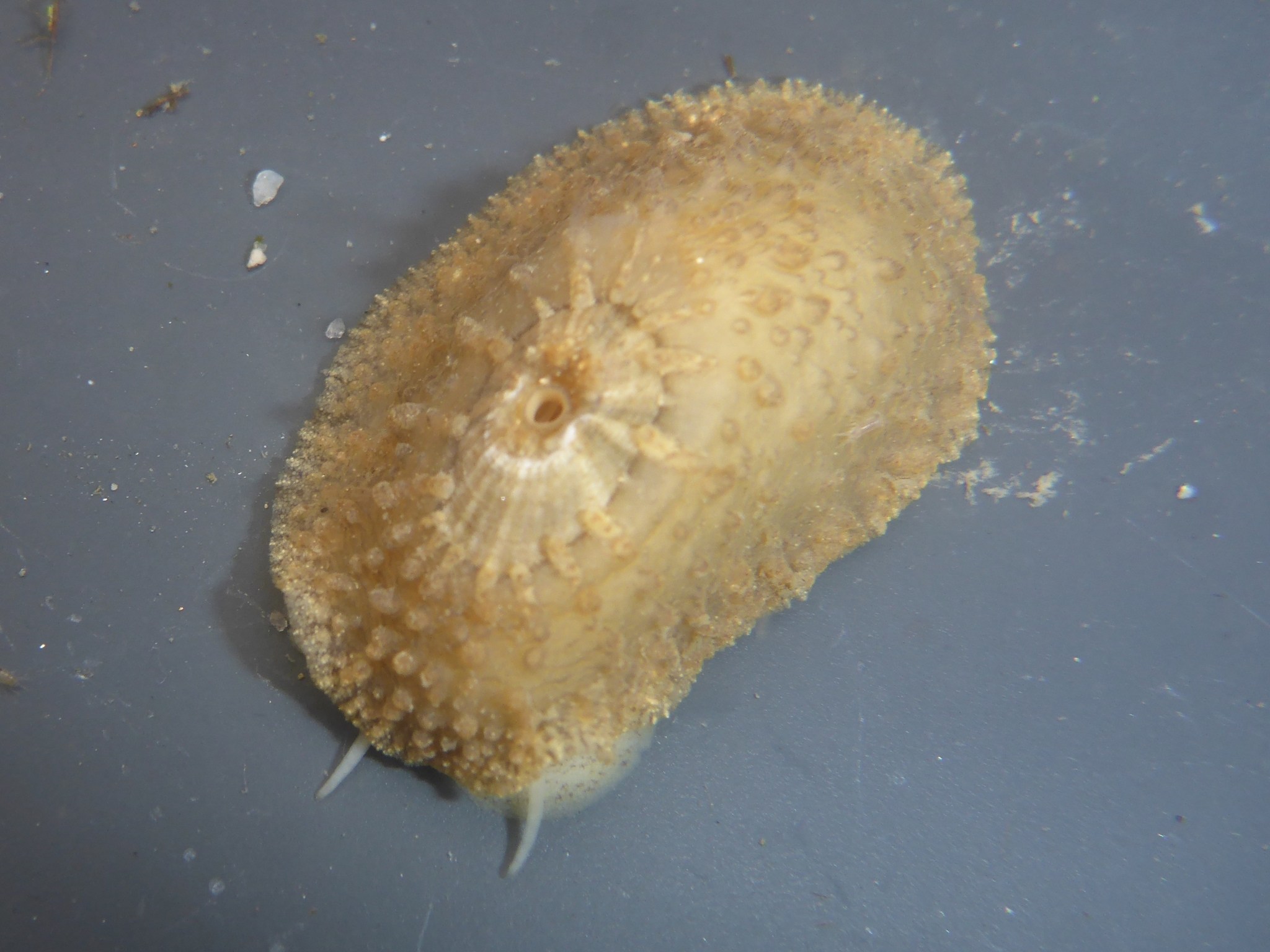

Scientific classification
- Kingdom: Animalia
- Phylum: Mollusca
- Class: Gastropoda
- Subclass: Vetigastropoda
- Order: Lepetellida
- Superfamily: Fissurelloidea
- Family: Fissurellidae
- Genus: Fissurellidea
- Species: F. bimaculata

Binomial name
- Fissurellidea bimaculata Dall, 1871

= Fissurellidea bimaculata =

Species of gastropod

Fissurellidea bimaculata is a species of sea snail, a marine gastropod mollusk in the family Fissurellidae, the keyhole limpets and slit limpets.
