= Zeidora macleani =

Scientific classification
- Kingdom: Animalia
- Phylum: Mollusca
- Class: Gastropoda
- Subclass: Vetigastropoda
- Order: Lepetellida
- Family: Fissurellidae
- Subfamily: Zeidorinae
- Genus: Zeidora
- Species: Z. macleani

Binomial name
- Zeidora macleani Gálvez & Torres, 2019

Species of gastropod

Zeidora macleani is a species of sea snail, a marine gastropod mollusk in the family Fissurellidae, the keyhole limpets and slit limpets.

== Distribution ==
This marine species occurs off Robinson Crusoe Island, Juan Fernandez Islands
