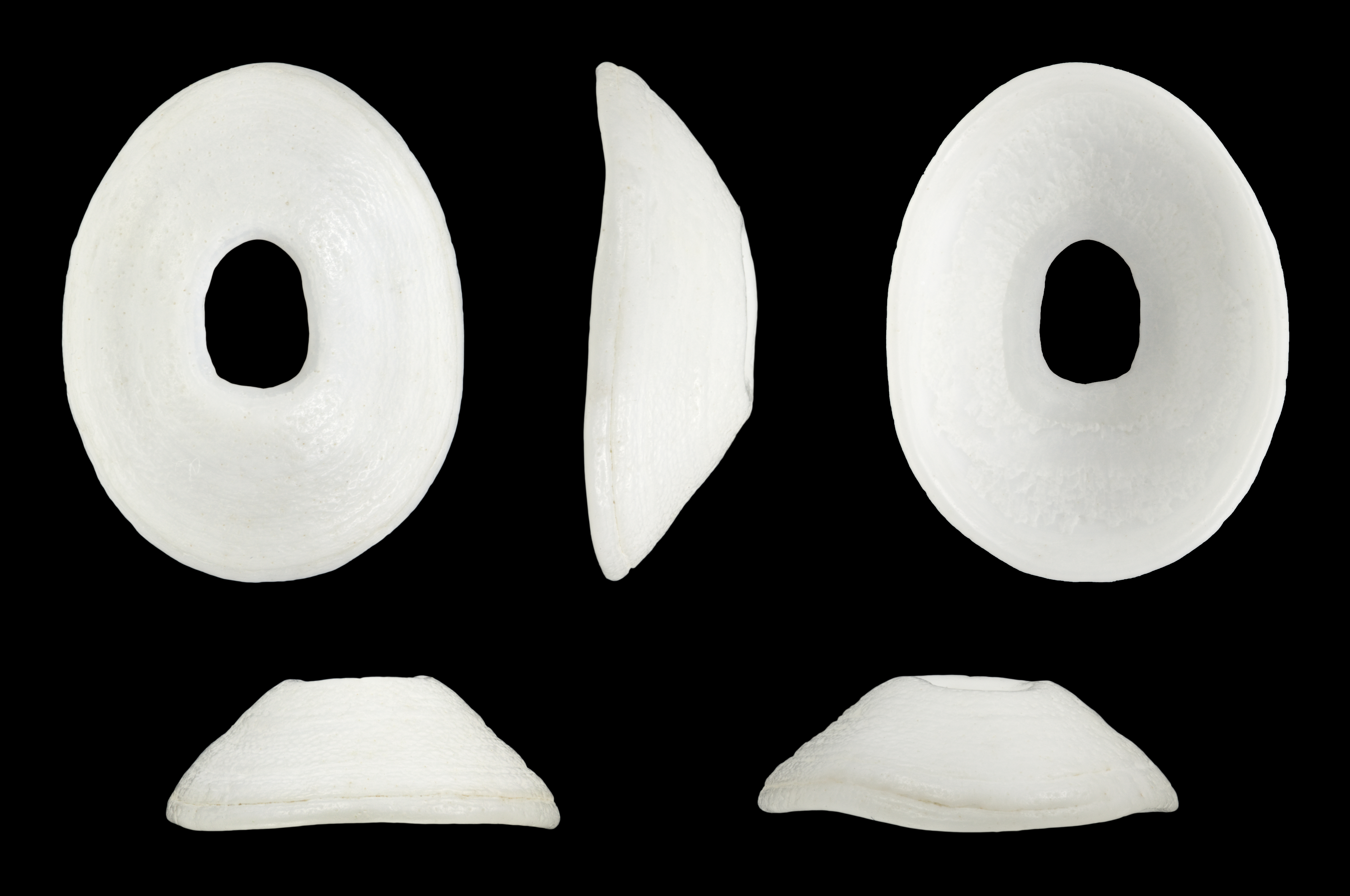
- A shell of Cosmetalepas africana

Scientific classification
- Kingdom: Animalia
- Phylum: Mollusca
- Class: Gastropoda
- Subclass: Vetigastropoda
- Order: Lepetellida
- Superfamily: Fissurelloidea
- Family: Fissurellidae
- Genus: Cosmetalepas
- Species: C. africana

Binomial name
- Cosmetalepas africana (Tomlin, 1926)

Synonyms
- Cosmetalepas africanus sic; Megatebennus africanus Tomlin, 1926

= Cosmetalepas africana =

Species of gastropod

Cosmetalepas africana is a species of sea snail, a marine gastropod mollusk in the family Fissurellidae, the keyhole limpets and slit limpets.

== Description ==
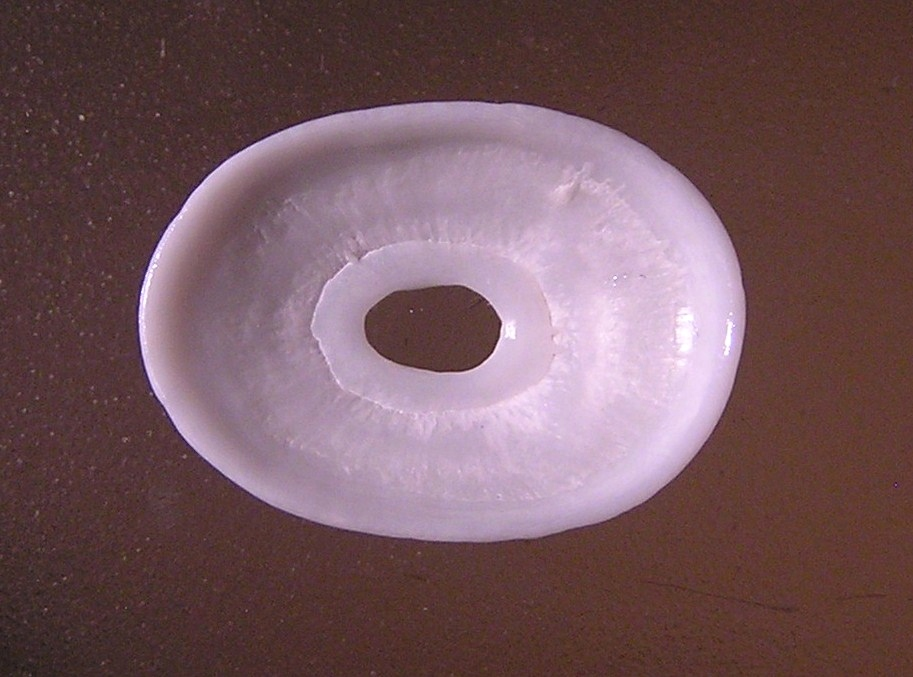
Ventral view of a shell of Cosmetalepas africana

The size of the shell varies between 14 mm and 50 mm.

== Distribution ==
This marine species occurs from Cape Agulhas to KwaZulu-Natal, South Africa.
