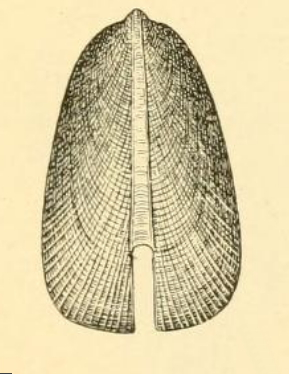
- Shell of Zeidora flabellum (holotype)

Scientific classification
- Kingdom: Animalia
- Phylum: Mollusca
- Class: Gastropoda
- Subclass: Vetigastropoda
- Order: Lepetellida
- Family: Fissurellidae
- Subfamily: Zeidorinae
- Genus: Zeidora
- Species: Z. flabellum

Binomial name
- Zeidora flabellum (Dall, 1896)

Synonyms
- Emarginella flabellum Dall, 1896 superseded combination

= Zeidora flabellum =

Species of gastropod

Zeidora flabellum is a species of sea snail, a marine gastropod mollusk in the family Fissurellidae, the keyhole limpets and slit limpets.

== Description ==
The length of the shell attains 12.5 mm, its height 3.25 mm.

(Original description) The small shell is translucent white, depressed, wider in front, narrow behind, squarish at both ends. The incurved apex terminal is behind. The slit is short, one-fourth as long as the shell, widest in front, straight. The fasciole is depressed, with an elevated keel on each side. The sculpture consists of fine concentric incremental lines and very fine elevated threads, which start from the anal fasciole and curve outward toward the margin with very few intercalated threads. The margin is smooth, the interior polished, the fasciole is convex inward. The front margin is twice as wide as the posterior margin.

== Distribution ==
This marine species was found off Clarion Island, Lower California, Mexico.
