= Zeidora milerai =

Scientific classification
- Kingdom: Animalia
- Phylum: Mollusca
- Class: Gastropoda
- Subclass: Vetigastropoda
- Order: Lepetellida
- Family: Fissurellidae
- Genus: Zeidora
- Species: Z. milerai

Binomial name
- Zeidora milerai Espinosa, Ortea & Fernandez-Garces, 2004

Species of gastropod

Zeidora milerai is a species of sea snail, a marine gastropod mollusk in the family Fissurellidae, the keyhole limpets.

== Description ==
The length of the shell attains 3.5 mm, its height 1.4 mm.

== Distribution ==
This species occurs in the Caribbean Sea off Cuba.
