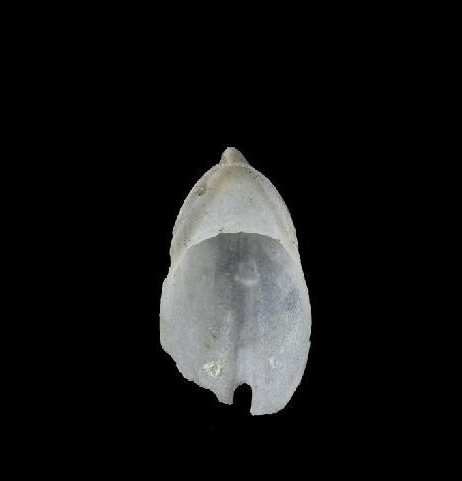
- Shell of Zeidora naufraga (specimen at Natural History Museum, London)

Scientific classification
- Kingdom: Animalia
- Phylum: Mollusca
- Class: Gastropoda
- Subclass: Vetigastropoda
- Order: Lepetellida
- Family: Fissurellidae
- Genus: Zeidora
- Species: Z. naufraga

Binomial name
- Zeidora naufraga Watson, 1883

= Zeidora naufraga =

Species of gastropod

Zeidora naufraga is a species of sea snail, a marine gastropod mollusk in the family Fissurellidae, the keyhole limpets.

== Description ==
The length of the shell attains 9.7 mm, its height 3 mm.

The white shell is delicate, depressed, oblong, pointed behind, with a minute short apex, rounded and cleft in front, with a broad flat keel bearing the old cleft-scar and extending the whole length of the shell. The enormous aperture is closed behind by a crepidula-like partition.

Sculpture: Longitudinals, from the apex to the cleft across the middle of the back runs a broad raised keel, flat on the top, where it is scored by the minute, delicate, sharp, prominent, close-set, but not contiguous scars of the old cleft. On either side it is bordered by a sharp marginal line: from these marginal lines branch off feeble irregular diverging threadlets between which, as they go wider apart, others arise. The intervals between them are two to three times the breadth of the threadlets. Spirals, strictly speaking, there are none, but the whole surface is scored at right angles to the longitudinals with a series of threadlets, very similar in form, but rather more closely set. These radiate from the apex and indicate the old mouth edges.

The color is porcellanous-white, which is dead on the threadlets but almost translucent elsewhere from the extreme thinness of the shell.

Apex: at the posterior end of the shell there is a narrow, rounded, prominent beak, within which, a little bent to the right and projecting slightly above the margin of the aperture, is the minute apex of one whorl.

The aperture is oblong. The margin is minutely denticulated by the ends of the ribs. The cleft in front by a strong, parallel-sided, blunt-ended fissure. Behind, it is peculiarly patulous, being markedly bent outwards from the line of attachment of the septum, this bending being strongly shown on the outside of the shell. Inside it is smooth. A strong depression corresponds to the exterior keel extends from end to end of the shell.

Septum: A little way within the margin, and deepest at the end, is the short oblique septum, which is faintly arched, with a concave edge in front.

== Distribution ==
This marine species was found north of Culebra Island, Puerto Rico.
