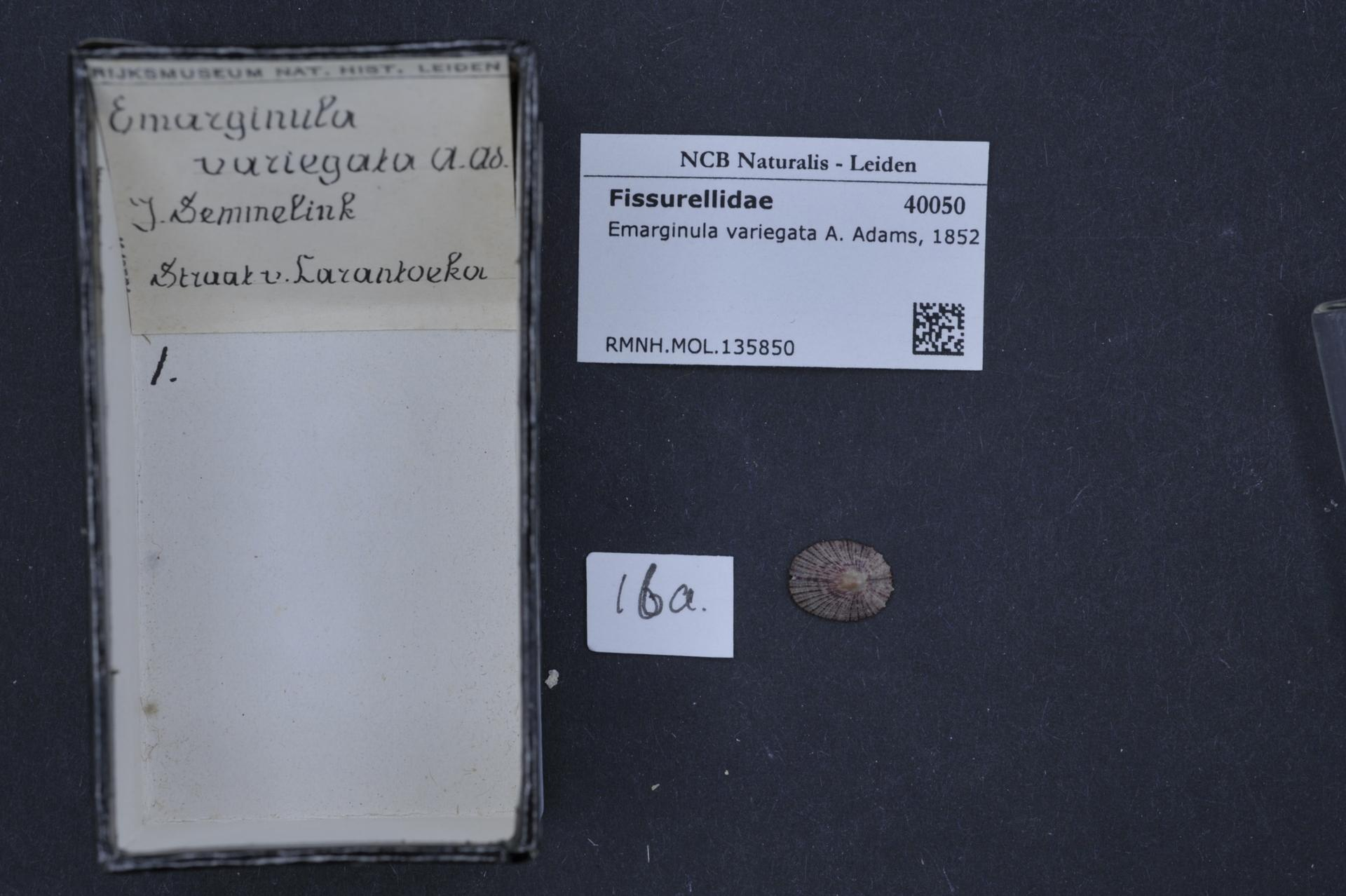

Scientific classification
- Kingdom: Animalia
- Phylum: Mollusca
- Class: Gastropoda
- Subclass: Vetigastropoda
- Order: Lepetellida
- Family: Fissurellidae
- Subfamily: Hemitominae
- Genus: Variemarginula
- Species: V. variegata

Binomial name
- Variemarginula variegata (Adams, 1852)

Synonyms
- Emarginula fuliginea Kuroda, 1941; Emarginula variegata Adams, 1852

= Variemarginula variegata =

Species of gastropod

Variemarginula variegata is a species of sea snail, a marine gastropod mollusk in the family Fissurellidae, the keyhole limpets and slit limpets.
