= Leurolepas roseola =

Scientific classification
- Kingdom: Animalia
- Phylum: Mollusca
- Class: Gastropoda
- Subclass: Vetigastropoda
- Order: Lepetellida
- Family: Fissurellidae
- Subfamily: Fissurellinae
- Genus: Leurolepas
- Species: L. roseola

Binomial name
- Leurolepas roseola McLean, 1970

Species of gastropod

Leurolepas roseola is a species of sea snail, a marine gastropod mollusk in the family Fissurellidae, the keyhole limpets and slit limpets.
