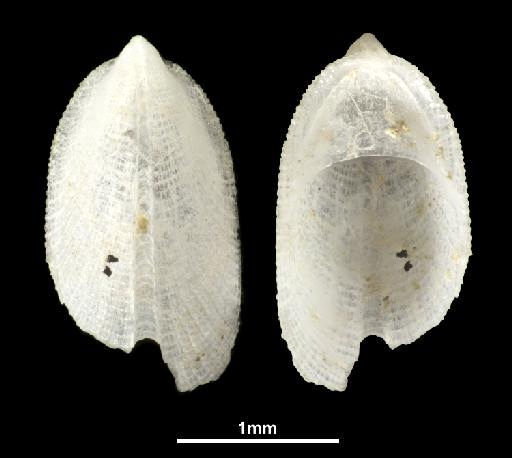
- Shell of Zeidora maoria (specimen at Natural History Museum, London)

Scientific classification
- Kingdom: Animalia
- Phylum: Mollusca
- Class: Gastropoda
- Subclass: Vetigastropoda
- Order: Lepetellida
- Family: Fissurellidae
- Subfamily: Zeidorinae
- Genus: Zeidora
- Species: Z. maoria

Binomial name
- Zeidora maoria Powell, 1937

= Zeidora maoria =

Species of gastropod

Zeidora maoria is a species of small sea snail, specifically a keyhole limpet, a marine gastropod mollusc in the family Fissurellidae, the keyhole limpets.

== Description ==
The length of the shell attains 3 mm, its height is 0.9 mm.

== Distribution ==
This marine species is endemic to New Zealand and occurs off Three Kings Islands.
