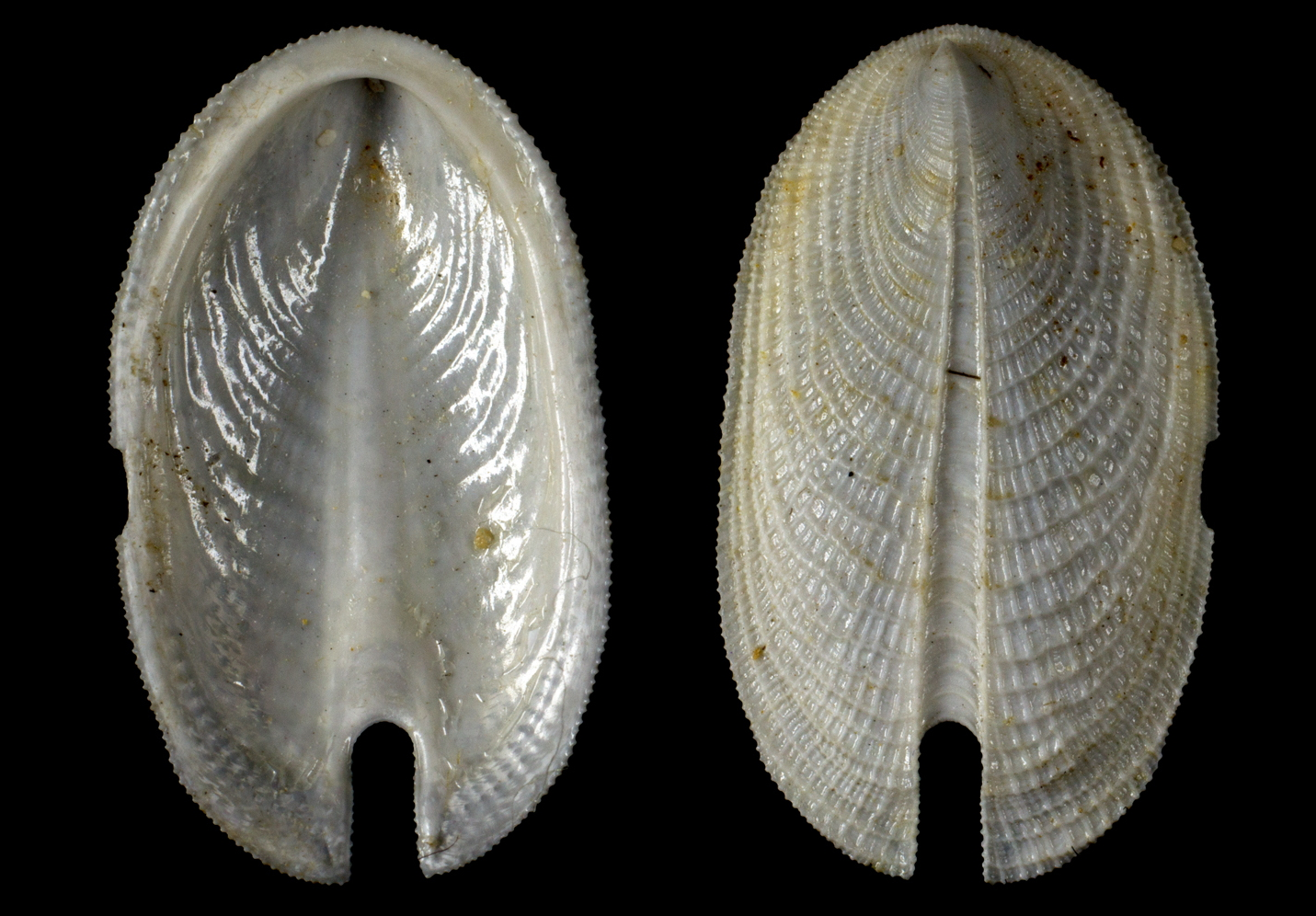
- Shell of Zeidora clypeata (specimen at MNHN, Paris)

Scientific classification
- Kingdom: Animalia
- Phylum: Mollusca
- Class: Gastropoda
- Subclass: Vetigastropoda
- Order: Lepetellida
- Family: Fissurellidae
- Subfamily: Zeidorinae
- Genus: Zeidora
- Species: †Z. clypeata

Binomial name
- †Zeidora clypeata (Lamarck, 1803)

Synonyms
- Emarginula (Entomella) clypeata Lamarck, 1803; Emarginula (Entomella) clypeata bourdoti Cossmann, 1885; Entomella (s. str.) cymbiola bourdoti (Cossmann, 1885); Entomella (s. str.) clypeata (Lamarck, 1803)

= Zeidora clypeata =

Species of gastropod

Zeidora clypeata is an extinct species of sea snail, a marine gastropod mollusk in the family Fissurellidae, the keyhole limpets and slit limpets.

== Distribution ==
Fossils of this marine species were found in Eocene strata in Picardy, France.
