= Fissurellidea patagonica =

Scientific classification
- Kingdom: Animalia
- Phylum: Mollusca
- Class: Gastropoda
- Subclass: Vetigastropoda
- Order: Lepetellida
- Superfamily: Fissurelloidea
- Family: Fissurellidae
- Genus: Fissurellidea
- Species: F. patagonica

Binomial name
- Fissurellidea patagonica (Strebel, 1907)

Synonyms
- Megatebennus patagonicus Strebel, 1907

Species of gastropod

Fissurellidea patagonica is a species of sea snail, a marine gastropod mollusk in the family Fissurellidae, the keyhole limpets and slit limpets.

== Description ==
The size of the shell reaches 22. 5 mm.

== Distribution ==
This species occurs in the Atlantic Ocean off Uruguay to Tierra del Fuego; off the Falklands
