= Zeidora geigeri =

Scientific classification
- Kingdom: Animalia
- Phylum: Mollusca
- Class: Gastropoda
- Subclass: Vetigastropoda
- Order: Lepetellida
- Family: Fissurellidae
- Subfamily: Zeidorinae
- Genus: Zeidora
- Species: †Z. geigeri

Binomial name
- †Zeidora geigeri Helwerda & Wesselingh, 2014

Species of gastropod

Zeidora geigeri is an extinct species of sea snail, a marine gastropod mollusk in the family Fissurellidae, the keyhole limpets and slit limpets.

== Distribution ==
Fossils of this marine species were found in Pleistocene strata in the Philippines.
