= Cosmetalepas concatenata =

Pitted keyhole limpet

Scientific classification
- Kingdom: Animalia
- Phylum: Mollusca
- Class: Gastropoda
- Subclass: Vetigastropoda
- Order: Lepetellida
- Superfamily: Fissurelloidea
- Family: Fissurellidae
- Genus: Cosmetalepas
- Species: C. concatenata

Binomial name
- Cosmetalepas concatenata (Crosse & P. Fischer, 1864)

Synonyms
- Fissurella concatenata Crosse & P. Fischer, 1864

Species of gastropod

Cosmetalepas concatenata, common name the pitted keyhole limpet, is a species of sea snail, a marine gastropod mollusk in the family Fissurellidae, the keyhole limpets and slit limpets.

== Description ==
The size of the shell varies between 10 mm and 22 mm.

== Distribution ==
This marine species occurs off New South Wales to Abrolhos Islands and off Tasmania.
