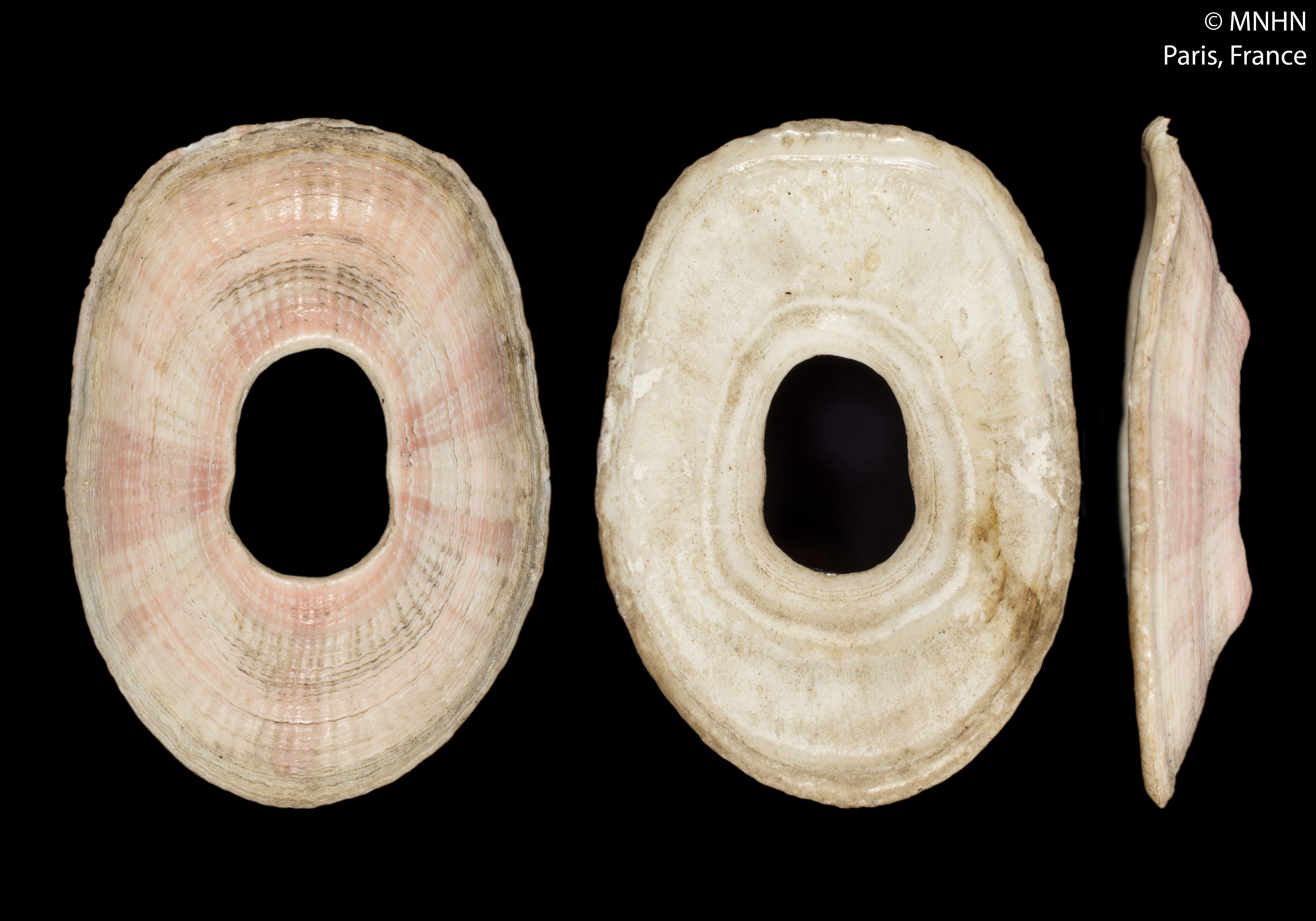
- Shell of Fissurellidea megatrema (syntype at MNHN, Paris)

Scientific classification
- Kingdom: Animalia
- Phylum: Mollusca
- Class: Gastropoda
- Subclass: Vetigastropoda
- Order: Lepetellida
- Superfamily: Fissurelloidea
- Family: Fissurellidae
- Genus: Fissurellidea
- Species: F. megatrema

Binomial name
- Fissurellidea megatrema d'Orbigny, 1839

Synonyms
- Fissurellidea hiantula auct. non Lamarck, 1822; Pupillaea aperta tehuelcha Ihering, 1907

= Fissurellidea megatrema =

Species of gastropod

Fissurellidea megatrema is a species of sea snail, a marine gastropod mollusk in the family Fissurellidae, the keyhole limpets and slit limpets.

== Description ==
The size of the shell varies between 17 mm and 32 mm.

== Distribution ==
This species occurs in the Atlantic Ocean off Brazil, Uruguay, Argentina
