= Zeidora bahamondei =

Scientific classification
- Kingdom: Animalia
- Phylum: Mollusca
- Class: Gastropoda
- Subclass: Vetigastropoda
- Order: Lepetellida
- Family: Fissurellidae
- Subfamily: Zeidorinae
- Genus: Zeidora
- Species: Z. bahamondei

Binomial name
- Zeidora bahamondei Rehder, 1980

Species of gastropod

Zeidora bahamondei is a species of sea snail, a marine gastropod mollusk in the family Fissurellidae, the keyhole limpets and slit limpets.

== Description ==
The length of the shell attains 5.2 mm, its height 1.3 mm.

== Distribution ==
This marine species occurs off Easter Island.
