= Zeidora tasmanica =

Scientific classification
- Kingdom: Animalia
- Phylum: Mollusca
- Class: Gastropoda
- Subclass: Vetigastropoda
- Order: Lepetellida
- Family: Fissurellidae
- Subfamily: Zeidorinae
- Genus: Zeidora
- Species: Z. tasmanica

Binomial name
- Zeidora tasmanica (Beddome, 1883)

Synonyms
- Legrandia tasmanica Beddome, 1883; Zeidora legrandi Tate, 1894

Species of gastropod

Zeidora tasmanica is a species of sea snail, a marine gastropod mollusk in the family Fissurellidae, the keyhole limpets and slit limpets.

== Description ==
The length of the shell attains 5 mm, its height 0.8 mm.

(Described as Zeidora legrandi) The white, delicate shell is depressedly conical and cap-shaped. It is elliptic-oblong in basal outline, rounded behind, truncately rounded and deeply cleft in front, with a narrow sunken fissural band extending to the apex. The back is depressedly convex. The apex is minute and short, hooked and somewhat adpressed, almost reaching the posterior margin.

The ornament consists of concentric threadlets and obliquely radial threadlets, which produce an elegant cancellation of rhombic spaces. In the apical region the ornament is extremely fine, but beyond it the cancellation is visible to the unaided eye (there are about nine rows of rhombic spaces in a radial distance of 2 millimetres measured from the periphery). The margin of the aperture is closely crenulate-serrate. The fissural band is margined on each side by an elevated rounded keel, which is crenately sculptured. The scars on the fissural band are arched, sharp and close, but not contiguous.

The inside is glossy and smooth. The septum is narrowly crescentic (extending in the middle line to about one-fifth and on the sides to about one-fourth of the length of the aperture), much depressed posteriorly (about one-half the depth of the shell) becoming shallower on the anterior border, which almost reaches the base of the shell.

== Distribution ==
This marine species is endemic to Australia and occurs off Tasmania.
