= Zeidora antarctica =

Scientific classification
- Kingdom: Animalia
- Phylum: Mollusca
- Class: Gastropoda
- Subclass: Vetigastropoda
- Order: Lepetellida
- Family: Fissurellidae
- Subfamily: Zeidorinae
- Genus: Zeidora
- Species: Z. antarctica

Binomial name
- Zeidora antarctica Aldea, Zelaya & Troncoso, 2011

Synonyms
- Emarginula renkeri Engl, 2018

Species of gastropod

Zeidora antarctica is a species of sea snail, a marine gastropod mollusk in the family Fissurellidae, the keyhole limpets and slit limpets.

== Description ==
The length of the shell attains 16.2 mm, its height is 4.7 mm.

== Distribution ==
This marine species occurs in the Bellingshausen Sea, Antarctica.
