= Zeidora bigelowi =

Scientific classification
- Kingdom: Animalia
- Phylum: Mollusca
- Class: Gastropoda
- Subclass: Vetigastropoda
- Order: Lepetellida
- Family: Fissurellidae
- Genus: Zeidora
- Species: Z. bigelowi

Binomial name
- Zeidora bigelowi Pérez Farfante, 1947

Species of gastropod

Zeidora bigelowi is a species of sea snail, a marine gastropod mollusk in the family Fissurellidae, the keyhole limpets.

== Description ==
The length of the shell attains 2.5 mm, its height 1 mm.

== Distribution ==
This marine species occurs off Cuba at a depth between 320 m and 420 m.
