= Variemarginula fujitai =

Scientific classification
- Kingdom: Animalia
- Phylum: Mollusca
- Class: Gastropoda
- Subclass: Vetigastropoda
- Order: Lepetellida
- Family: Fissurellidae
- Subfamily: Hemitominae
- Genus: Variemarginula
- Species: V. fujitai

Binomial name
- Variemarginula fujitai (Habe, 1963)

Synonyms
- Emarginula foveolata fujitai Habe, 1953

Species of gastropod

Variemarginula fujitai is a species of sea snail, a marine gastropod mollusk in the family Fissurellidae, the keyhole limpets and slit limpets.
