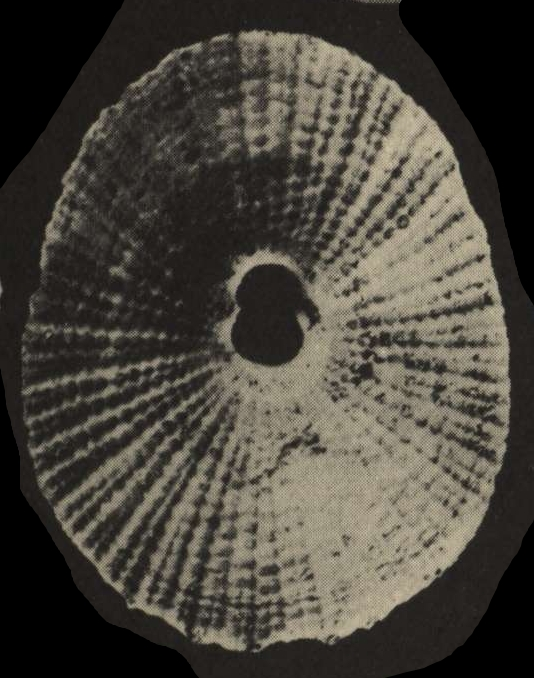
- Black-and-white photo of apical view of the shell which is the holotype of Monodilepas otagoensis.

Scientific classification
- Kingdom: Animalia
- Phylum: Mollusca
- Class: Gastropoda
- Subclass: Vetigastropoda
- Order: Lepetellida
- Family: Fissurellidae
- Genus: Monodilepas
- Species: M. otagoensis

Binomial name
- Monodilepas otagoensis Finlay, 1930

= Monodilepas otagoensis =

Species of gastropod

Monodilepas otagoensis is a species of small sea snail, a keyhole limpet, a subspecies of marine gastropod mollusc in the family Fissurellidae, the keyhole limpets and slit limpets.

This species has only been found in New Zealand.

== Description ==
Monodilepas otagoensis was originally discovered and described by Harold John Finlay in 1930.
