= Laevinesta =

Scientific classification
- Kingdom: Animalia
- Phylum: Mollusca
- Class: Gastropoda
- Subclass: Vetigastropoda
- Order: Lepetellida
- Family: Fissurellidae
- Subfamily: Emarginulinae
- Genus: Laevinesta; Pilsbry & McGinty, 1952

Type species
- Nesta atlantica Pérez Farfante, 1947

Genus of gastropods

Laevinesta is a genus of sea snails, marine gastropod mollusks in the family Fissurellidae, the keyhole limpets.

== Species ==
Species within the genus Laevinesta include:

- Laevinesta atlantica (Pérez Farfante, 1947)
