= Zeidora calceolina =

Scientific classification
- Kingdom: Animalia
- Phylum: Mollusca
- Class: Gastropoda
- Subclass: Vetigastropoda
- Order: Lepetellida
- Family: Fissurellidae
- Subfamily: Zeidorinae
- Genus: Zeidora
- Species: Z. calceolina

Binomial name
- Zeidora calceolina Adams, 1860

Synonyms
- Zeidora limatulaeformis Horikoshi, 1944

Species of gastropod

Zeidora calceolina is a species of sea snail, a marine gastropod mollusk in the family Fissurellidae, the keyhole limpets and slit limpets.

== Description ==
The length of the shell attains 4 mm.

(Original description in Latin) The oblong shell is elegantly ornamented with raised concentric and radiating lines. It has a median sulcus with raised sides. The tip is bent posteriorly. The septum shows a sharp edge and is intact.

== Distribution ==
It is found in Western Pacific off Japan, Korea and the Philippines and lives in depths of 50 to 200 meters. It was also collected from Mozambique, Indian Ocean.
