= Leurolepas =

Scientific classification
- Kingdom: Animalia
- Phylum: Mollusca
- Class: Gastropoda
- Subclass: Vetigastropoda
- Order: Lepetellida
- Family: Fissurellidae
- Subfamily: Fissurellinae
- Genus: Leurolepas; McLean, 1970

Type species
- Leurolepas roseola McLean, 1970

Genus of gastropods

Leurolepas is a genus of sea snails, marine gastropod mollusks in the family Fissurellidae, the keyhole limpets and slit limpets.

== Species ==
Species within the genus Leurolepas include:

- Leurolepas roseola McLean, 1970
