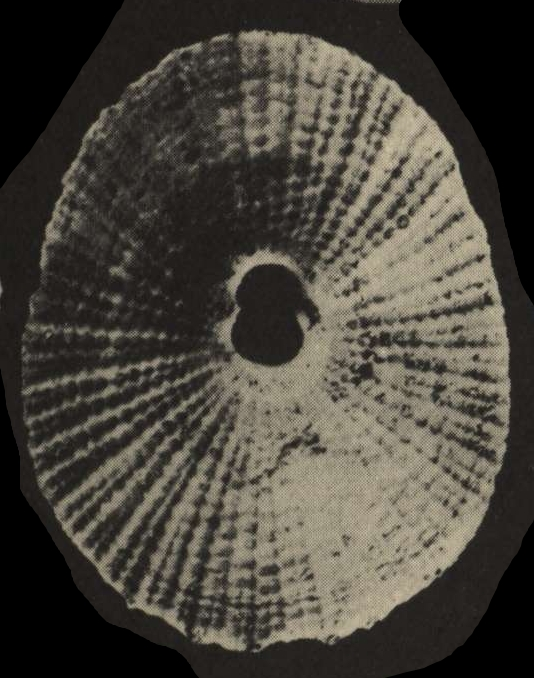
- Black-and-white photo of apical view of the holotype of Monodilepas otagoensis.

Scientific classification
- Kingdom: Animalia
- Phylum: Mollusca
- Class: Gastropoda
- Subclass: Vetigastropoda
- Order: Lepetellida
- Family: Fissurellidae
- Subfamily: Diodorinae
- Genus: Monodilepas; Finlay, 1927

Type species
- Lucapina monilifera Hutton, F.W., 1873

= Monodilepas =

Species of mollusc

Monodilepas is a species of small sea snail, a keyhole limpet, a marine gastropod mollusc in the family Fissurellidae, the keyhole limpets and slit limpets.

== Species ==
Species within the genus Monodilepas include:

- Monodilepas diemenensis Finlay, 1930
- Monodilepas monilifera Finlay, 1873
  - subspecies Monodilepas monilifera carnleyensis Powell, 1955
  - subspecies Monodilepas monilifera cookiana Dell, 1953
- Monodilepas otagoensis Finlay, 1930
- Monodilepas skinneri Finlay, 1928
