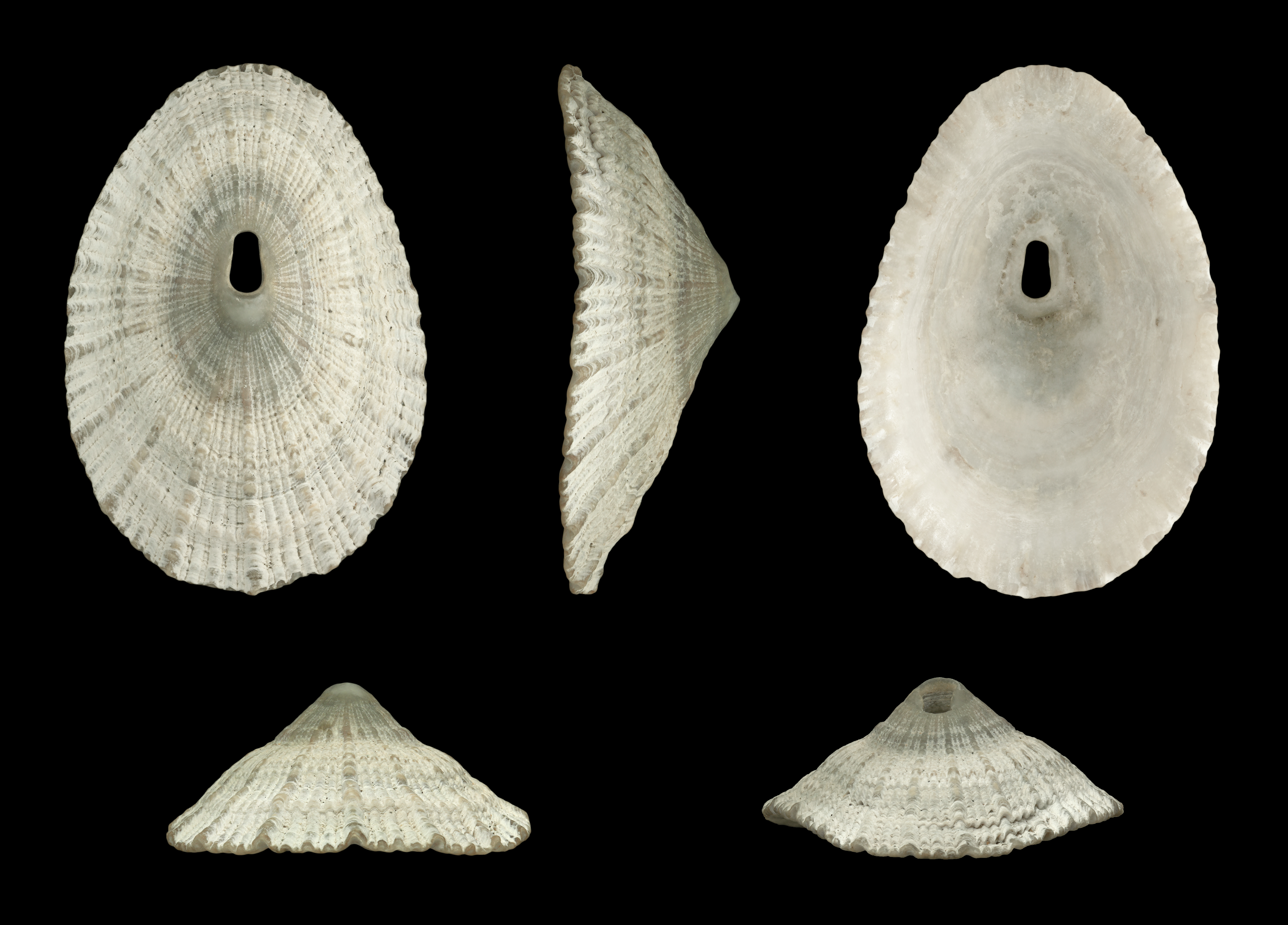
- Shells of Diodora italica.
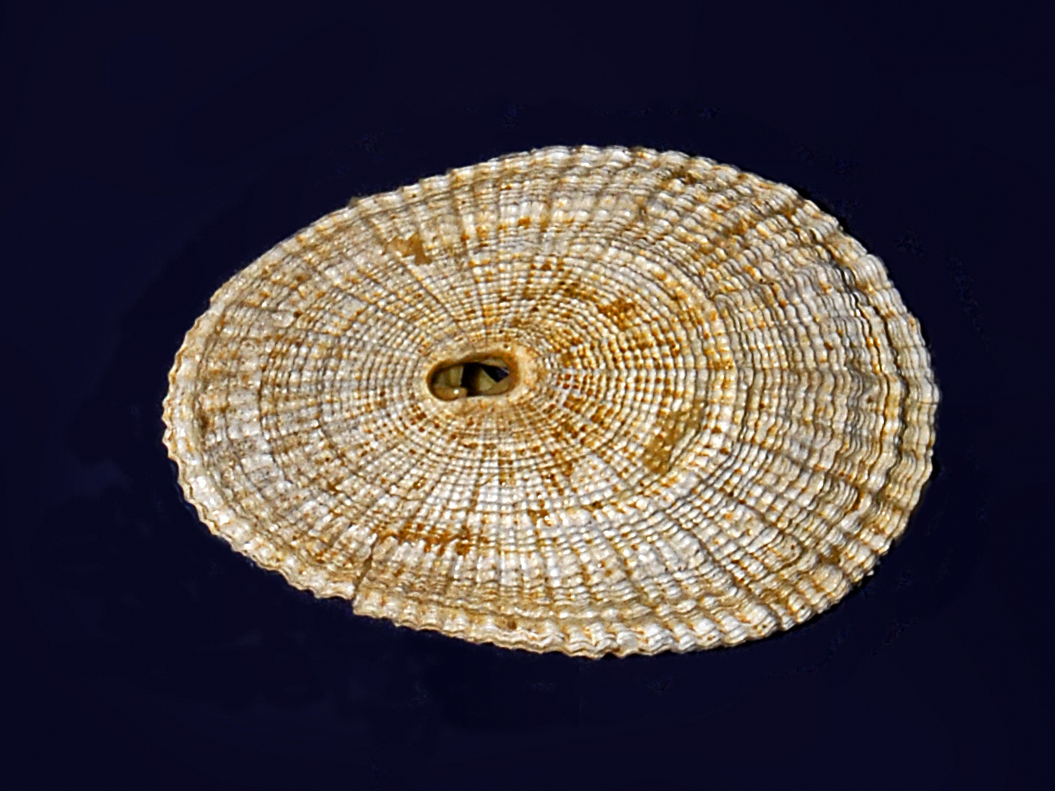
- Fossil shell of Diodora italica from Pliocene of Italy

Scientific classification
- Kingdom: Animalia
- Phylum: Mollusca
- Class: Gastropoda
- Subclass: Vetigastropoda
- Order: Lepetellida
- Family: Fissurellidae
- Genus: Diodora
- Species: D. italica

Binomial name
- Diodora italica (DeFrance, 1820)

Synonyms
- Fissurella costaria var. tilla de Gregorio, 1885; Fissurella italica DeFrance, 1820; Fissurella italica var. triamera de Gregorio, 1885; Fissurella mediterranea Gray in Sowerby I, 1835; Fissurella mediterranea var. depressa Monterosato, 1888; Fissurella neglecta Deshayes, 1830; Fissurella neglecta var. radiata Pallary, 1912; Fissurella vitoensis de Gregorio, 1885

= Diodora italica =

Species of gastropod

Diodora italica, the keyhole limpet or Italian keyhole limpet, is a sea snail or limpet, a marine prosobranch gastropod mollusk in the family Fissurellidae, the keyhole limpets.

== Fossil reports ==
The fossil records of this species dates back to the Miocene (age range: from 23.03 to 0.012 million years ago). These fossils have been found in Italy, Spain, Cyprus, Greece, Moldova and Slovakia.

== Description ==
The shells of Diodora italica can reach a length of about 56 millimetres (2.2 in) and a width of about 25 millimetres (0.98 in). The basic color is whitish or grayish with small radial ribs and sometimes with 8-10 dark gray or brownish bands radiating from the centre.

== Biology ==
Water for respiration and excretion is drawn in under the edge of the shell and exits through the "keyhole" at or near the apex. Like all other fissurellids, these sea snails are herbivores, and use the radula to scrape algae from rocks.

== Distribution and habitat ==
This species occurs in the Mediterranean Sea and the North Atlantic Ocean and lives on stony soils at a depth of about 10 meters.
