= Zeidora galapagensis =

Scientific classification
- Kingdom: Animalia
- Phylum: Mollusca
- Class: Gastropoda
- Subclass: Vetigastropoda
- Order: Lepetellida
- Family: Fissurellidae
- Subfamily: Zeidorinae
- Genus: Zeidora
- Species: Z. galapagensis

Binomial name
- Zeidora galapagensis (McLean, 1970)

Synonyms
- Nesta galapagensis McLean, 1970

Species of gastropod

Zeidora galapagensis is a species of sea snail, a marine gastropod mollusk in the family Fissurellidae, the keyhole limpets and slit limpets.

== Description ==
The length of the shell attains 5.5 mm, its height is 1.7 mm.

== Distribution ==
This marine species occurs off the Galapagos Islands.
