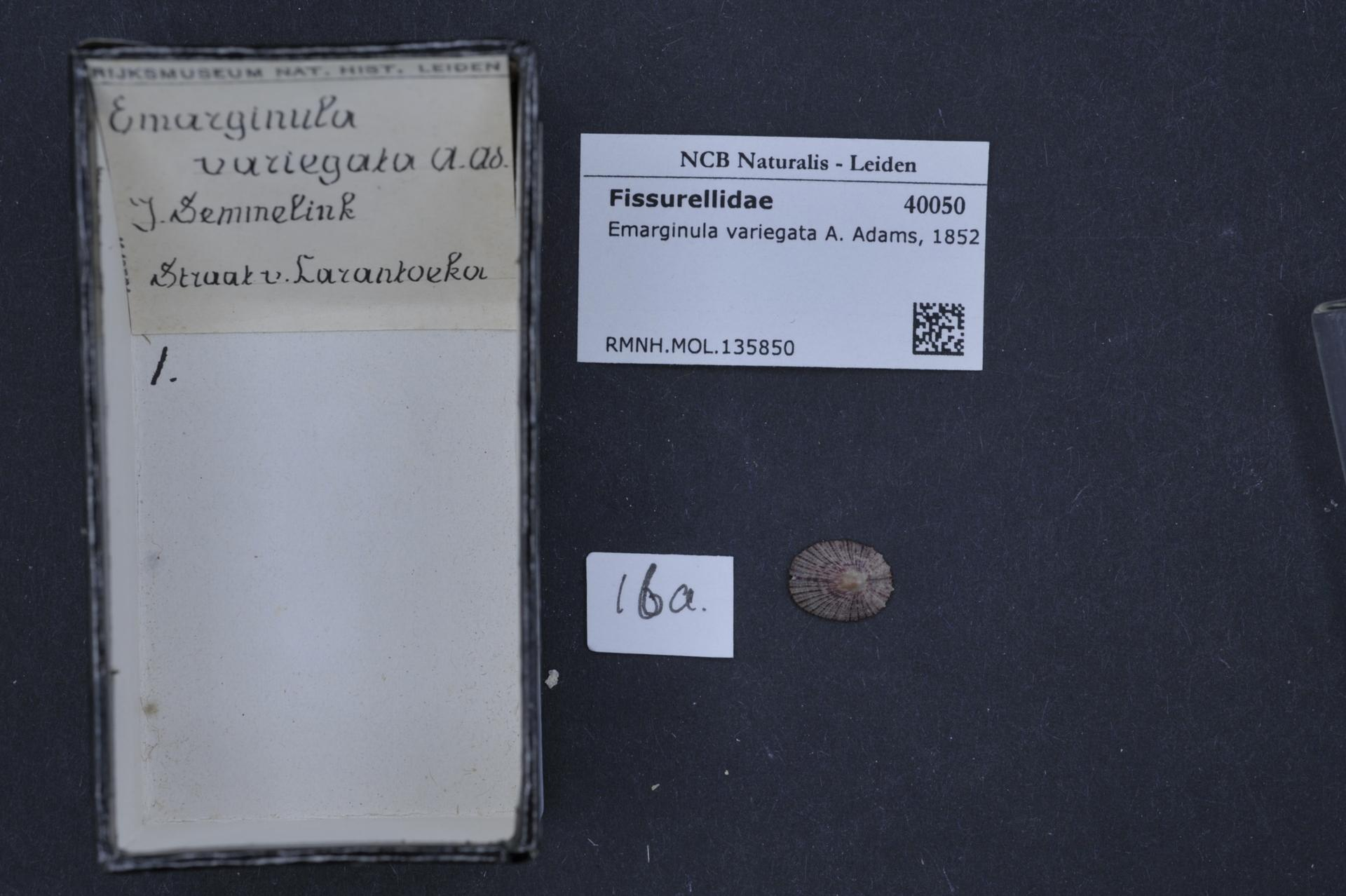
- Variemarginula variegata

Scientific classification
- Kingdom: Animalia
- Phylum: Mollusca
- Class: Gastropoda
- Subclass: Vetigastropoda
- Order: Lepetellida
- Family: Fissurellidae
- Subfamily: Hemitominae
- Genus: Variemarginula; McLean, 2011

Type species
- Emarginula variegata Adams, 1852

= Variemarginula =

Genus of gastropods

Variemarginula is a genus of sea snails, marine gastropod mollusks in the family Fissurellidae, the keyhole limpets and slit limpets.

== Species ==
Species within the genus Variemarginula include:

- Variemarginula fujitai (Habe, 1963)
- Variemarginula pileata Gould, 1859
- Variemarginula punctata (Adams, 1852)
- Variemarginula variegata (Adams, 1852)
