= Zeidora amamiensis =

Scientific classification
- Kingdom: Animalia
- Phylum: Mollusca
- Class: Gastropoda
- Subclass: Vetigastropoda
- Order: Lepetellida
- Family: Fissurellidae
- Subfamily: Zeidorinae
- Genus: Zeidora
- Species: Z. amamiensis

Binomial name
- Zeidora amamiensis (Habe, 1963)

Synonyms
- Nesta amamiensisHabe, 1963

Species of gastropod

Zeidora amamiensis is a species of sea snail, a marine gastropod mollusk in the family Fissurellidae, the keyhole limpets and slit limpets.

== Distribution ==
This marine species occurs off Amami Island, Japan.
