= Monodilepas skinneri =

Scientific classification
- Kingdom: Animalia
- Phylum: Mollusca
- Class: Gastropoda
- Subclass: Vetigastropoda
- Order: Lepetellida
- Family: Fissurellidae
- Genus: Monodilepas
- Species: M. skinneri

Binomial name
- Monodilepas skinneri Finlay, 1928

Species of gastropod

Monodilepas skinneri is a species of small sea snail, a keyhole limpet, a marine gastropod mollusc in the family Fissurellidae, the keyhole limpets and slit limpets. This species is endemic to the Chatham Islands, New Zealand.
