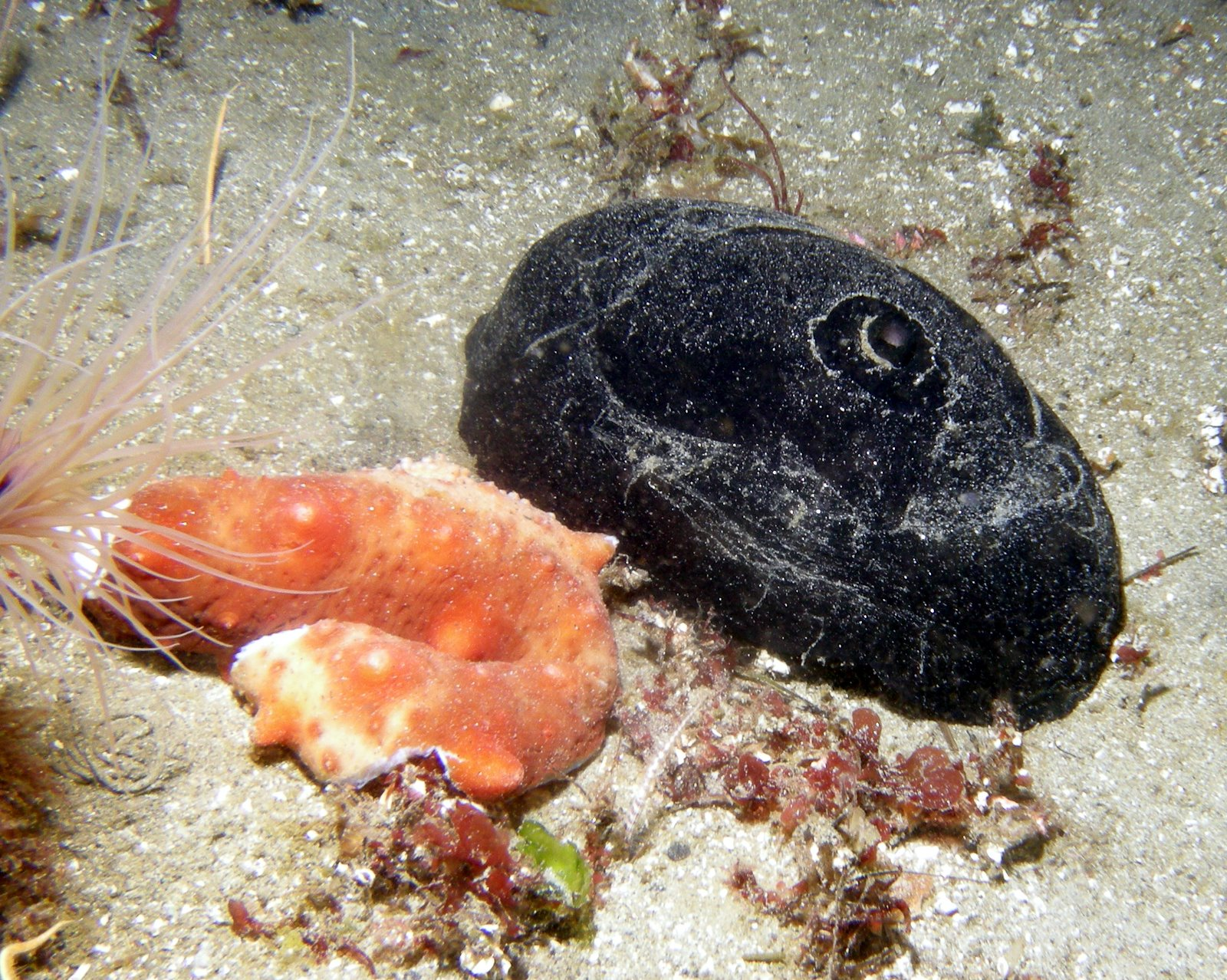
- Megathura crenulata on the right, and the warty sea cucumber Parastichopus parvimensis on the left

Scientific classification
- Kingdom: Animalia
- Phylum: Mollusca
- Class: Gastropoda
- Subclass: Vetigastropoda
- Order: Lepetellida
- Family: Fissurellidae
- Subfamily: Diodorinae
- Genus: Megathura
- Species: M. crenulata

Binomial name
- Megathura crenulata Sowerby I, 1825

= Megathura crenulata =

Species of mollusc

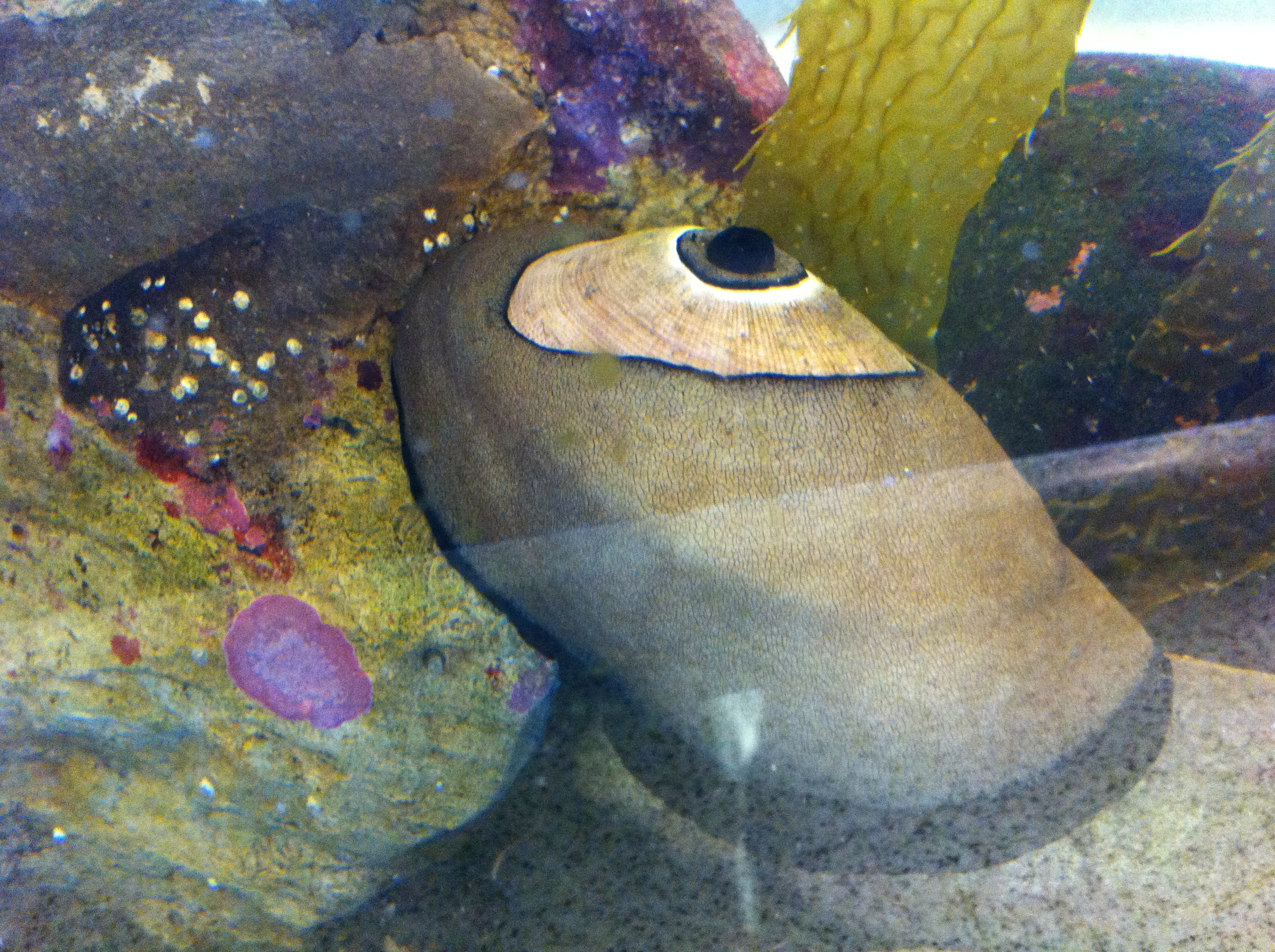
Living specimen of Megathura crenulata with mantle extended over much of its shell.

Megathura crenulata is a northeastern Pacific Ocean species of limpet in the family Fissurellidae known commonly as the great keyhole limpet or giant keyhole limpet. Megathura is a monotypic genus; in other words, this is the only species in that genus. This species occurs along the rocky coast of western North America, its distribution extending from Southern California to the Baja California peninsula in Mexico. It is found in the intertidal zone and in the sea up to a depth of 33 meters.

== Description ==
Limpets of this family have a hole at the top of the shell, the portal through which waste products are released. This makes them different from the true limpets, which release waste from the mantle beneath the shell. This species is one of the largest keyhole limpets.

== Biology ==
This species consumes a varied diet of plant, animal, protist, and algal material. It has been noted to consume filamentous cyanobacteria, diatoms, brown and red algaes such as seaweeds, seagrass, forams, hydrozoans, bryozoans, nematodes, bivalves, gastropods, crustaceans, and tunicates. The larger part of its diet is composed of brown and red algae, tunicates, hydrozoans of the genus Eudendrium and bryozoans of the genus Crisia.

M. crenulata has been used for experimental studies on gamete agglutination. Its blood contains a hemocyanin that appears blue due to its copper content. This protein carries oxygen as hemoglobin does in vertebrates. Unlike hemoglobin, the hemocyanin is not bound to cells but is simply dissolved in the hemolymph, the fluid part of the blood.

== Keyhole limpet hemocyanin ==
Keyhole limpet hemocyanin from Megathura crenulata is used as vaccine carrier protein. Keyhole limpet hemocyanin (KLH) is a copper containing respiratory protein, similar to hemoglobin in humans. KLH is a large protein that acts as the hapten carrier part of the vaccine component, and is so far thought to be non-toxic. The major potential use of KLH is for bladder carcinoma by stimulating a specific immune response, but there are many other medical uses such as stress assessment, understanding inflammatory conditions, and treating drug addiction. Vaccines and other KLH uses are in the research or trial phases. A liter of blood from a keyhole limpet will produce 20 grams of protein, which can be worth as much as $100,000.
