= Monodilepas monilifera =

Scientific classification
- Kingdom: Animalia
- Phylum: Mollusca
- Class: Gastropoda
- Subclass: Vetigastropoda
- Order: Lepetellida
- Family: Fissurellidae
- Genus: Monodilepas
- Species: M. monilifera

Binomial name
- Monodilepas monilifera (Hutton, 1873)

Synonyms
- Lucapina monilifera Hutton, 1873 (original combination)

Species of gastropod

Monodilepas monilifera is a species of small sea snail or limpet, a marine gastropod mollusc in the family Fissurellidae, the keyhole limpets.

This species is known only from New Zealand. Shell size 13-35 mm.

Subspecies are:

- Monodilepas monilifera carnleyensis Powell, 1955
- Monodilepas monilifera cookiana Dell, 1953
- Monodilepas monilifera monilifera (Hutton, 1873)
