= Laevinesta atlantica =

Scientific classification
- Kingdom: Animalia
- Phylum: Mollusca
- Class: Gastropoda
- Subclass: Vetigastropoda
- Order: Lepetellida
- Family: Fissurellidae
- Genus: Laevinesta
- Species: L. atlantica

Binomial name
- Laevinesta atlantica (Pérez Farfante, 1947)

Species of gastropod

Laevinesta atlantica is a species of sea snail, a marine gastropod mollusk in the family Fissurellidae, the keyhole limpets.

== Description ==
A species of sea snail often residing in light coloured shells and are a specific species within the genus of Laevvinesta.
