= Keyhole limpet hemocyanin =

Metalloprotein of giant keyhole limpets

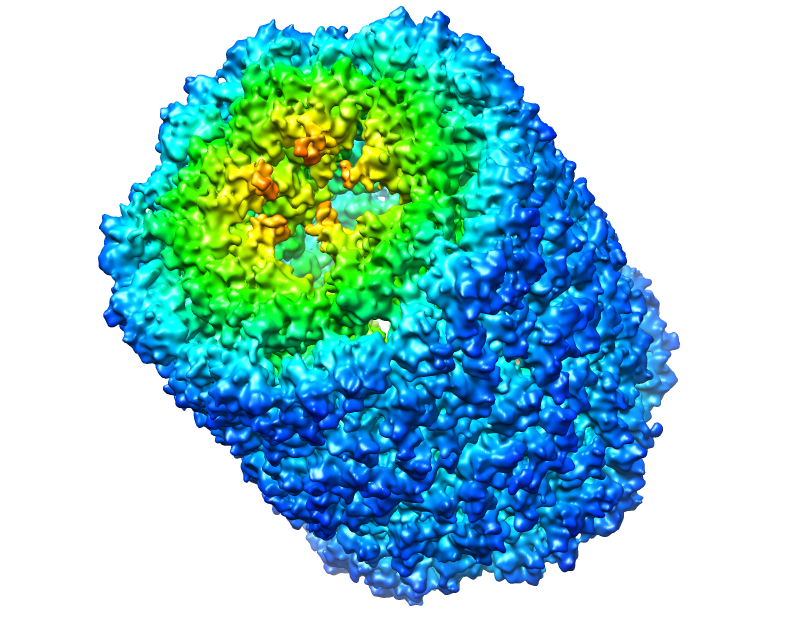
9Å cryoEM reconstruction of Keyhole limpet hemocyanin (KLH). EMDB entry EMD-1569.

Keyhole limpet hemocyanin (KLH) is a large, multisubunit, oxygen-carrying, metalloprotein that is found in the hemolymph of the giant keyhole limpet, Megathura crenulata, a species of keyhole limpet that lives off the coast of California, from Monterey Bay to Isla Asuncion off Baja California.

== Protein properties ==
There are two keyhole limpet hemocyanin genes, termed KLH1 and KLH2 which share around 60% identity at the protein level. Both encode large glycosylated proteins consisting of around 3400 amino acids and a molecular weight of around 390,000 daltons, excluding the glycosylation. The protein oligomerises to form a barrel shaped didecameric complex which is composed of 20 monomers. Each domain of a KLH subunit contains two copper atoms that together bind a single oxygen molecule (O_{2}). When oxygen is bound to hemocyanin, the molecule takes on a distinctive transparent, opalescent blue color, due to the Cu^{2+} state of the copper. In the absence of oxygen, the bound copper is found as Cu^{1+} and hemocyanin is colorless. The KLH protein is potently immunogenic, but does not cause an adverse immune response in humans. It is therefore highly prized as a vaccine carrier protein. Because of its size and glycosylation, KLH protein cannot be reproduced synthetically; it is available only as a purified biological product from the keyhole limpet Megathura crenulata.

== Purification ==
KLH is purified from the hemolymph of Megathura crenulata by a series of steps that typically includes ammonium sulfate precipitation and dialysis, and may involve chromatographic purification to obtain the highest purity. KLH purification may also include endotoxin removal, but this step is often unnecessary because the endotoxin serves as an adjuvant when injected for antibody production.

If the protein becomes denatured or if the copper ions are lost in the purification process, the opalescent blue color disappears and the solution becomes a dull grayish color. Denaturation of KLH also results in a tendency of the protein to aggregate and precipitate from solution.

== Use in biotechnology ==
Keyhole limpet hemocyanin (KLH) is used extensively as a carrier protein in the production of antibodies for research, biotechnology and therapeutic applications. Haptens are substances with a low molecular weight such as peptides, small proteins and drug molecules that are generally not immunogenic and require the aid of a carrier protein to stimulate a response from the immune system in the form of antibody production. KLH is the most widely employed carrier protein for this purpose. KLH is an effective carrier protein for several reasons. Its large size and numerous epitopes generate a substantial immune response, and abundance of lysine residues for coupling haptens allows a high hapten:carrier protein ratio, increasing the likelihood of generating hapten-specific antibodies. In addition, because KLH is derived from the limpet, a gastropod, it is phylogenetically distant from mammalian proteins, thus reducing false positives in immunologically based research techniques in mammalian model organisms.

KLH can also be a challenging molecule to work with because of its propensity to aggregate and precipitate. Aggregates remain immunogenic, but limit the ability to conjugate haptens, and are difficult to manipulate in the laboratory. A high-quality KLH preparation with clear opalescent blue color is the best indicator of KLH solubility.

== Hapten coupling ==
Haptens can be coupled to KLH using several methods. A simple one-step coupling can be performed using the carbodiimide crosslinker EDC to covalently attach carboxyls to primary amines. This method is the simplest to perform and the "random" orientation allows for antibody generation against all possible epitopes, but it generally results in some degree of polymerization, which decreases solubility making the conjugate more difficult to handle.

KLH can be activated with the crosslinker Sulfo-SMCC, which converts lysine residues to sulfhydryl-reactive maleimide groups. A sulfhydryl-containing hapten can then be reacted with the KLH to complete the immunogen without causing polymerization. The specificity of this reaction is ideal for situations where the cysteine is located away from the desired epitope (e.g. in peptides where a terminal cysteine can be added to either end of the peptide). Maleimide activated KLH, where the first part of this two step procedure has been completed, is commercially available.

== Other carrier proteins ==
- Concholepas concholepas hemocyanin (marketed as Blue Carrier)
- Bovine serum albumin (BSA)
- Cationized BSA (cBSA)
- Ovalbumin
- CRM197

== Use in cancer therapy ==
KLH is being tested in a variety of cancer vaccines, including non-Hodgkin's lymphoma, cutaneous melanoma, breast and bladder cancer. These vaccines contain specific tumor-associated antigens conjugated to KLH to stimulate anti-tumor immune responses which can destroy tumor cells.

The rapidly growing interest in therapeutic vaccines (i.e. active immunotherapies) for cancer and the documented efficacy of KLH as a superior carrier protein for cancer vaccines are creating a significant biopharmaceutical market for KLH formulations.

Assays to monitor humoral immune responses against KLH in human serum have been developed to facilitate optimal use of biomedical KLH applications.

== Ecological considerations ==
Because of the beneficial uses of KLH, the Giant Keyhole Limpet, from which KLH is derived, has been a subject of growing concern among fisheries biologists in the state of California due to the possibility of overharvest of the species for commercial purposes. Giant Keyhole Limpets are not an abundant species to begin with, and some divers have reported a decline in their populations. In a 2006 report from the Marine Science Institute, University of California, Santa Barbara, scientists state that they are "very concerned about the emerging fishery" for Giant Keyhole Limpets and suggest the potential exists to "decimate their populations". To help assure a secure long-term source of KLH for the many Federally sponsored biomedical research programs using KLH, Federal agencies including the National Institutes of Health and the National Science Foundation have also sponsored research to establish sustainable mariculture production of the Giant Keyhole Limpet.
