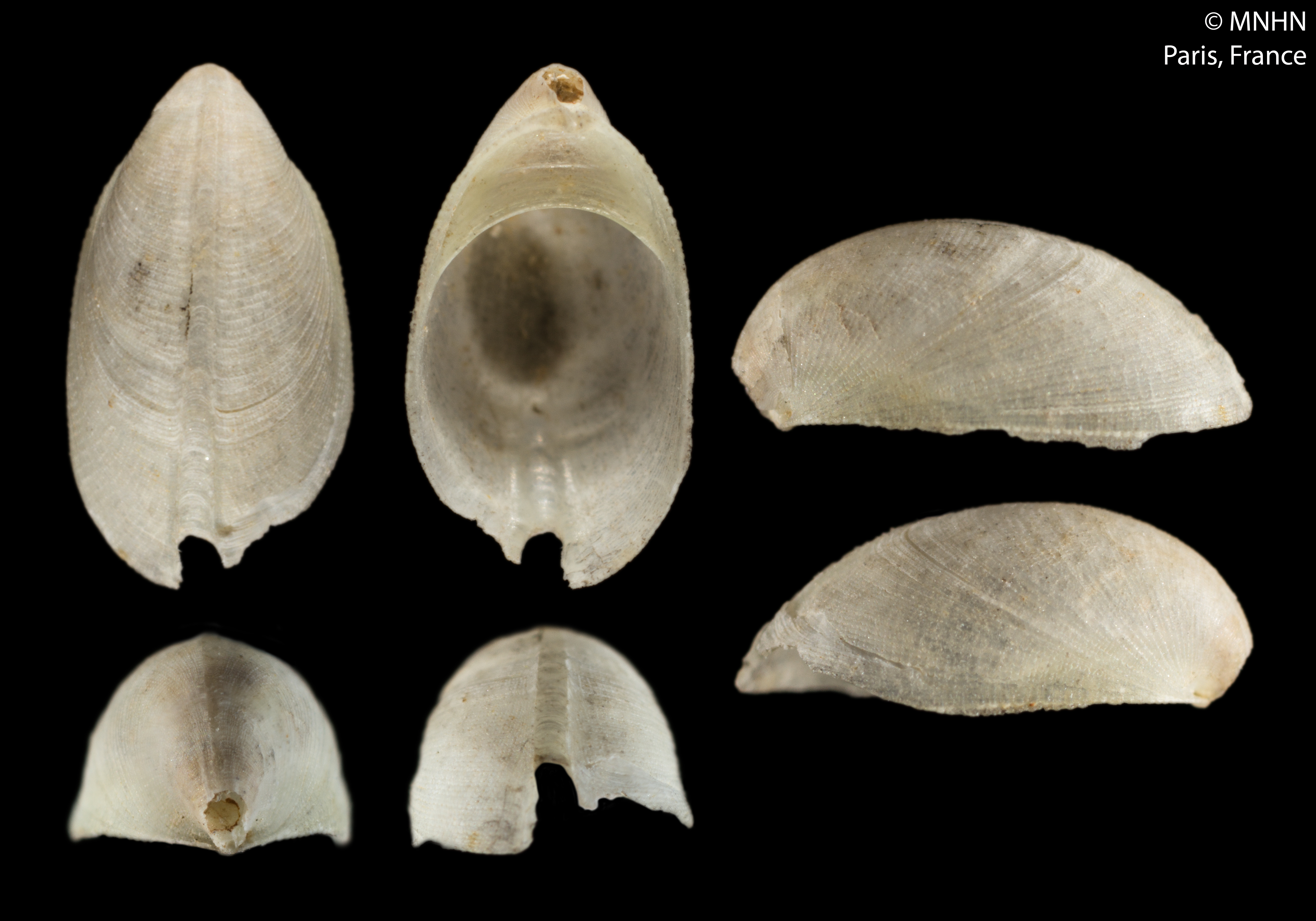
- Shell of Zeidora crepidula

Scientific classification
- Kingdom: Animalia
- Phylum: Mollusca
- Class: Gastropoda
- Subclass: Vetigastropoda
- Order: Lepetellida
- Superfamily: Fissurelloidea
- Family: Fissurellidae
- Subfamily: Zeidorinae
- Genus: Zeidora; Adams, 1860

Type species
- Zeidora calceolina Adams, 1860

Synonyms
- † Crepiemarginula Seguenza, 1880; Emarginula (Nesta) H. Adams, 1870 ·; Legrandia Beddome, 1883 (invalid: junior homonym of Legrandia Hanley, 1872); Nesta Adams, 1870; Zidora Fischer, 1885 (invalid: unjustified emendation of Zeidora Adams, 1860)

= Zeidora =

Genus of gastropods

Zeidora is a genus of sea snails, marine gastropod mollusks in the family Fissurellidae, the keyhole limpets.

== Description ==
The genus Zeidora was instituted by A. Adams in 1860, for the reception of two Japanese shells having the outer aspect of Emarginula and an internal shelf as in Crepidula.

The shell resembles Emarginula, with the margin of the aperture crenulated and anteriorly deeply fissured, but there is posteriorly an internal, flat, semilunar septum present, which distinguishes this genus from any other Fissurellidae.

== Species ==
Species within the genus Zeidora include:

- Zeidora amamiensis (Habe, 1963)
- Zeidora antarctica Aldea, Zelaya & Troncoso, 2011
- Zeidora bahamondei Rehder, 1980
- Zeidora bigelowi Pérez Farfante, 1947
- Zeidora calceolina Adams, 1860
- † Zeidora clypeata (Lamarck, 1803)
- Zeidora crepidula Simone & Cunha, 2014
- Zeidora flabellum (Dall, 1896)
- Zeidora galapagensis (McLean, 1970)
- † Zeidora geigeri Helwerda & Wesselingh, 2014
- † Zeidora gruelli R. Janssen, 1984
- † Zeidora lacipidinae Lozouet, 1999
- † Zeidora ligustica Bellardi, 1878
- Zeidora lodderae (Tate & May, 1900)
- Zeidora macleani Gálvez & Torres, 2019
- Zeidora maoria Powell, 1936
- Zeidora milerai Espinosa, Ortea & Fernandez-Garces, 2004
- Zeidora naufraga Watson, 1883
- Zeidora neritica Espinosa, Ortea & Fernandez-Garces, 2004
- Zeidora nesta (Pilsbry, 1890)
- Zeidora pussa Simone & Cunha, 2014
- Zeidora reticulata Adams, 1862
- Zeidora tasmanica (Beddome, 1883)
- † Zeidora virodunensis Lozouet, 1999

Species brought into synonymy

- Zeidora candida (Adams, 1870): synonym of Zeidora nesta (Pilsbry, 1890)
- Zeidora legrandi Tate, 1894: synonym of Zeidora tasmanica (Beddome, 1883)
- Zeidora limatulaeformis Horikoshi, 1944: synonym of Zeidora calceolina A. Adams, 1860
- † Zeidora seguenzae R. B. Watson, 1883: synonym of † Zeidora ligustica Bellardi, 1878
