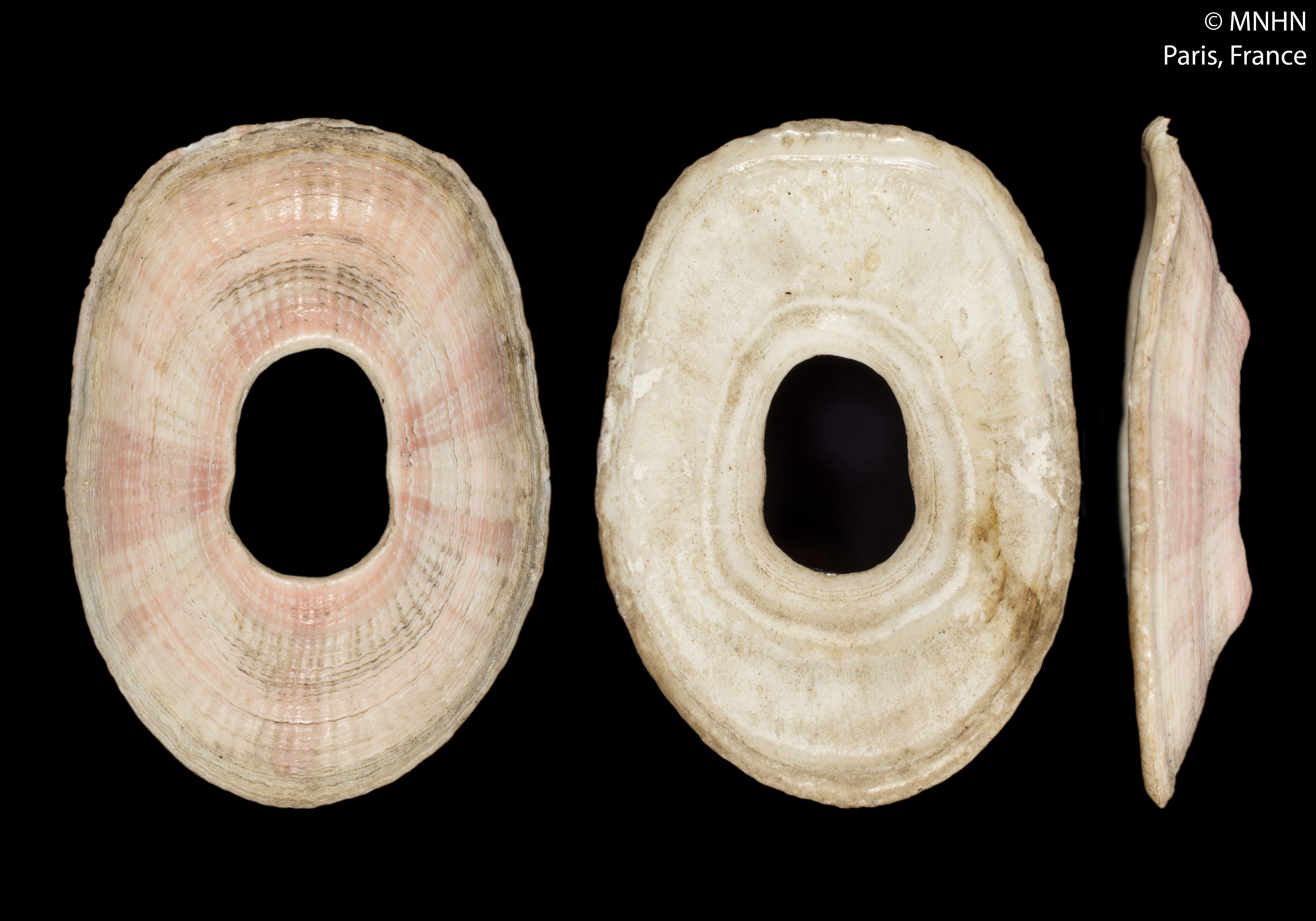
- Shell of Fissurellidea megatrema

Scientific classification
- Kingdom: Animalia
- Phylum: Mollusca
- Class: Gastropoda
- Subclass: Vetigastropoda
- Order: Lepetellida
- Superfamily: Fissurelloidea
- Family: Fissurellidae
- Genus: Fissurellidea d'Orbigny, 1841

Type species
- Fissurellidea megatrema d'Orbigny, 1839

Synonyms
- Fissurella (Fissurellidea) d'Orbigny, 1839; Fissurellidaea (misspelling of genus); Megatebennus Pilsbry, 1890

= Fissurellidea =

Genus of gastropods

Fissurellidea is a genus of sea snails, marine gastropod mollusks in the subfamily Diodorinae of the family Fissurellidae, the keyhole limpets.

== Species ==
Species within the genus Fissurellidea include:

- Fissurellidea bimaculata Dall, 1871
- Fissurellidea genevievae Dautzenberg, 1929
- Fissurellidea megatrema d'Orbigny, 1839
- Fissurellidea patagonica (Strebel, 1907)

Species brought into synonymy

- Fissurellidea annulus Odhner, 1932: synonym of Pupillaea annulus (Odhner, 1932)
- Fissurellidea aperta (Sowerby I, 1825): synonym of Pupillaea aperta (Sowerby I, 1825)
- Fissurellidea genevievae Dautzenberg, 1929: synonym of Medusafissurella dubia (L. Reeve, 1849)
- Fissurellidea incarnata (Krauss, 1848): synonym of Dendrofissurella scutellum hiantula (Lamarck, 1822)
- Fissurellidea multilineata W. H. Turton, 1932: synonym of Dendrofissurella scutellum hiantula (Lamarck, 1822) (junior synonym)
- Fissurellidea nigrostrigata W. H. Turton, 1932: synonym of Dendrofissurella scutellum hiantula (Lamarck, 1822) (junior synonym)
- Fissurellidea sella G. B. Sowerby II, 1862: synonym of Dendrofissurella scutellum scutellum (Gmelin, 1791)
