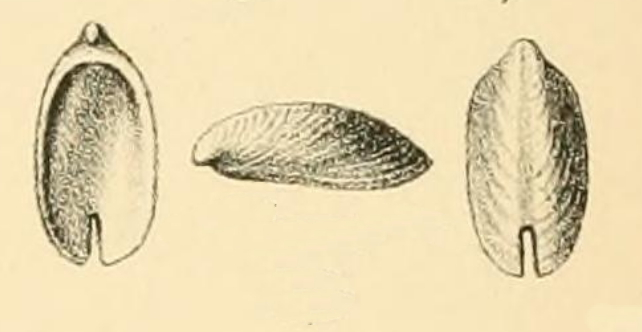
- Shells of Zeidora nesta (holotype)

Scientific classification
- Kingdom: Animalia
- Phylum: Mollusca
- Class: Gastropoda
- Subclass: Vetigastropoda
- Order: Lepetellida
- Family: Fissurellidae
- Subfamily: Zeidorinae
- Genus: Zeidora
- Species: Z. nesta

Binomial name
- Zeidora nesta (Pilsbry, 1890)

Synonyms
- Clypidina candida Adams, 1851; Emarginula nesta Pilsbry, 1890 (original combination); Nesta candida Adams, 1870; Zeidora candida (Adams, 1870)

= Zeidora nesta =

Species of gastropod

Zeidora nesta is a species of sea snail, a marine gastropod mollusk in the family Fissurellidae, the keyhole limpets and slit limpets.

== Description ==
The length of the shell is 5.5 mm, its height 1.3 mm.

(Original description) The thin, snowy-white shell is oblong-oval. It is beautifully decussated with elevated very delicate concentric and radiating lirulae. The; dorsal sulcus has distinct sides, transversely striated. The front fissure is strong. The margin of the aperture is a little thickened behind and delicately crenulated all around.

== Distribution ==
This species occurs in the Red Sea, in the Persian Gulf and along Réunion
