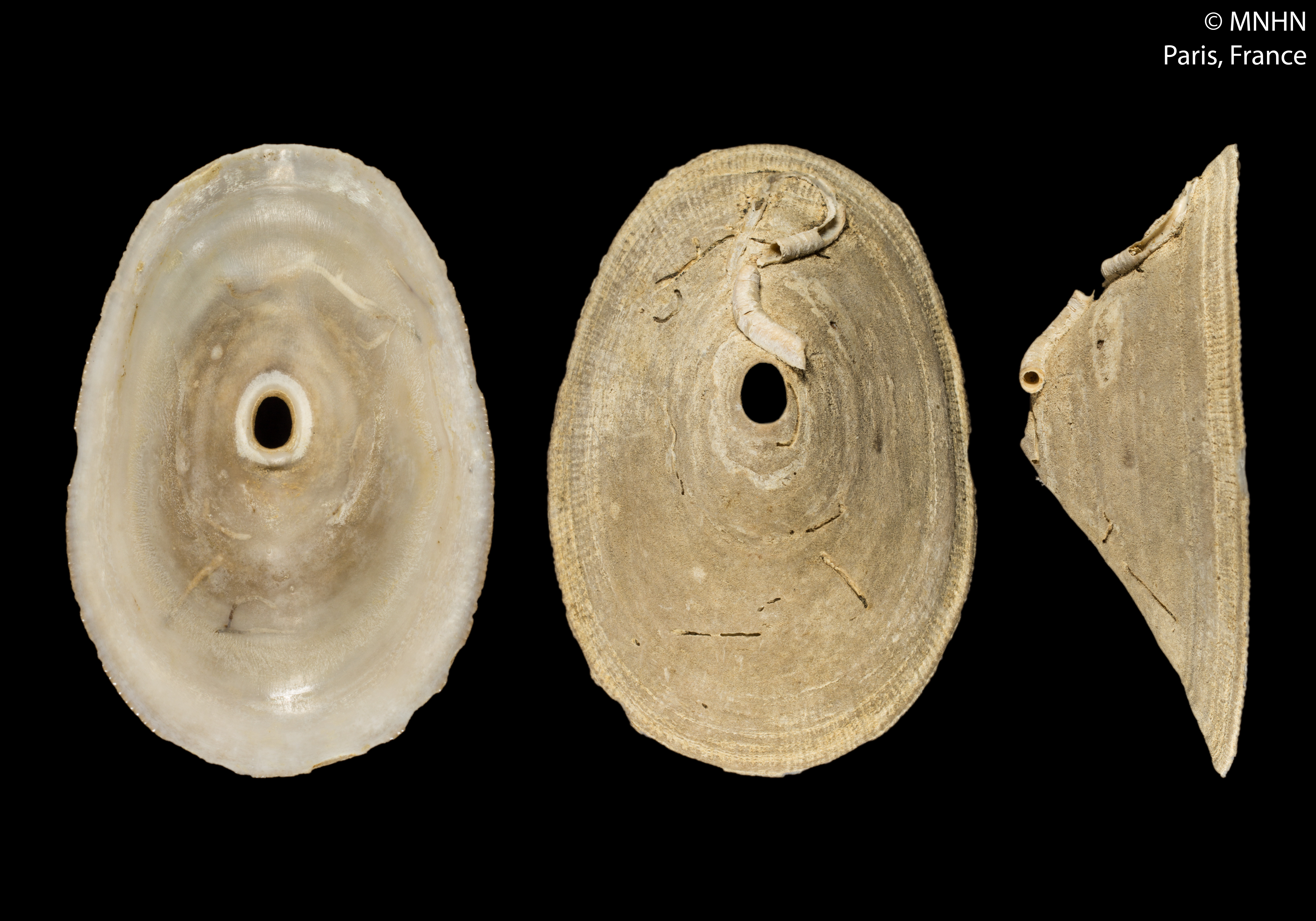
- Shell of Cosmetalepas massieri

Scientific classification
- Kingdom: Animalia
- Phylum: Mollusca
- Class: Gastropoda
- Subclass: Vetigastropoda
- Order: Lepetellida
- Superfamily: Fissurelloidea
- Family: Fissurellidae
- Genus: Cosmetalepas; Iredale, 1924

Type species
- Fissurella concatenata Crosse & P. Fischer, 1864

= Cosmetalepas =

Genus of gastropods

Cosmetalepas, common name the pitted keyhole limpets, is a genus of minute deepwater keyhole limpets, marine gastropod mollusks or micromollusks in the family Fissurellidae, the keyhole limpets and slit limpets.

== Species ==
- Cosmetalepas africana Tomlin, 1926
- Cosmetalepas concatenata (Crosse & Fischer, 1864)
- Cosmetalepas massieri Poppe, Tagaro & Sarino, 2011
- Cosmetalepas scutellum (Gmelin)

Species brought into synonymy

- Cosmetalepas africanus [sic] : synonym of Cosmetalepas africana (Tomlin, 1926)
- Cosmetalepas concatenatus (Crosse & Fischer, 1864): synonym of Cosmetalepas concatenata (Crosse & Fischer, 1864)
