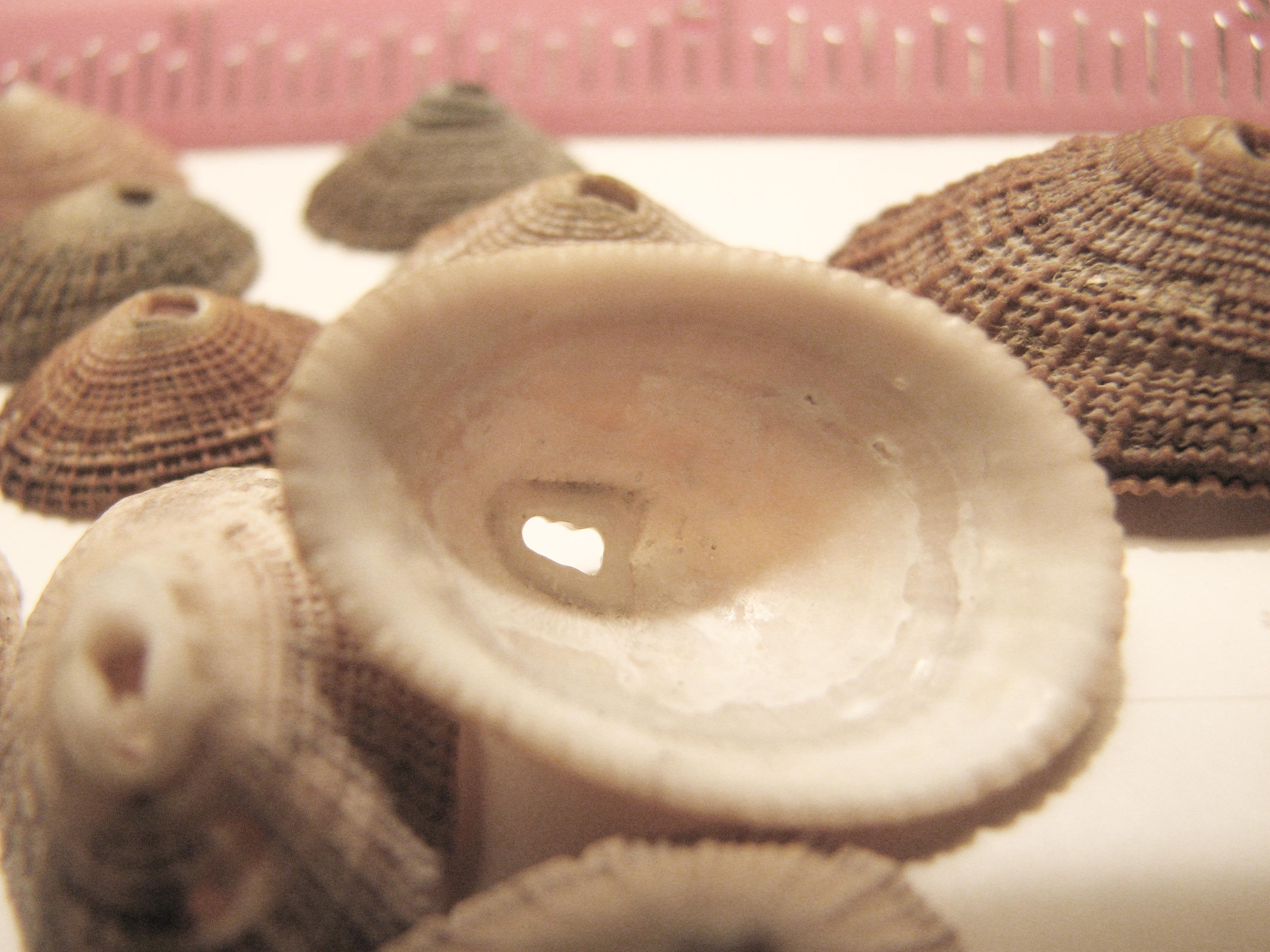
- A group of shells of Diodora cayenensis

Scientific classification
- Kingdom: Animalia
- Phylum: Mollusca
- Class: Gastropoda
- Subclass: Vetigastropoda
- Order: Lepetellida
- Superfamily: Fissurelloidea; Fleming, 1822
- Family: Fissurellidae; Fleming, 1822

Type genus
- Diodora J.E. Gray, 1821

Genera
- See text

= Fissurellidae =

Fissurellidae Temporal range: Triassic–Recent

Family of limpet-like sea snails

Fissurellidae, commonly called keyhole limpets or slit limpets, is a taxonomic family of small to medium-sized limpet-like sea snails, marine gastropod molluscs in the clade Vetigastropoda.

Their common name derives from the small hole in the apex of their cone-like shells. Although superficially resembling "true" limpets, they are in fact not closely related to them.

== Distribution ==
The distribution of fissurellids is worldwide, from cold waters to tropical waters.

== Habitat ==
Fissurellids live in habitats on and under rocks in the lower intertidal zones to deeper waters.

== Shell description ==
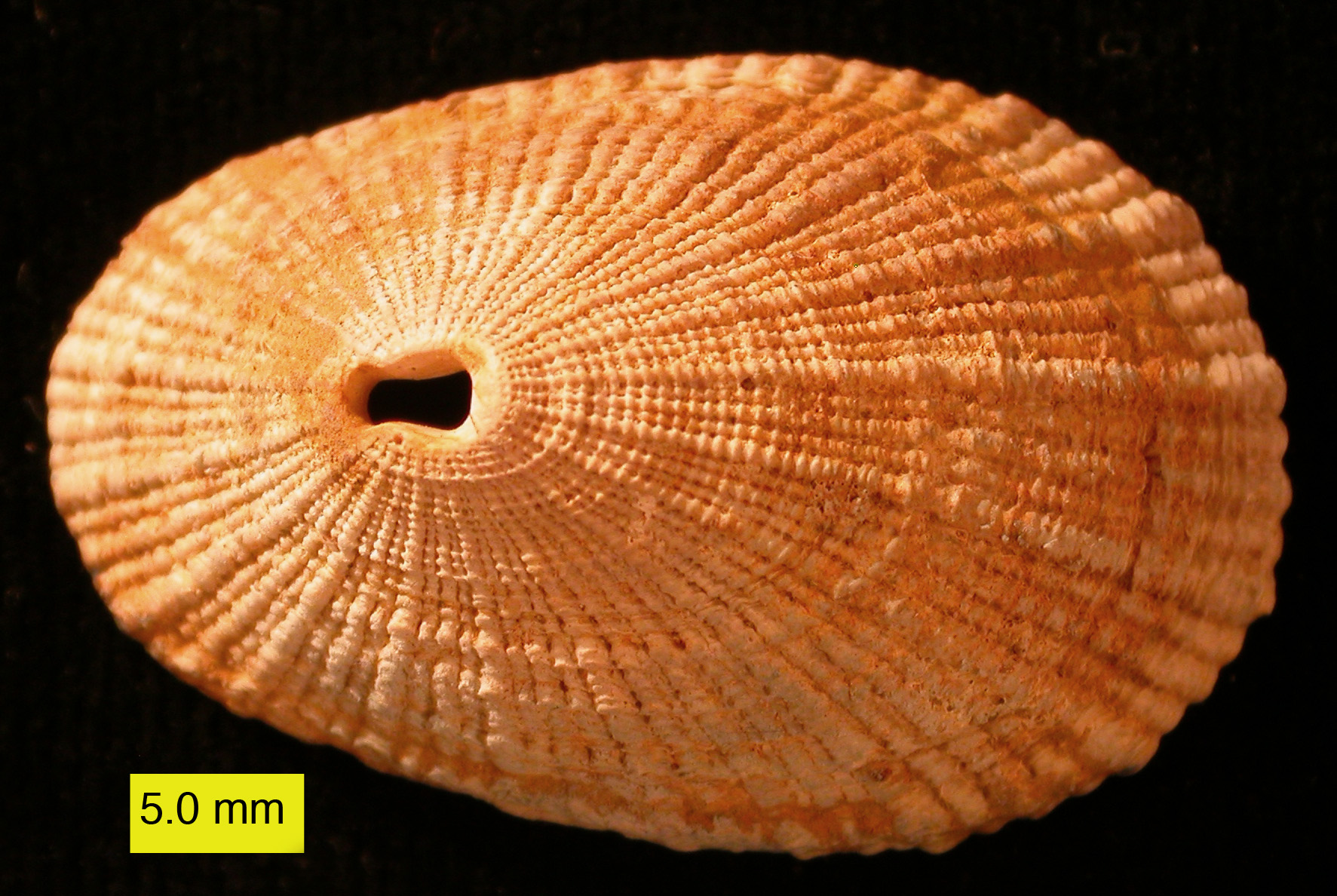
A fossil shell of Diodora italica from the Pliocene of Cyprus.

Keyhole limpets somewhat resemble true limpets because of the simple conical shape of their shells, but in reality they are not closely related to true limpets, which are in the clade Patellogastropoda.

This conical shape and the low profile of the shell allow keyhole limpets to withstand wave attack on exposed rocks to which they attach firmly with their strong, muscular foot.

The shell may vary in color and pattern. The shell has a reticulate (= net-like) structure with strong radial ribs and lacks an operculum.

The shell ranges from 3 mm to 13.2 cm. The great keyhole limpet (Megathura crenulata) measures up to 13.2 cm.

For respiration, the shells of fissurellids have a single apical or subapical perforation ("keyhole"). This opening at the top allows a direct exit of exhalant water currents together with waste products from the mantle cavity. The water enters under the edge of the shell near the head and passes over large paired gills. Most young species in this family have a marginal slit in the middle of the anterior end of the spiral shell. Some species possess just a short internal groove at the anterior end. The paired organs in the mantle cavity represent a primitive condition in gastropods.

The soft body consists of a well-developed head, a short muzzle. It has a broad and flat foot and a well-developed mantle. This foot exerts a strong suction, adhering the keyhole limpet to its hard substratum. The mantle extends in some species partly or completely (as in Megathura crenulata) over the shell. The tentacles at the epipodium (the lateral grooves between foot and mantle) are well developed. The species in Medusafissurella have numerous subequal tentacles at the propodium, while the species in Dendrofissurella have an outgrowth with main trunk and side branches at the propodium. The eyes are situated on rudimentary pedicels at their outer bases. The sides are ornamented with short cirri. There are two, symmetrical branchial plumes . The anal siphon occupies the anterior notch or perforated summit of the shell.

In addition to the possession of this hole, slit or groove, keyhole limpets differ in several other ways both internally and externally from true limpets.

== Feeding habits ==
Keyhole limpets are in essence herbivorous, feeding primarily on algae, but are also detritus feeders. They play an important role in marine ecosystems by controlling the growth of algae on rocky substrates.

A few species in the genera Diodora and Emarginella are carnivorous, feeding on sponges. Puncturella has been reported to digest diatoms and detritus. Puncturella aethiopica feeds mainly on Foraminifera. They are also prey for various marine animals, including starfish and some mollusk-eating birds.

== Taxonomy ==
Family Fissurellidae Fleming, 1822

- Subfamily Diodorinae Odhner, 1932
- Subfamily Emarginulinae Children, 1834
- Subfamily Fissurellinae Fleming, 1822
- Subfamily Hemitominae Kuroda, Habe & Oyama, 1971: synonym of Zeidorinae Naef, 1913
- Subfamily Zeidorinae Naef, 1913

This classification was based by Bouchet & Rocroi on the studies by Keen (in Moore) (1960), Christiaens (1973) and McMean (1984).

Aktipis S.W., Boehm E. & Giribet G. (2011) then raised the tribe Diodorini to the status of subfamily Diodorinae.

== Genera ==
Genera within the family Fissurellidae include:

- Agariste Monterosato, 1892
- Altrix Palmer, 1942
- Amblychilepas Pilsbry, 1890
- † Arginula K. van W. Palmer, 1937
- † Atractotrema Cossmann, 1888
- Buchanania Lesson, 1830
- Clathrosepta McLean & Geiger, 1998
- Clypidina Gray, 1847
- Cornisepta McLean & Geiger, 1998
- Cosmetalepas Iredale, 1924
- Cranopsis Adams, 1860 (uncertain, validity debated)
- Dendrofissurella Mclean and Kilburn, 1986
- Diodora Gray, 1821
- Emarginella Pilsbry, 1891
- Emarginula Lamarck, 1801
- † Entomella Cossmann, 1888
- Fissurella Bruguière, 1789
- Fissurellidea d'Orbigny, 1841
- Fissurisepta Seguenza, 1863
- Hemimarginula McLean, 2011
- Hemitoma Swainson, 1840
- Laeviemarginula Habe In Kuroda, 1953
- Laevinesta Pilsbry and McGinty, 1952
- Leurolepas J. H. McLean, 1970
- Lucapina Sowerby II, 1835
- Lucapinella Pilsbry, 1890
- Macroschisma Sowerby, 1839
- Manganesepta McLean & Geiger, 1998
- Medusafissurella Mclean and Kilburn, 1986
- Megathura Pilsbry, 1890
- Monodilepas Finlay, 1927
- Montfortia Récluz, 1843
- Montfortista Iredale, 1929
- Montfortula Iredale, 1915
- Montfortulana Habe, 1961
- Nesta Adams, 1870
- Octomarginula McLean, 2011
- † Palaeoloxotoma Hansen, 2019
- Parmaphorella Strebel, 1907
- Profundisepta McLean & Geiger, 1998
- Puncturella R. T. Lowe, 1827
- Pupillaea Gray In Sowerby, 1835
- Rimula DeFrance, 1827
- Rimulanax Iredale, 1924 (taxon inquerendum)
- Scelidotoma Choe, Yoon and Habe, 1992
- Scutus Montfort, 1810
- Stromboli Berry, 1954
- Tugali Gray in Dieffenbach, 1843
- Tugalina Habe, 1953
- Vacerrena Iredale, 1958
- Variemarginula McLean, 2011
- Zeidora A. Adams, 1860

Genera brought into synonymy

- Austroglyphis Cotton & Godfrey, 1934: synonym of Diodora Gray, 1821
- Aviscutum Iredale, 1940: synonym of Scutus Montfort, 1810
- Capiluna Gray, 1857: synonym of Diodora Gray, 1821
- Cemoria Risso, 1826 [ex Leach MS]: synonym of Puncturella Lowe, 1827
- Cremoria [Gray, 1842]: synonym of Puncturella Lowe, 1827
- Elegidion Iredale, 1924: synonym of Diodora J. E. Gray, 1821
- Entomella Cotton, 1945: synonym of Emarginula Lamarck, 1801
- Fissuridea Swainson, 1840: synonym of Diodora J. E. Gray, 1821
- Glyphis Carpenter, 1857: synonym of Diodora J. E. Gray, 1821
- Legrandia Beddome, 1883: synonym of Zeidora A. Adams, 1860
- Megatebennus Pilsbry, 1890: synonym of Fissurellidea d'Orbigny, 1839
- Nannoscutum Iredale, 1937: synonym of Scutus Montfort, 1810
- Nesta H. Adams, 1870: synonym of Zeidora A. Adams, 1860
- Notomella Cotton, 1957: synonym of Emarginula Lamarck, 1801
- Parmophoridea Wenz, 1938: synonym of Parmaphorella Strebel, 1907
- Parmophorus Blainville, 1817: synonym of Scutus Montfort, 1810
- Plagiorhytis P. Fischer, 1885: synonym of Montfortula Iredale, 1915
- Scutum P. Fischer, 1885: synonym of Scutus Montfort, 1810
- Semperia Crosse, 1867: synonym of Emarginula Lamarck, 1801
- Sipho T. Brown, 1827: synonym of Puncturella Lowe, 1827
- Siphonella Issel, 1869: synonym of Montfortista Iredale, 1929
- Subemarginula Gray, 1847: synonym of Hemitoma Swainson, 1840
- Subzeidora Iredale, 1924: synonym of Emarginula (Subzeidora) Iredale, 1924
- Tugalia Gray, 1857: synonym of Tugali Gray, 1843
- Vacerra Iredale, 1924: synonym of Puncturella Lowe, 1827
- Zidora P. Fischer, 1885: synonym of Zeidora A. Adams, 1860

== See also ==
- Keyhole limpet hemocyanin
