= Emarginella =

Scientific classification
- Kingdom: Animalia
- Phylum: Mollusca
- Class: Gastropoda
- Subclass: Vetigastropoda
- Order: Lepetellida
- Family: Fissurellidae
- Subfamily: Emarginulinae
- Genus: Emarginella; Pilsbry in Tryon, G.W. & Pilsbry, 1891

Type species
- Emarginula cuvieri Audouin, 1826

Species
- See text.

Synonyms
- Emarginella (Emarginella) Pilsbry, 1891

Genus of gastropods

Emarginella is a genus of small keyhole limpets, marine gastropod molluscs in the family Fissurellidae.

== Species ==
- Emarginella aurea Poppe & Tagaro, 2020
- Emarginella clypeus (A. Adams, 1852)
- Emarginella dharmai Poppe & Tagaro, 2020
- Emarginella eximia (Adams, 1852)
- Emarginella incisura (Adams, 1852)
- Emarginella nigromaculata (Thiele, 1915)
- Emarginella obovata (A. Adams, 1852)
- Emarginella okinawaensis Habe, 1953
- Emarginella planulata (Adams, 1852)
- Emarginella sakuraii Habe, 1963
- Emarginella sibogae (Schepman, 1908)
- Emarginella survicapi Poppe & Tagaro, 2020

Species brought into synonymy

- Emarginella biangulata (Sowerby III, 1901): synonym of Hemimarginula biangulata (Sowerby III, 1901)
- Emarginella cumingii Sowerby II, 1863: synonym of Hemitoma cumingii Sowerby II, 1863
- Emarginella flabellum Dall, 1896: synonym of Zeidora flabellum (Dall, 1896)
- Emarginella huzardii (Payraudeau, 1826): synonym of Emarginula huzardii (Payraudeau, 1826)
- Emarginella imella (Dall, 1926): synonym of Emarginula imella Dall, 1926
- Emarginella incisula (Adams, 1852): synonym of Emarginula incisula Adams, 1852
- Emarginella oppressa (Barnard, 1963): synonym of Emarginula oppressa Barnard, 1963

Taxa inquirenda

- Emarginella cuvieri (Audouin, 1826)
