= S. sinensis =

S. sinensis may refer to:

- Schizothorax sinensis, a ray-finned fish species
- Sciaromiopsis sinensis, a moss species
- Scoparia sinensis a moth species
- Scutus sinensis, a sea snail species
- Sinobdella sinensis, a spiny eel species found in China and Vietnam
- Spiranthes sinensis, the Chinese spiranthes, an orchid species occurring in much of eastern Asia, west to the Himalayas, south and east to New Zealand and north to Siberia
- Stewartia sinensis, a flowering plant species
- Susica sinensis, a moth species
- Symphoricarpos sinensis, a shrub species

== Synonyms ==
- Scilla sinensis, a synonym for Barnardia japonica, a plant species

== See also ==
- Flora Sinensis
