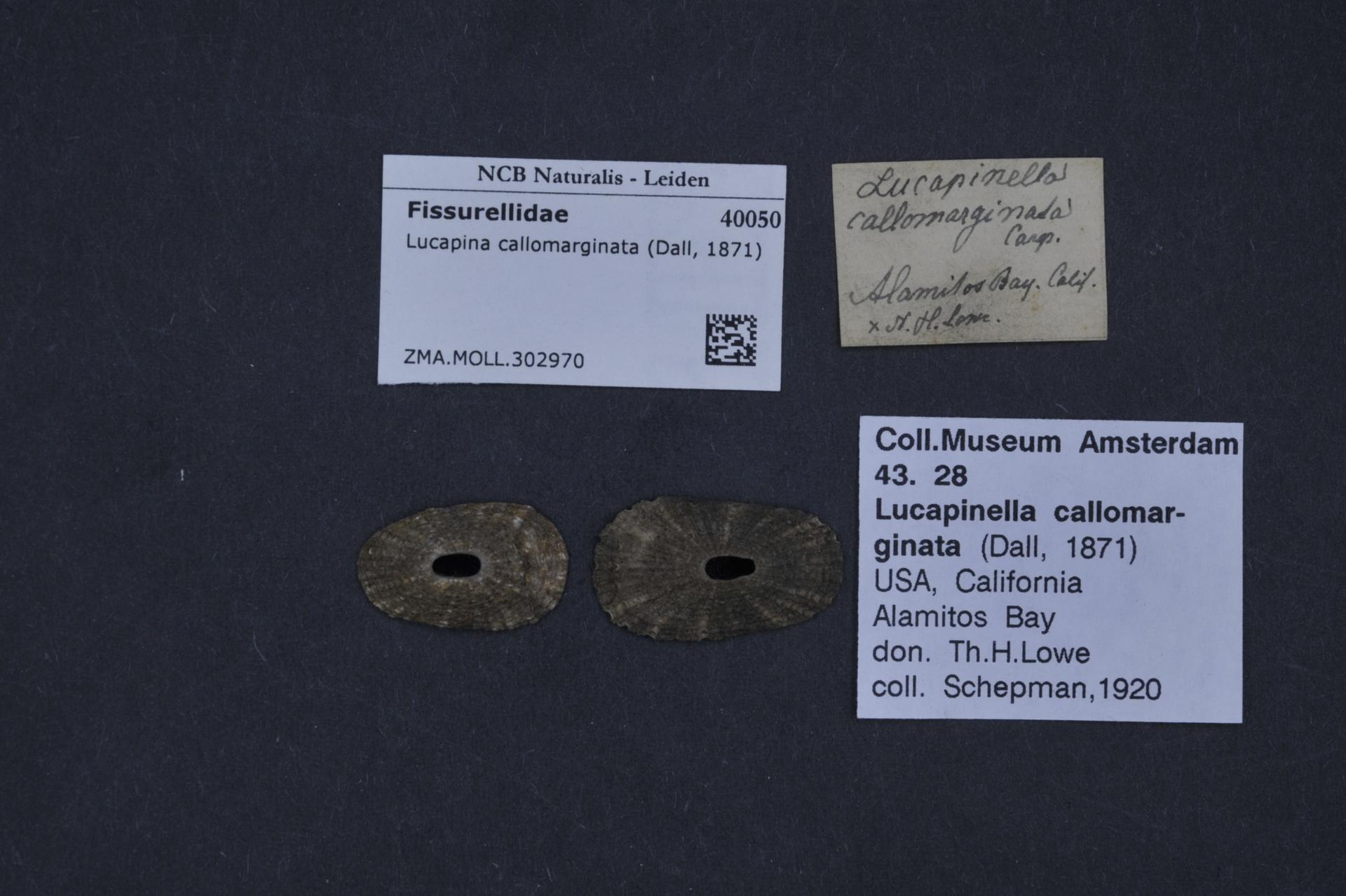

Scientific classification
- Kingdom: Animalia
- Phylum: Mollusca
- Class: Gastropoda
- Subclass: Vetigastropoda
- Order: Lepetellida
- Family: Fissurellidae
- Subfamily: Emarginulinae
- Genus: Lucapinella
- Species: L. callomarginata

Binomial name
- Lucapinella callomarginata (Dall, 1871)

Synonyms
- Clypidella callomarginata Dall, 1871

= Lucapinella callomarginata =

Species of gastropod

Lucapinella callomarginata is a species of sea snail, a marine gastropod mollusk in the family Fissurellidae, the keyhole limpets and slit limpets.
