= Scelidotoma bella =

Scientific classification
- Kingdom: Animalia
- Phylum: Mollusca
- Class: Gastropoda
- Subclass: Vetigastropoda
- Order: Lepetellida
- Family: Fissurellidae
- Subfamily: Emarginulinae
- Genus: Scelidotoma
- Species: S. bella

Binomial name
- Scelidotoma bella (Gabb, 1865)

Synonyms
- Emarginula bella Gabb, 1865

Species of gastropod

Scelidotoma bella is a species of sea snail, a marine gastropod mollusk in the family Fissurellidae, the keyhole limpets and slit limpets.
