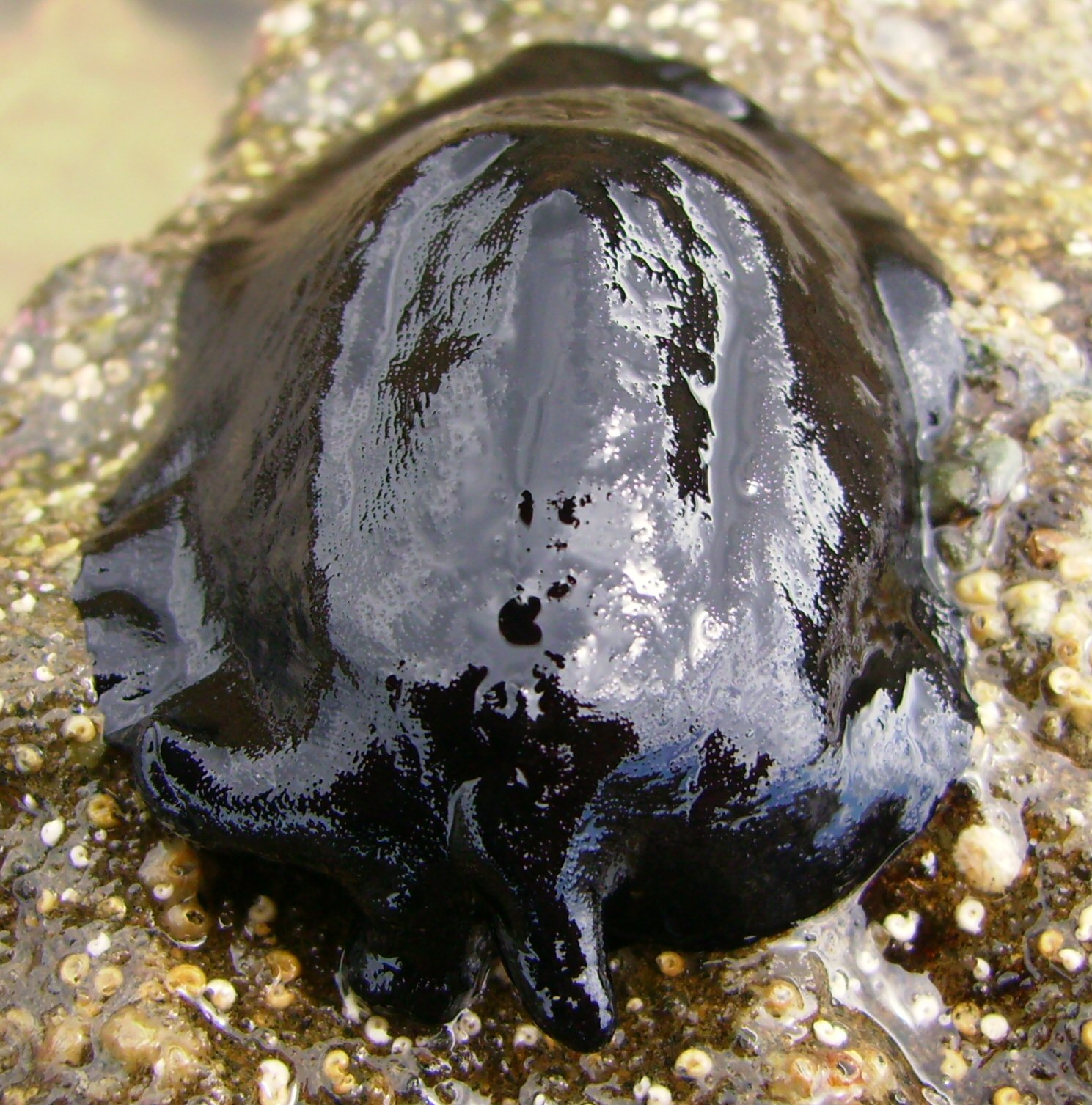
- View of the anterior end of a live animal of Scutus breviculus out of the water

Scientific classification
- Kingdom: Animalia
- Phylum: Mollusca
- Class: Gastropoda
- Subclass: Vetigastropoda
- Order: Lepetellida
- Family: Fissurellidae
- Genus: Scutus
- Species: S. breviculus

Binomial name
- Scutus breviculus Blainville, 1817

Synonyms
- S. antipodes Montfort, 1810; Powell, 1979; Spencer & Willan, 1995; S. ambiguus Suter, 1913; Bucknill, 1924

= Scutus breviculus =

Species of gastropod

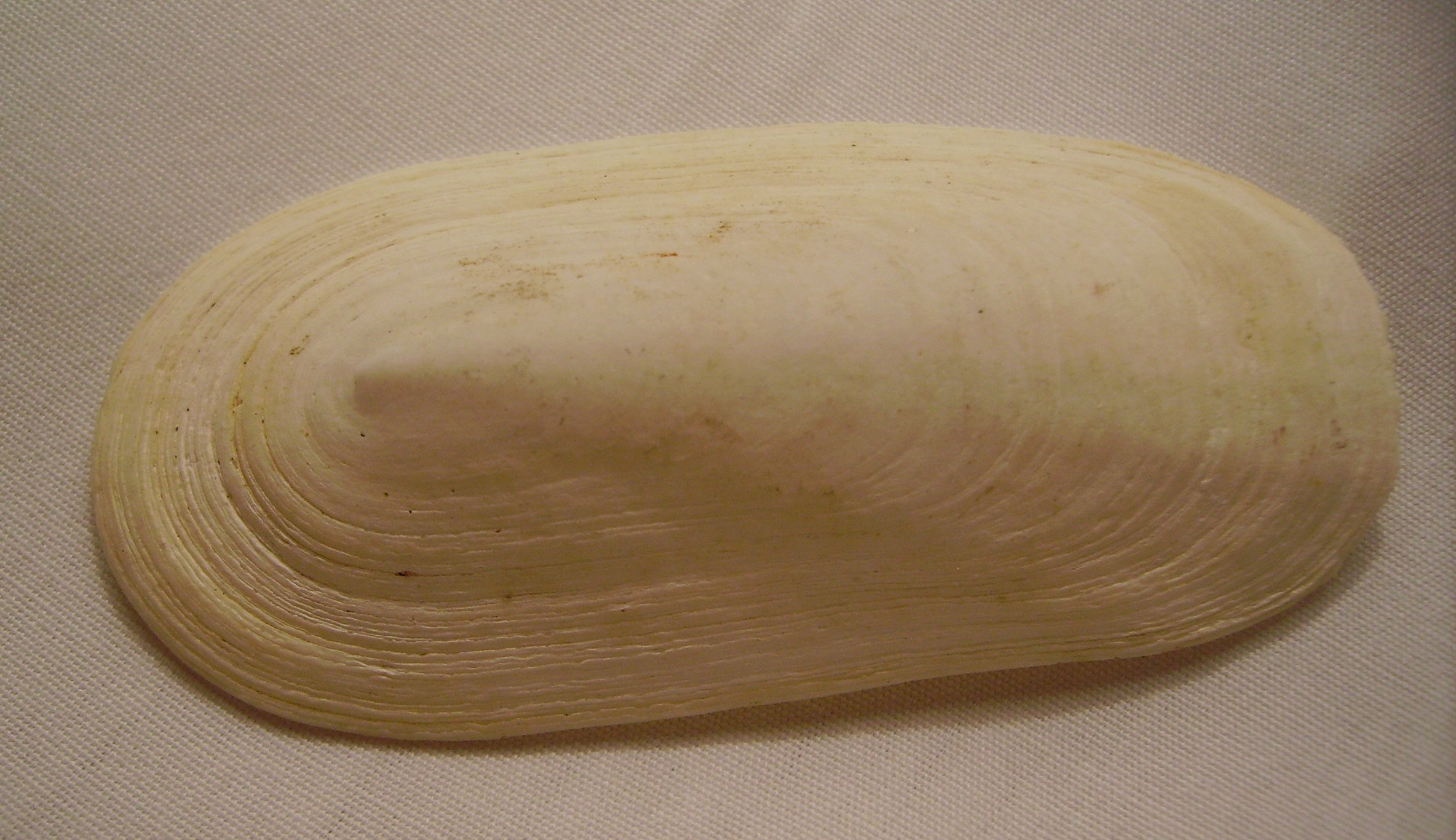
Dorsal side of the shell, anterior end towards the right

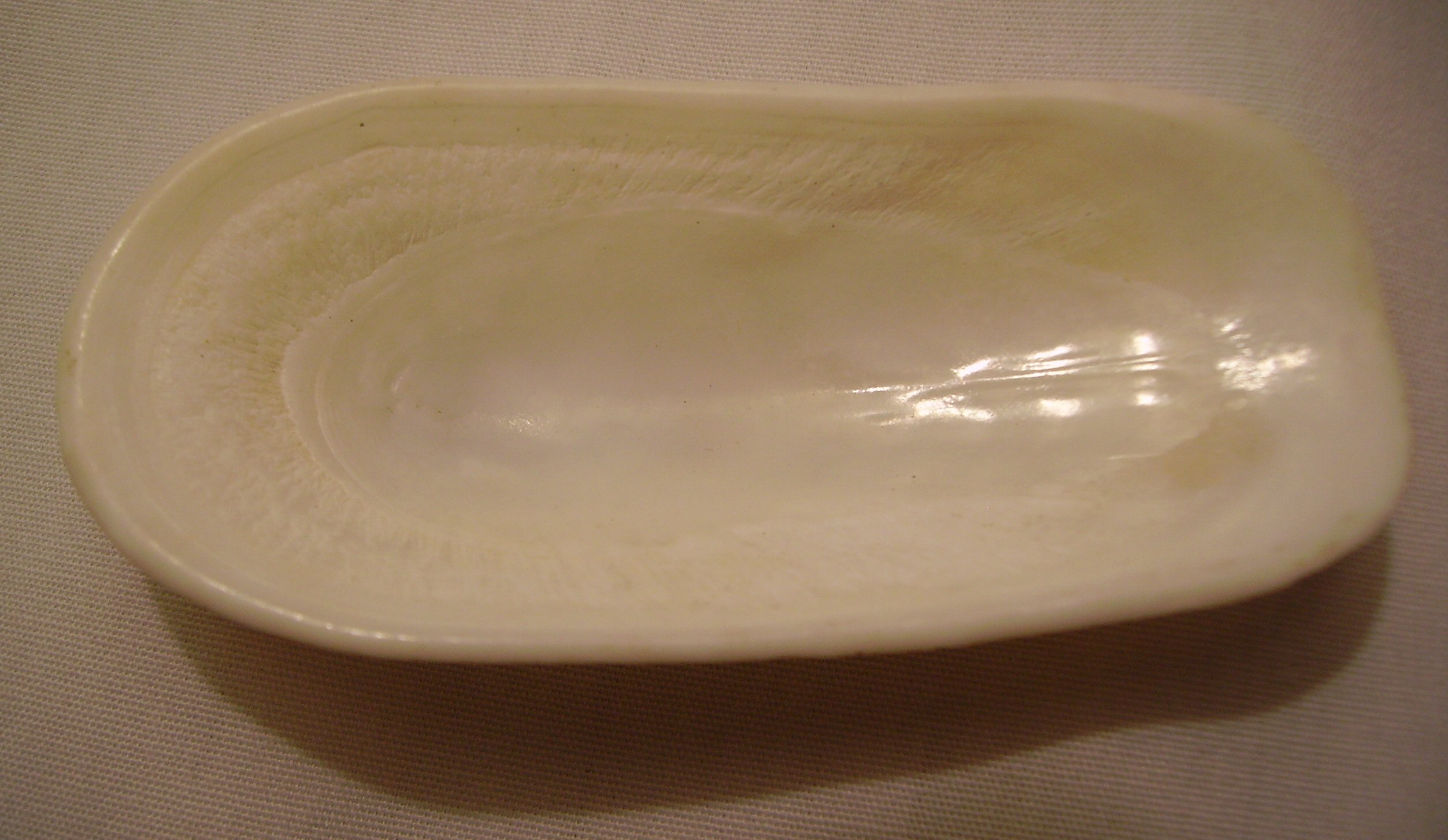
Ventral side of the shell

Scutus breviculus is a common herbivorous species of large sea snail or limpet with the common name shield shell or less commonly duck's bill limpet. It is a marine gastropod mollusc in the family Fissurellidae, the keyhole limpets and slit limpets.

== Description ==
Like most in this genus the animal has a large muscular mantle, folds of which can completely cover the whitish shell, giving it a slug-like appearance. In S. breviculus the colour is a glossy dark almost jet black, as are the thick tentacles and snout. These inhabitants of the sub-littoral fringe shun light, clinging to the undersides of large rocks and boulders in a wide range of habitats, usually down to a depth of 20 metres. At night they move around to feed, usually browsing on various alga such as Hormosira, or Ulva sp. in estuaries and harbours, often returning to the same bare scar in the rock in which they spent the previous day. This is sometimes referred to as 'homing behaviour'. An ancient food source for the Maori, who named it rori, a common name for a largish slug-like marine animal.

S. breviculus can grow up to 240mm in length and weigh over a kilogram.

== Distribution ==
This species occurs in and around New Zealand, also across Southern Australia. It is notably absent from the Chatham Islands.
