= Buchanania onchidioides =

Scientific classification
- Kingdom: Animalia
- Phylum: Mollusca
- Class: Gastropoda
- Subclass: Vetigastropoda
- Order: Lepetellida
- Family: Fissurellidae
- Subfamily: Emarginulinae
- Genus: Buchanania
- Species: B. onchidioides

Binomial name
- Buchanania onchidioides Lesson, 1830

Species of gastropod

Buchanania onchidioides is a rare species of sea snail, a marine gastropod mollusk in the family Fissurellidae, the keyhole limpets and slit limpets.

== Description ==
The shell has an elongate-ovate shape, with a large central tubercle and radiating striae on a smooth mantle. The shell grows to a size of 80 mm. The oral appendages are simple, subulate and retractile.

== Distribution ==
This marine species occurs off Argentina and Chile.
