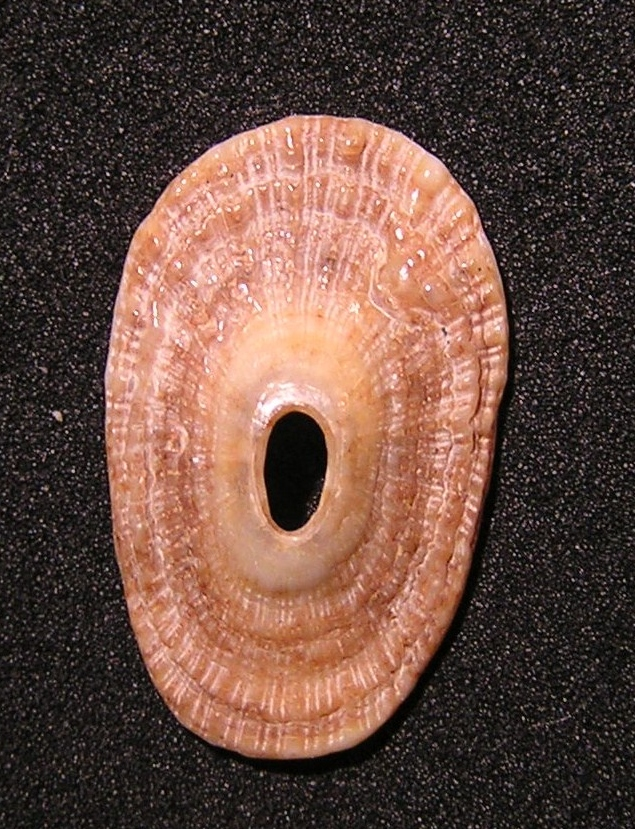
- Top view of a shell of Lucapinella henseli

Scientific classification
- Kingdom: Animalia
- Phylum: Mollusca
- Class: Gastropoda
- Subclass: Vetigastropoda
- Order: Lepetellida
- Family: Fissurellidae
- Subfamily: Emarginulinae
- Genus: Lucapinella; Pilsbry, 1890

Type species
- Lucapinella callomarginata Dall, W.H., 1871

= Lucapinella =

Genus of gastropods

Lucapinella is a genus of sea snails, marine gastropod mollusks in the family Fissurellidae, the keyhole limpets.

== Species ==
Species within the genus Lucapinella include:

- Lucapinella aequalis (Sowerby I, 1835)
- Lucapinella callomarginata (Dall, 1871)
- Lucapinella crenifera (Sowerby I, 1835)
- Lucapinella delicata Nowell-Usticke, 1969
- Lucapinella elenorae McLean, 1967
- Lucapinella henseli (Martens, 1900)
- Lucapinella limatula (Reeve, 1850)
- Lucapinella milleri Berry, 1959
- Lucapinella versluysi Dautzenberg, 1900

Species brought into synonymy

- Lucapinella callomarginata auct. non Dall, 1872: synonym of Lucapinella delicata Usticke, 1969
- Lucapinella hassleri Pérez Farfante, 1943: synonym of Lucapinella henseli (Martens, 1900)
- Lucapinella talanteia Olsson & Harbison, 1953: synonym of Lucapinella limatula (Reeve, 1850)
