= Laeviemarginula kimberi =

Scientific classification
- Kingdom: Animalia
- Phylum: Mollusca
- Class: Gastropoda
- Subclass: Vetigastropoda
- Order: Lepetellida
- Family: Fissurellidae
- Subfamily: Emarginulinae
- Genus: Laeviemarginula
- Species: L. kimberi

Binomial name
- Laeviemarginula kimberi (Cotton, 1930)

Synonyms
- Emarginula kimberti Cotton, 1930; Laeviemarginula kimberti (Cotton, 1930); Laeviemarginula membranacea Habe, 1953

Species of gastropod

Laeviemarginula kimberi is a species of sea snail, a marine gastropod mollusk in the family Fissurellidae, the keyhole limpets and slit limpets.
