= Lucapinella aequalis =

Scientific classification
- Kingdom: Animalia
- Phylum: Mollusca
- Class: Gastropoda
- Subclass: Vetigastropoda
- Order: Lepetellida
- Family: Fissurellidae
- Subfamily: Emarginulinae
- Genus: Lucapinella
- Species: L. aequalis

Binomial name
- Lucapinella aequalis (Sowerby I, 1834)

Synonyms
- Fissurella aequalis Sowerby I, 1834

Species of gastropod

Lucapinella aequalis is a species of sea snail, a marine gastropod mollusk in the family Fissurellidae, the keyhole limpets and slit limpets.
