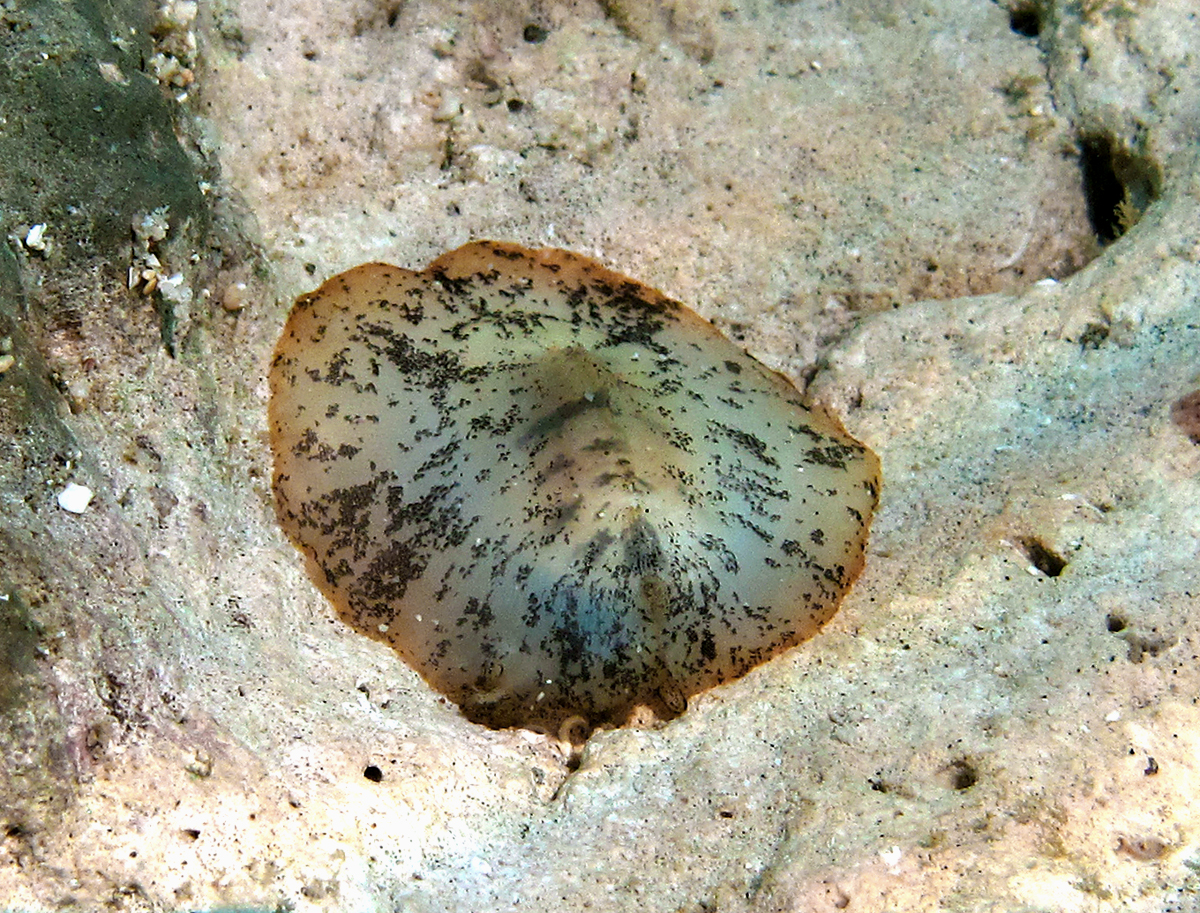
- a live Scutus sinensis
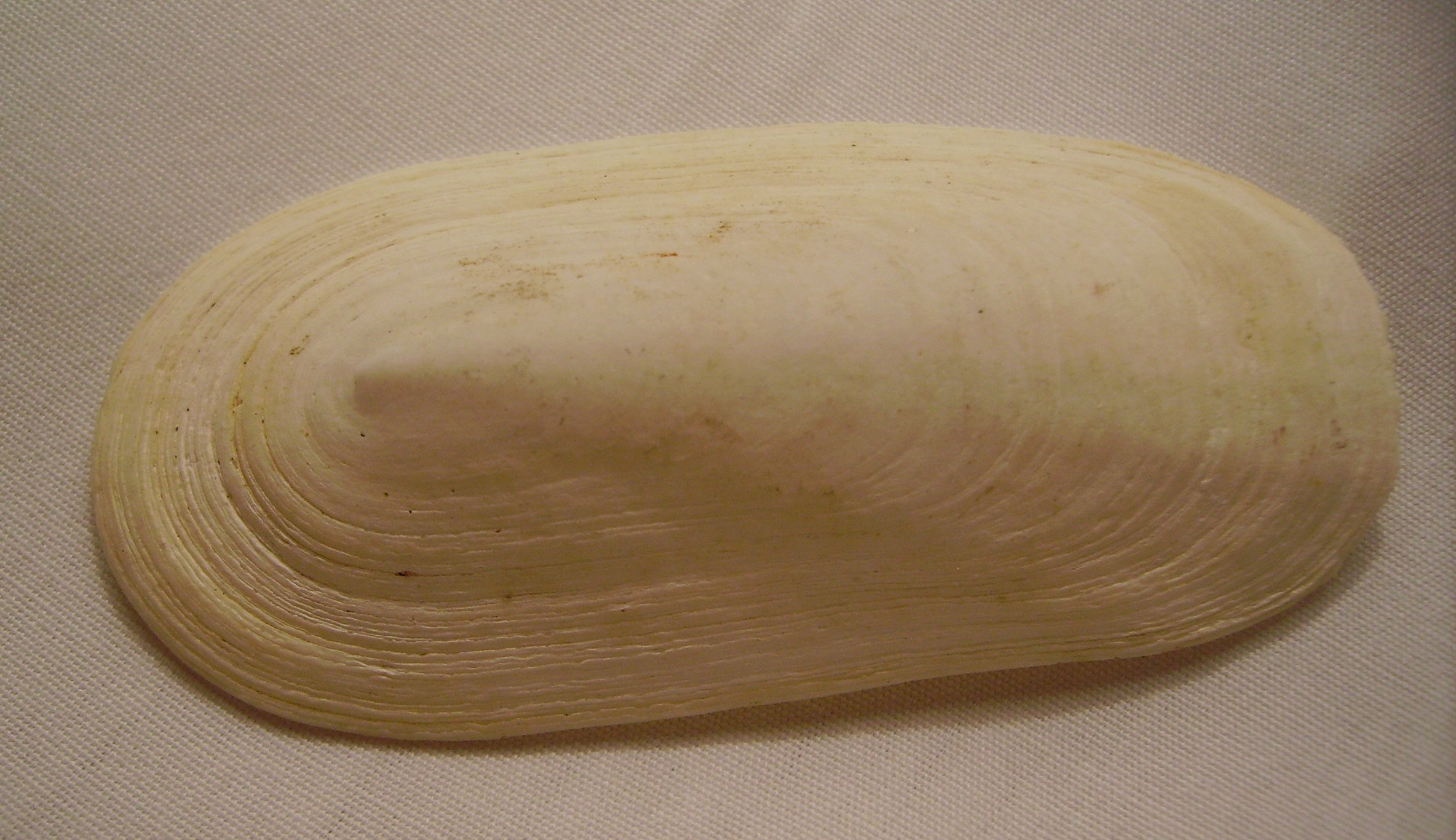
- Dorsal view of a shell of Scutus breviculus

Scientific classification
- Kingdom: Animalia
- Phylum: Mollusca
- Class: Gastropoda
- Subclass: Vetigastropoda
- Order: Lepetellida
- Family: Fissurellidae
- Subfamily: Emarginulinae
- Genus: Scutus; Blainville, 1817

Type species
- Scutus antipodes Montfort, 1810

Synonyms
- Aviscutum Iredale, 1940; Nannoscutum Iredale, 1937; Parmophorus Blainville, 1817 (unnecessary substitute name for Scutus); Scutum P. Fischer, 1885 (invalid: unjustified emendation of Scutus); Scutus (Aviscutum) Iredale, 1940

= Scutus =

Genus of gastropods

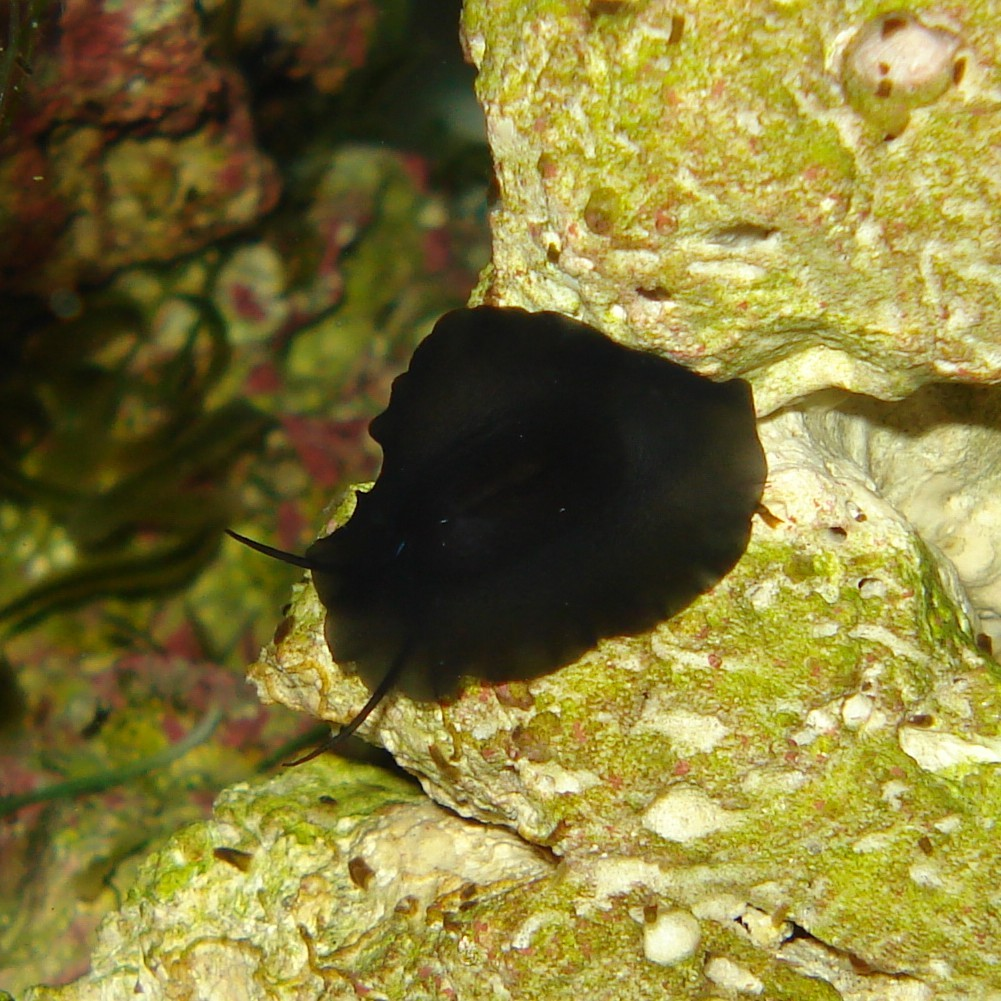
A live individual

Scutus is a genus of large sea snails or limpets with the common name "shield shells". These are marine gastropod molluscs in the family Fissurellidae, the keyhole limpets and slit limpets.

Both the common name and the scientific name reflect the fact that the shells of species in this genus resemble a Roman shield.

== Description ==
The animal itself has a large black mantle which usually completely covers the shell, giving the animal a superficially slug-like appearance.

== Species ==
Species within the genus Scutus include:

- Scutus anatinus (Donovan, 1820)
- Scutus antipodes Montfort, 1810 -
- † Scutus bellardii Michelotti, 1847
- Scutus breviculus Blainville, 1817
- Scutus emarginatus (Philippi, 1851)
- Scutus forsythi (Iredale, 1937)
- Scutus howensis Iredale, 1940
- † Scutus mirus Gard, 2020
- Scutus olunguis Iredale, 1940
- † Scutus petrafixus Finlay, 1930
- † Scutus pliopunctatus Lozano-Francisco & Vera-Peláez, 2002
- Scutus rueppelli (Philippi, 1851)
- Scutus scapha (J.F. Gmelin, 1791)
- Scutus sinensis (Blainville, 1825)
- Scutus unguis (Linnaeus, 1758)
- Scutus virgo Habe, 1951

Species brought into synonymy

- Scutus ambiguus (Dillwyn, 1817): synonym of Scutus anatinus (Donovan, 1820)
- Scutus angustatus A. Adams, 1851: synonym of Scutus unguis (Linnaeus, 1758)
- Scutus astrolabeus Hedley, 1917: synonym of Scutus anatinus (Donovan, 1820)
- Scutus australis (Lamarck, 1822): synonym of Scutus anatinus (Donovan, 1820)
- Scutus corrugatus (Reeve, 1842): synonym of Scutus unguis (Linnaeus, 1758)
- Scutus elongatus (Blainville, 1817): synonym of Scutus antipodes Montfort, 1810
- Scutus granulatus (Blainville, 1819): synonym of Scutus unguis (Linnaeus, 1758)
- Scutus parunguis Iredale, 1940: synonym of Scutus unguis (Linnaeus, 1758)
- Scutus savignyi Pallary, 1926: synonym of Scutus rueppeli (Philippi, 1851)
- Scutus veitchi (Cotton, 1953): synonym of Scutus antipodes Montfort, 1810
