= Emarginella sibogae =

Scientific classification
- Kingdom: Animalia
- Phylum: Mollusca
- Class: Gastropoda
- Subclass: Vetigastropoda
- Order: Lepetellida
- Family: Fissurellidae
- Subfamily: Emarginulinae
- Genus: Emarginella
- Species: E. sibogae

Binomial name
- Emarginella sibogae (Schepman, 1908)

Synonyms
- Emarginella (Emarginella) sibogae (Schepman, 1908); Emarginula (Emarginella) sibogae (Schepman, 1908); Emarginula sibogae Schepman, 1908

Species of gastropod

Emarginella sibogae is a species of sea snail, a marine gastropod mollusk in the family Fissurellidae, the keyhole limpets and slit limpets.
