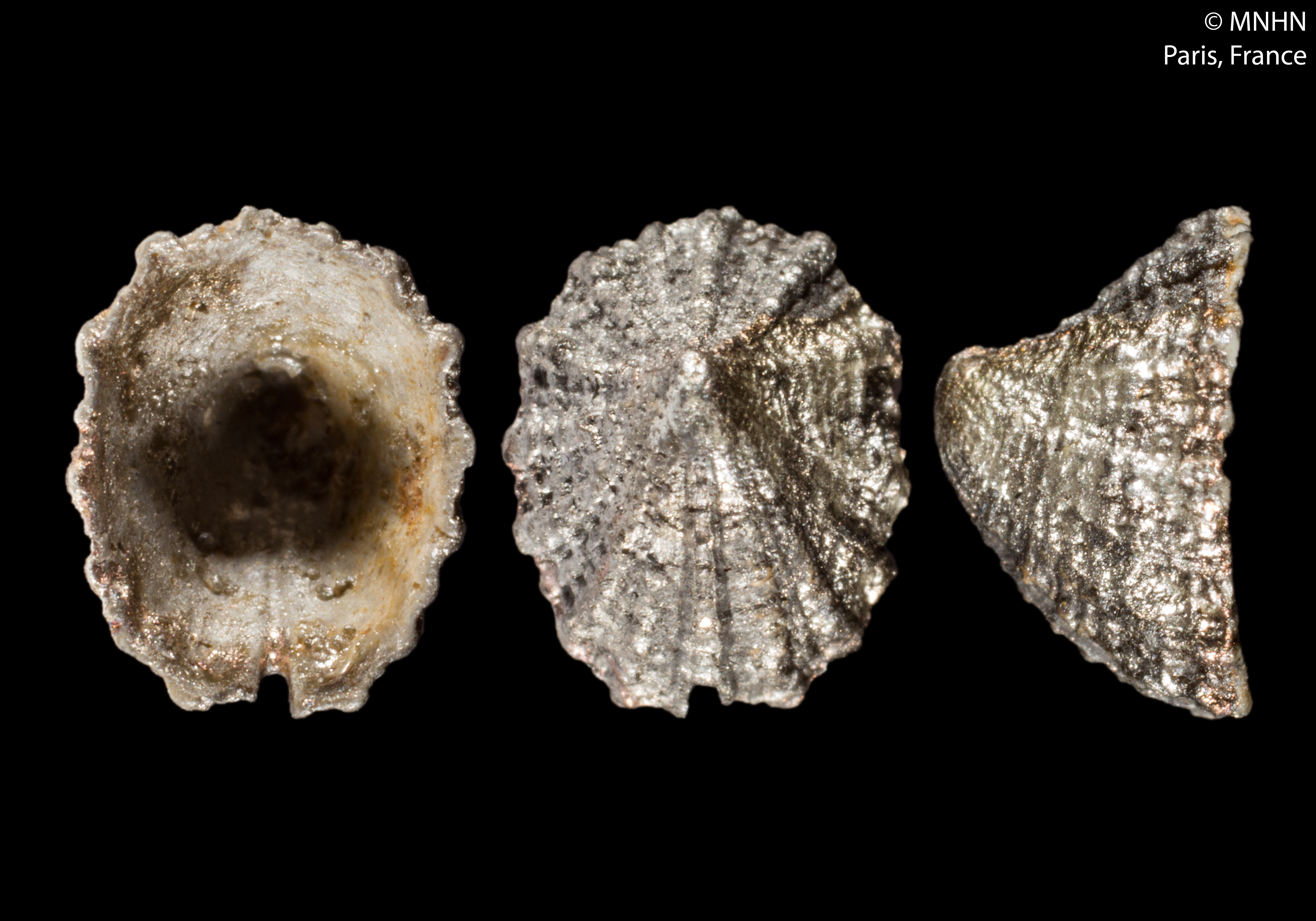
- Shell of Agariste phrygium (specimen at MNHN, Paris)

Scientific classification
- Kingdom: Animalia
- Phylum: Mollusca
- Class: Gastropoda
- Subclass: Vetigastropoda
- Order: Lepetellida
- Family: Fissurellidae
- Subfamily: Emarginulinae
- Genus: Agariste
- Species: A. phrygium

Binomial name
- Agariste phrygium (Herbert & Kilburn, 1986)

Synonyms
- Emarginula phrygium Herbert & Kilburn, 1986 (original combination)

= Agariste phrygium =

Species of gastropod

Agariste phrygium is a species of sea snail, a marine gastropod mollusk in the family Fissurellidae, the keyhole limpets and slit limpets.

== Description ==
The height of the shell attains 8.3 mm, its base measures 9.0 mm x 6.1 mm.

== Distribution ==
This marine species occurs in the Indian Ocean off KwaZulu-Natal, Walters Shoal and the eastern seaboard of South Africa at depths between 420 m and 599 m.
