= Lucapinella elenorae =

Scientific classification
- Kingdom: Animalia
- Phylum: Mollusca
- Class: Gastropoda
- Subclass: Vetigastropoda
- Order: Lepetellida
- Family: Fissurellidae
- Subfamily: Emarginulinae
- Genus: Lucapinella
- Species: L. elenorae

Binomial name
- Lucapinella elenorae McLean, 1967

Species of gastropod

Lucapinella elenorae is a species of sea snail, a marine gastropod mollusk in the family Fissurellidae, the keyhole limpets and slit limpets.
