= Parmaphorella antarctica =

Scientific classification
- Kingdom: Animalia
- Phylum: Mollusca
- Class: Gastropoda
- Subclass: Vetigastropoda
- Order: Lepetellida
- Family: Fissurellidae
- Subfamily: Emarginulinae
- Genus: Parmaphorella
- Species: P. antarctica

Binomial name
- Parmaphorella antarctica (Strebel, 1907)

Synonyms
- Parmophoridea antarctica (Strebel, 1907)

Species of gastropod

Parmaphorella antarctica is a species of sea snail, a marine gastropod mollusk in the family Fissurellidae, the keyhole limpets and slit limpets.
