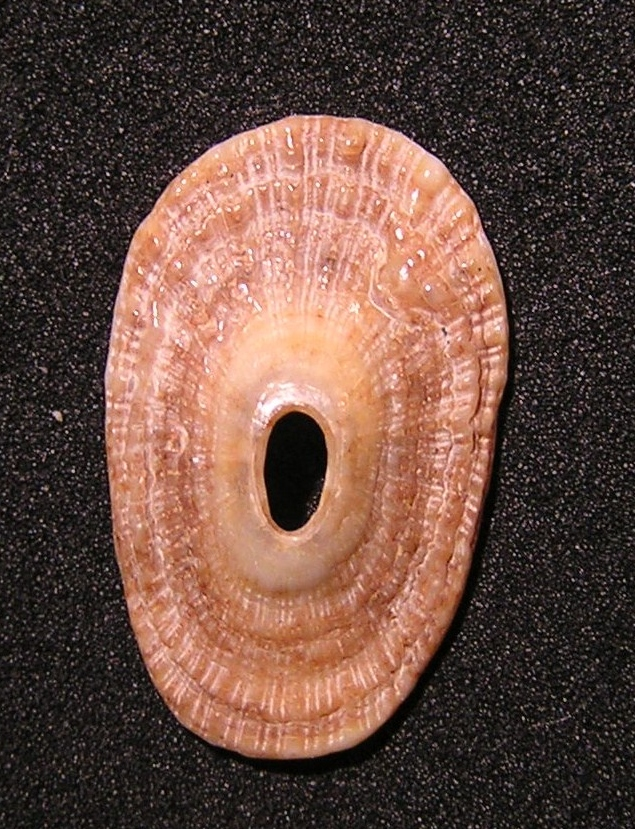
- Top view of a shell of Lucapinella henseli

Scientific classification
- Kingdom: Animalia
- Phylum: Mollusca
- Class: Gastropoda
- Subclass: Vetigastropoda
- Order: Lepetellida
- Family: Fissurellidae
- Subfamily: Emarginulinae
- Genus: Lucapinella
- Species: L. henseli

Binomial name
- Lucapinella henseli (Martens, 1900)

Synonyms
- Fissurella henseli Martens, 1900; Lucapinella hassleri Pérez Farfante, 1943; Lucapinella limatula hassleri Farfante, I. Pérez, 1943

= Lucapinella henseli =

Species of gastropod

Lucapinella henseli is a species of sea snail, a marine gastropod mollusk in the family Fissurellidae, the keyhole limpets and slit limpets.

== Description ==
The size of the shell varies between 9 mm and 30 mm.

== Distribution ==
This species occurs in the Atlantic Ocean from Brazil to the Straits of Magellan.
