= Lucapinella delicata =

Scientific classification
- Kingdom: Animalia
- Phylum: Mollusca
- Class: Gastropoda
- Subclass: Vetigastropoda
- Order: Lepetellida
- Family: Fissurellidae
- Subfamily: Emarginulinae
- Genus: Lucapinella
- Species: L. delicata

Binomial name
- Lucapinella delicata Nowell-Usticke, 1969

Synonyms
- Lucapinella callomarginata auct. non Dall, 1872

Species of gastropod

Lucapinella delicata is a species of sea snail, a marine gastropod mollusk in the family Fissurellidae, the keyhole limpets and slit limpets.
