= Scutus rueppelli =

Scientific classification
- Kingdom: Animalia
- Phylum: Mollusca
- Class: Gastropoda
- Subclass: Vetigastropoda
- Order: Lepetellida
- Family: Fissurellidae
- Subfamily: Emarginulinae
- Genus: Scutus
- Species: S. rueppelli

Binomial name
- Scutus rueppelli (Philippi, 1851)

Synonyms
- Parmophorus rueppeli Philippi, 1851; Scutus savignyi Pallary, 1926; Scutus unguis (Linnaeus, 1758)

Species of gastropod

Scutus rueppelli is a species of sea snail, a marine gastropod mollusk in the family Fissurellidae, the keyhole limpets and slit limpets.

Original spelling Rüppeli, with reference to "Rüppel et Leuck. Atlas 1828", thus indicating that the specific epithet is named after Eduard Rüppell (1794-1884).

== Distribution ==
This marine species occurs in the Red Sea.
