= Scutus emarginatus =

Scientific classification
- Kingdom: Animalia
- Phylum: Mollusca
- Class: Gastropoda
- Subclass: Vetigastropoda
- Order: Lepetellida
- Family: Fissurellidae
- Subfamily: Emarginulinae
- Genus: Scutus
- Species: S. emarginatus

Binomial name
- Scutus emarginatus (Philippi, 1851)

Synonyms
- Parmophorus emarginatus Philippi, 1851

Species of gastropod

Scutus emarginatus is a species of sea snail, a marine gastropod mollusk in the family Fissurellidae, the keyhole limpets and slit limpets.
