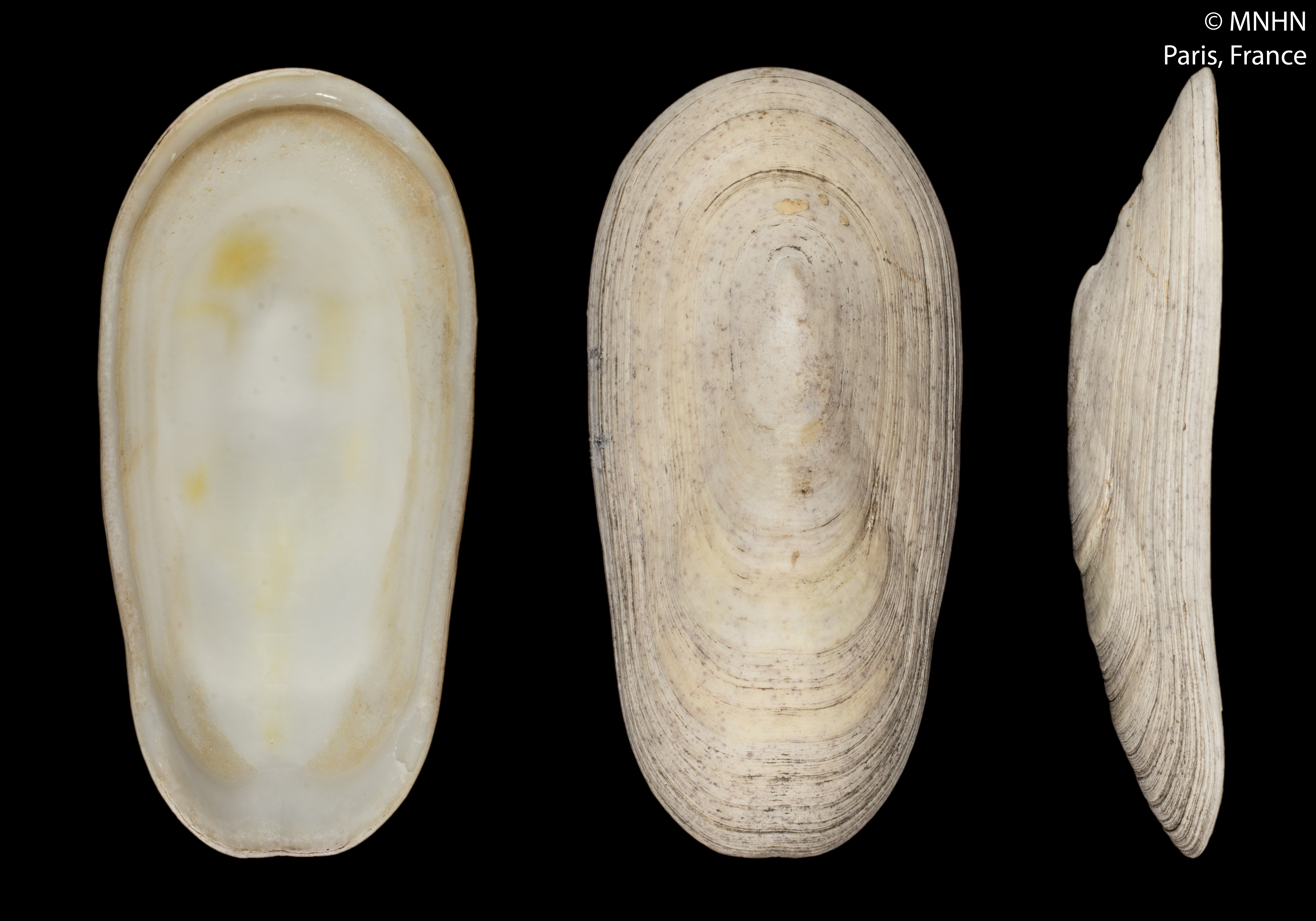
- Shell of Scutus anatinus (syntype at MNHN, Paris)

Scientific classification
- Kingdom: Animalia
- Phylum: Mollusca
- Class: Gastropoda
- Subclass: Vetigastropoda
- Order: Lepetellida
- Family: Fissurellidae
- Subfamily: Emarginulinae
- Genus: Scutus
- Species: S. anatinus

Binomial name
- Scutus anatinus (Donovan, 1820)

Synonyms
- Parmophorus convexus Quoy & Gaimard, 1834; Patella ambigua Dillwyn, 1817; Patella anatina Donovan, 1820; Scutus ambiguus (Dillwyn, 1817); Scutus astrolabeus Hedley, 1917; Scutus australis (Lamarck, 1822)

= Scutus anatinus =

Species of gastropod

Scutus anatinus is a species of sea snail or limpet, a marine gastropod mollusk in the family Fissurellidae, the keyhole limpets and slit limpets.

== Description ==
The length of the shell attains 73.7 mm.

== Distribution ==
This marine species occurs off Australia.
