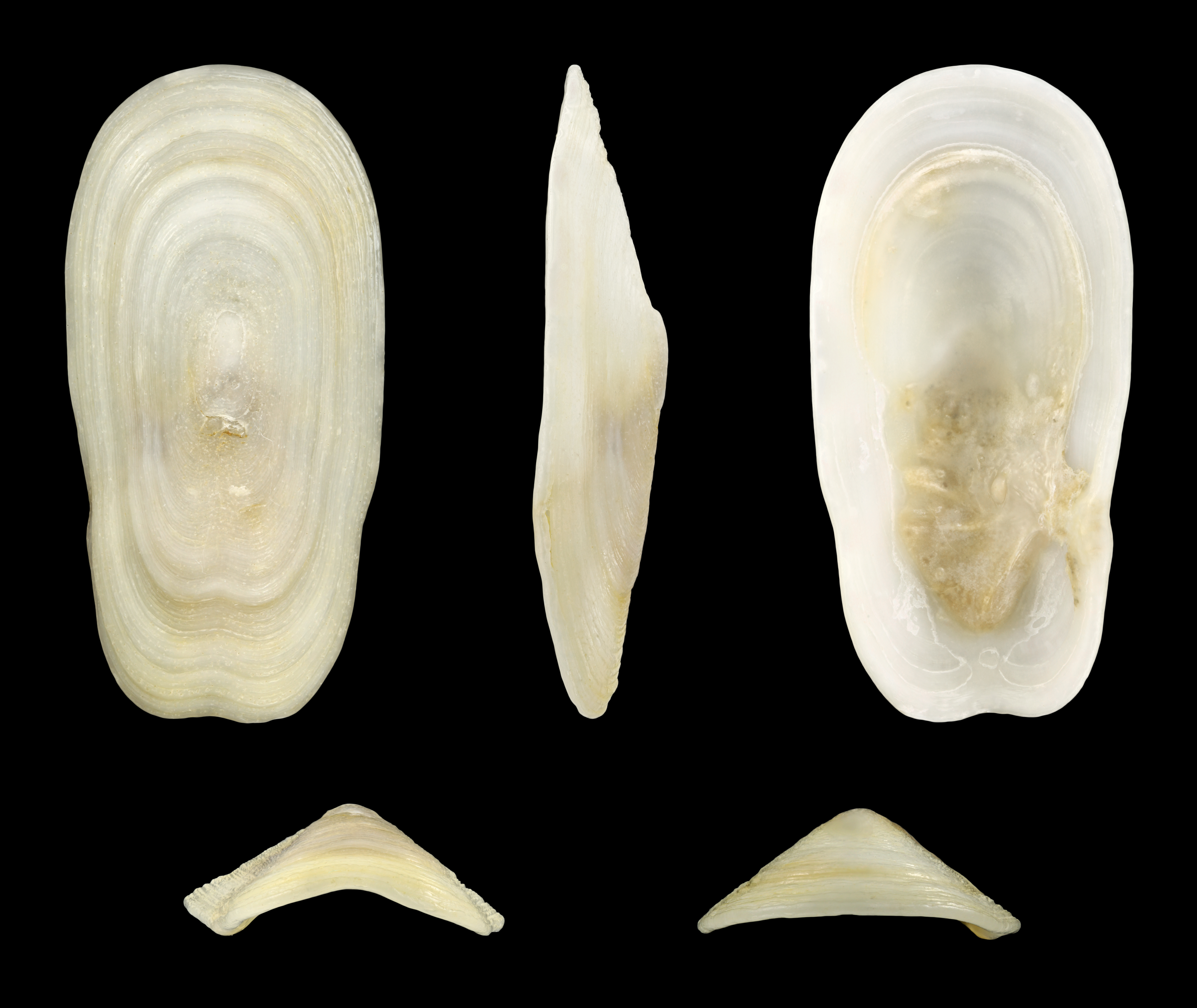

Scientific classification
- Kingdom: Animalia
- Phylum: Mollusca
- Class: Gastropoda
- Subclass: Vetigastropoda
- Order: Lepetellida
- Family: Fissurellidae
- Subfamily: Emarginulinae
- Genus: Scutus
- Species: S. unguis

Binomial name
- Scutus unguis (Linnaeus, 1758)

Synonyms
- Parmophorus corrugatus Reeve, 1842; Parmophorus elegans Gray, 1825 ·; Parmophorus imbricatus Quoy & Gaimard, 1834; Patella unguis Linnaeus, 1758 (original combination); Scutus (Aviscutum) unguis (Linnaeus, 1758) · alternate representation; Scutus angustatus A. Adams, 1851; Scutus corrugatus (Reeve, 1842); Scutus granulatus (Blainville, 1819); Scutus parunguis Iredale, 1940 ·

= Scutus unguis =

Species of gastropod

Scutus unguis, common name the northern duck's bill, is a species of large sea snail or limpet, a marine gastropod mollusk in the family Fissurellidae, the keyhole limpets and slit limpets.

== Description ==
The length of the shell attains 25.7 mm.

White shell, up to 6 cm long, distinctive by absence of slit or apical hole, though there is a small indent in the posterior margin. The mantle has purple brown markings on a cream background. Habitat: shallow-water rocks and coral. (Richmond, 1997)

== Distribution ==
This marine species occurs in the Indo-west Pacific, from the Red Sea to the Solomon Islands; also off Papua New Guinea and Australia (Northern Territory, Queensland, Western Australia).
