= Lucapinella crenifera =

Scientific classification
- Kingdom: Animalia
- Phylum: Mollusca
- Class: Gastropoda
- Subclass: Vetigastropoda
- Order: Lepetellida
- Family: Fissurellidae
- Subfamily: Emarginulinae
- Genus: Lucapinella
- Species: L. crenifera

Binomial name
- Lucapinella crenifera (Sowerby I, 1835)

Species of gastropod

Lucapinella crenifera is a species of sea snail, a marine gastropod mollusk in the family Fissurellidae, the keyhole limpets and slit limpets.
