= Stromboli beebei =

Scientific classification
- Kingdom: Animalia
- Phylum: Mollusca
- Class: Gastropoda
- Subclass: Vetigastropoda
- Order: Lepetellida
- Family: Fissurellidae
- Subfamily: Emarginulinae
- Genus: Stromboli
- Species: S. beebei

Binomial name
- Stromboli beebei (Hertlein & Strong, 1951)

Species of gastropod

Stromboli beebei is a species of sea snail, a marine gastropod mollusk in the family Fissurellidae, the keyhole limpets and slit limpets.

== Description ==
The shell grows to a size of 40 mm.

== Distribution ==
This species occurs in the southern Gulf of California, West Mexico.
