= Scutus forsythi =

Scientific classification
- Kingdom: Animalia
- Phylum: Mollusca
- Class: Gastropoda
- Subclass: Vetigastropoda
- Order: Lepetellida
- Family: Fissurellidae
- Subfamily: Emarginulinae
- Genus: Scutus
- Species: S. forsythi

Binomial name
- Scutus forsythi (Iredale, 1937)

Synonyms
- Nannoscutum forsythi Iredale, 1937

Species of gastropod

Scutus forsythi is a species of sea snail, a marine gastropod mollusk in the family Fissurellidae, the keyhole limpets and slit limpets.
