= Parmaphorella melvilli =

Scientific classification
- Kingdom: Animalia
- Phylum: Mollusca
- Class: Gastropoda
- Subclass: Vetigastropoda
- Order: Lepetellida
- Family: Fissurellidae
- Genus: Parmaphorella
- Species: P. melvilli

Binomial name
- Parmaphorella melvilli (Thiele, 1912)

Synonyms
- Parmophoridea melvilli (Thiele, 1912); Tugali antarctica Melvill & R. Standen, 1907 (preoccupied name)

Species of gastropod

Parmaphorella melvilli is a species of sea snail, a marine gastropod mollusk in the family Fissurellidae, the keyhole limpets.
