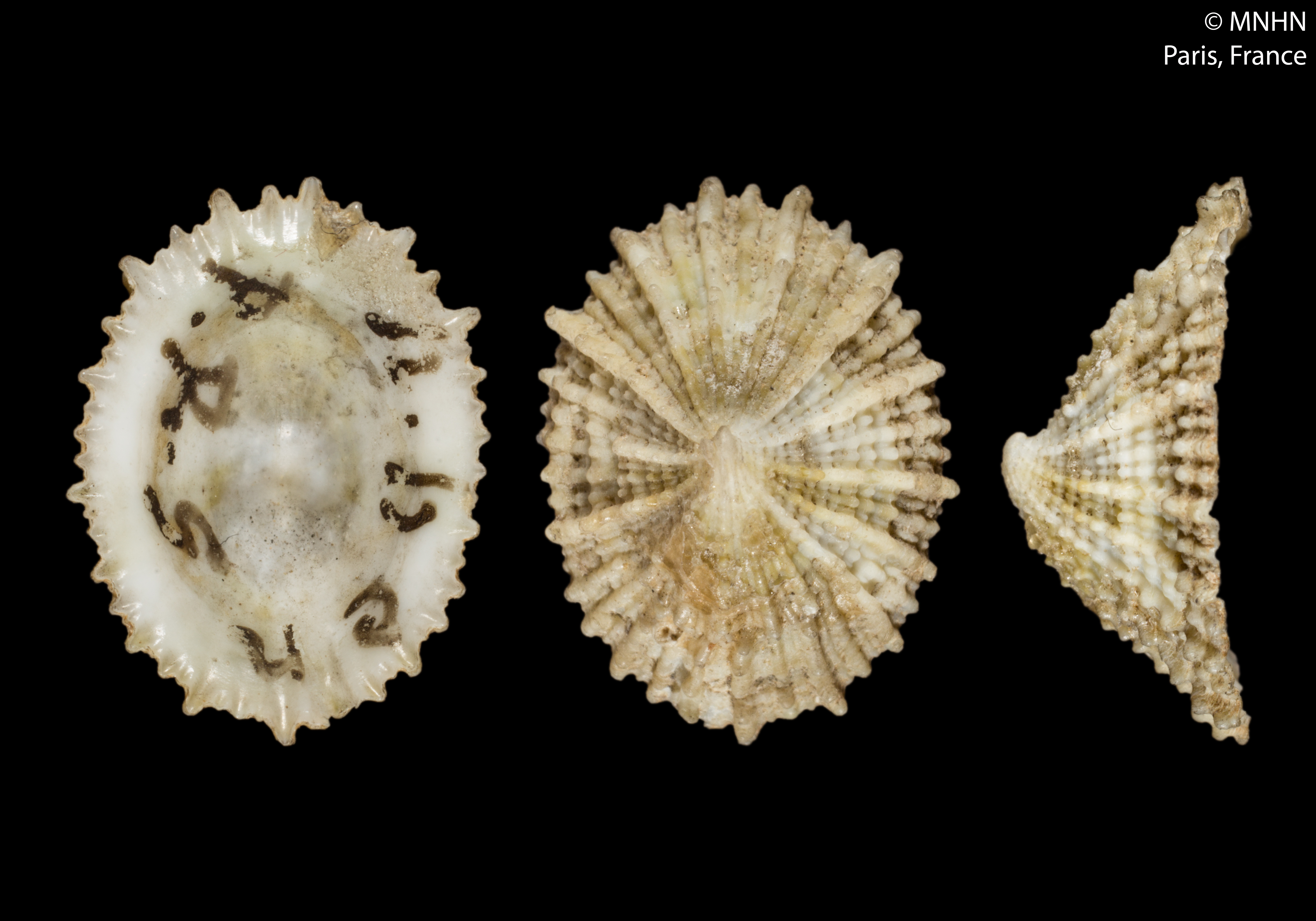
- Shell of Montfortula rugosa

Scientific classification
- Kingdom: Animalia
- Phylum: Mollusca
- Class: Gastropoda
- Subclass: Vetigastropoda
- Order: Lepetellida
- Superfamily: Fissurelloidea
- Family: Fissurellidae
- Subfamily: Hemitominae
- Genus: Montfortula; Iredale, 1915

Type species
- Emarginula rugosa Quoy & Gaimard, 1834

Synonyms
- Clypidina (Montfortula) Iredale, 1915 ·; Plagiorhytis Fischer, 1885 non Chaudoir, 1848; Subemarginula (Plagiorhytis) P. Fischer, 1885; Variegemarginula J. H. McLean, 2011

= Montfortula =

Genus of gastropods

Montfortula is a genus of keyhole limpets, marine gastropod molluscs in the subfamily Emarginulinae of the family Fissurellidae.

== Species ==
As of 2024, species within the genus Montfortula include:

- † Montfortula aperturata Chapman & Gabriel, 1923
- Montfortula brevirimata (Deshayes, 1862)
- † Montfortula cainozoica Chapman & Gabriel, 1923
- Montfortula chathamensis Finlay, 1928
- † Montfortula fenestrata (Deshayes, 1861)
- Montfortula fujitai (Habe, 1953)
- † Montfortula gemmata Chapman & Gabriel, 1923
- †Montfortula kaawaensis (Bartrum, 1919)
- † Montfortula occlusa (Tate, 1898)
- † Montfortula polygonalis (Cossmann, 1923)
- † Montfortula ponderosa Chapman & Gabriel, 1923
- Montfortula punctata (A. Adams, 1852)
- † Montfortula radiola (Lamarck, 1803)
- Montfortula rugosa (Quoy & Gaimard, 1834)
- † Montfortula squamoidea Chapman & Gabriel, 1923
- † Montfortula thuriensis (Chelot, 1886)
- Montfortula variegata (A. Adams, 1852)

Species brought into synonymy

- Montfortula lyallensis Mestayer, 1928: synonym of Montfortula rugosa (Quoy & Gaimard, 1834)
- Montfortula picta (Dunker, 1860): synonym of Montfortia picta (Dunker, 1860)
- Montfortula pulchra (Adams, 1852): synonym of Montfortia pulchra (A. Adams, 1852)
