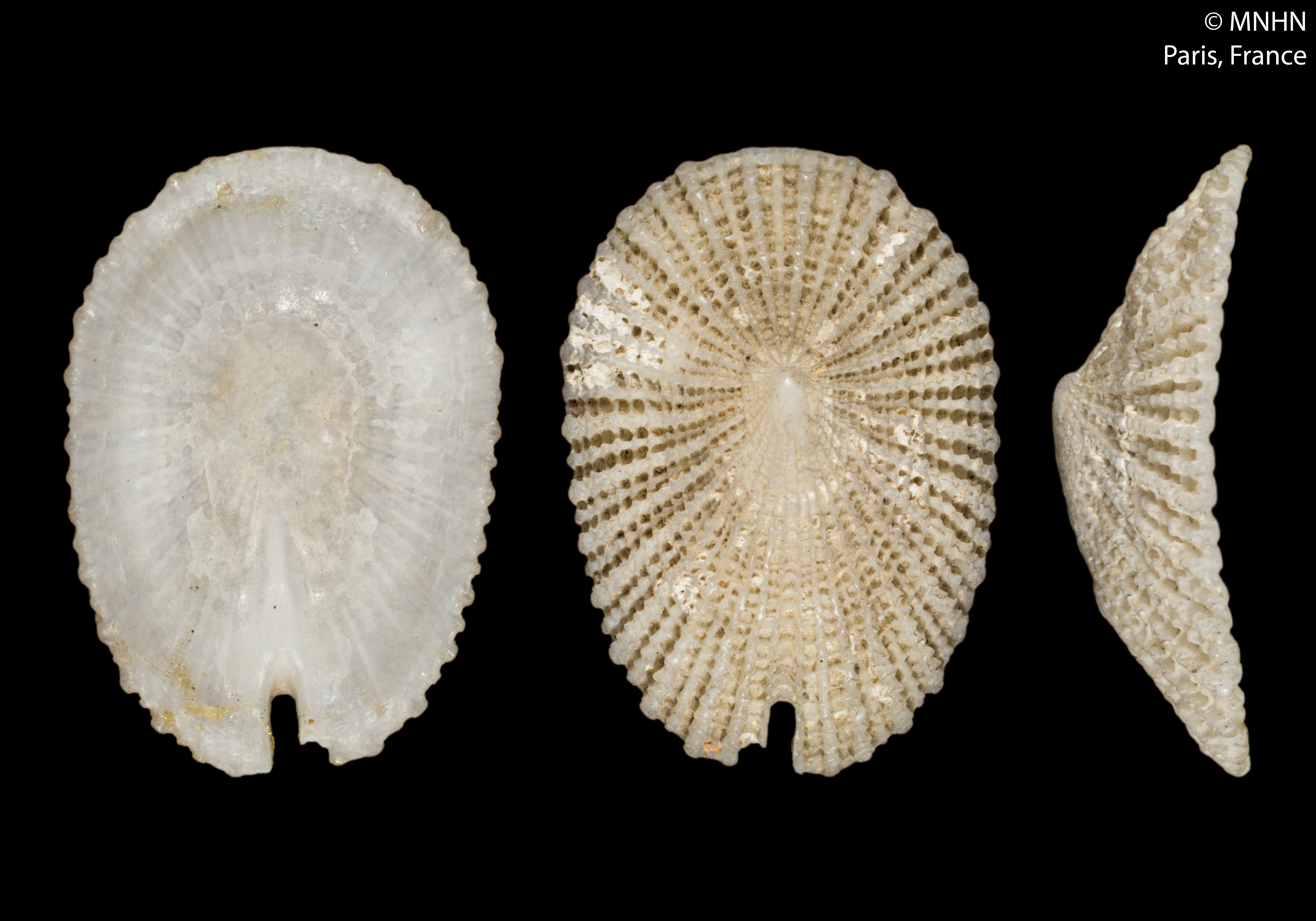
- Shell of Emarginula huzardii (syntype at MNHN, Paris)

Scientific classification
- Kingdom: Animalia
- Phylum: Mollusca
- Class: Gastropoda
- Subclass: Vetigastropoda
- Order: Lepetellida
- Family: Fissurellidae
- Genus: Emarginula
- Species: E. huzardii

Binomial name
- Emarginula huzardii (Payraudeau, 1826)

Synonyms
- Emarginella huzardii (Payraudeau, 1826); Emarginula crebrisculpta Coen, 1939; Emarginula cusmichiana Brusina, 1866; Emarginula depressa Risso, 1826; Emarginula huzardii var. intermedia Requien, 1848; Emarginula huzardii var. major Monterosato, 1878; Emarginula papillosa Risso, 1826; Patella scissa Salis Marschlins, 1793 (dubious synonym)

= Emarginula huzardii =

Species of gastropod

Emarginula huzardii is a species of sea snail, a marine gastropod mollusk in the family Fissurellidae, the keyhole limpets.

== Description ==
Emarginula huzardii is a small keyhole limpet, with a depressed, oblong-ovate shell no longer than 16.8 mm, the breadth 8 mm and the height 2.5 to 4 mm. The minute apex is slightly recurved. The straight posterior slope is half the length of the convex front slope. The exhalant slit is narrow, about one-fifth to one-sixth the length of the shell. A narrow callus extends from the apex to the slit. The surface is reticulated with 25 - 28 alternately larger and smaller radiating riblets and delicately raised concentric laminae. These form compressed scales on the ribs and cut the interstices into pits. The side margin is finely denticulated and arched so that the shell rests upon the ends only.

== Distribution ==
This species has only been found in the Mediterranean Sea and the Adriatic Sea, living on infralittoral hard substrates.
