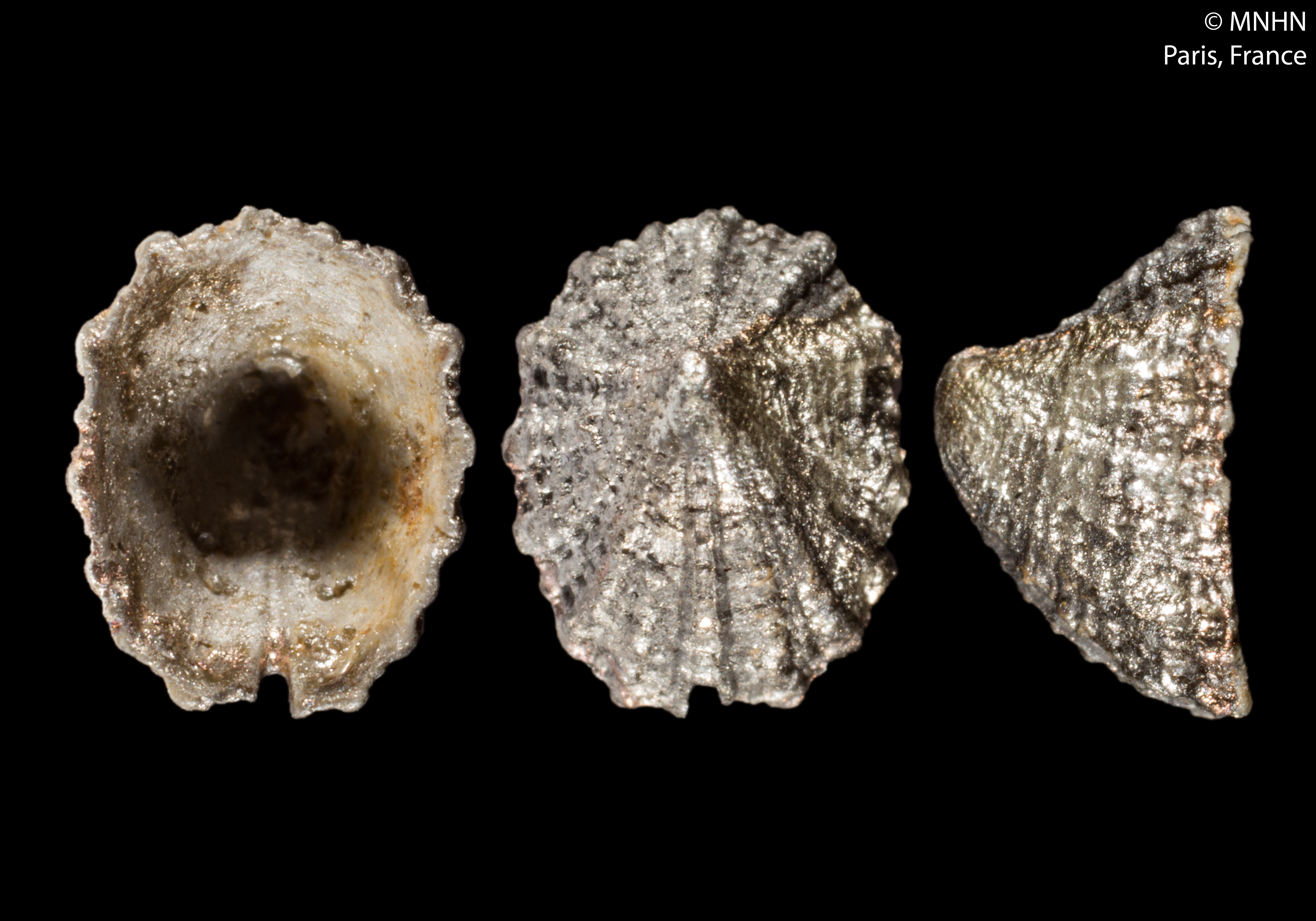
- Shell of Agariste phrygium

Scientific classification
- Kingdom: Animalia
- Phylum: Mollusca
- Class: Gastropoda
- Subclass: Vetigastropoda
- Order: Lepetellida
- Superfamily: Fissurelloidea
- Family: Fissurellidae
- Subfamily: Emarginulinae
- Genus: Agariste; Monterosato, 1892

Type species
- †Emarginula compressa Cantraine, 1835

= Agariste (gastropod) =

Genus of gastropods

Agariste is a genus of sea snails, marine gastropod mollusks in the family Fissurellidae, the keyhole limpets.

== Species ==
- Agariste compressa (Cantraine, 1835) †
- Agariste juliencilisi Landau & Marquet, 2003 †
- Agariste phrygium (Herbert & Kilburn, 1986)
