= Altrix trifolium =

Scientific classification
- Kingdom: Animalia
- Phylum: Mollusca
- Class: Gastropoda
- Subclass: Vetigastropoda
- Order: Lepetellida
- Family: Fissurellidae
- Genus: Altrix
- Species: A. trifolium

Binomial name
- Altrix trifolium (Dall, 1881)

Species of gastropod

Altrix trifolium is a species of sea snail, a marine gastropod mollusk in the family Fissurellidae, the keyhole limpets.

== Description ==
The shell can grow to be 12 mm to 28 mm in length.

== Distribution ==
Altrix trifolium can be found off of Yucatán, Colombia, and Barbados. It lives at a depth of 256 m to 1,170 m.
