= Clathrosepta =

Scientific classification
- Kingdom: Animalia
- Phylum: Mollusca
- Class: Gastropoda
- Subclass: Vetigastropoda
- Order: Lepetellida
- Family: Fissurellidae
- Subfamily: Emarginulinae
- Genus: Clathrosepta; McLean & Geiger, 1998

Genus of gastropods

Clathrosepta is a genus of sea snails, marine gastropod mollusks in the family Fissurellidae, the keyhole limpets.

== Species ==
Species within the genus Clathrosepta include:

- Clathrosepta becki McLean & Geiger, 1998
- Clathrosepta depressa McLean & Geiger, 1998
