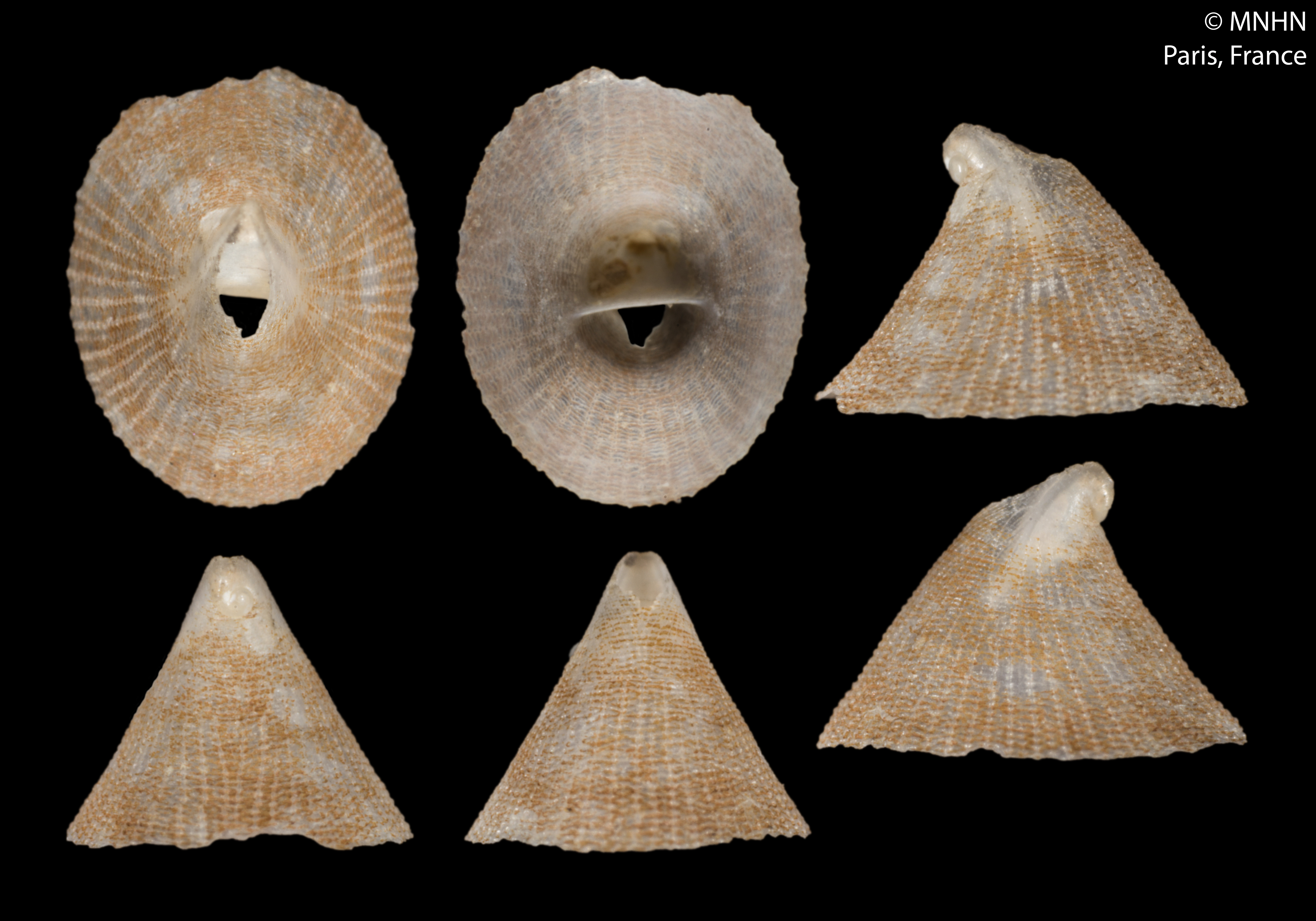
- Shell of Manganesepta atiaia (holotype at MNHN, Paris)

Scientific classification
- Kingdom: Animalia
- Phylum: Mollusca
- Class: Gastropoda
- Subclass: Vetigastropoda
- Order: Lepetellida
- Superfamily: Fissurelloidea
- Family: Fissurellidae
- Subfamily: Emarginulinae
- Genus: Manganesepta; McLean & Geiger, 1998

Type species
- Manganesepta hessleri McLean & Geiger, 1998

= Manganesepta =

Genus of gastropods

Manganesepta is a genus of sea snails, marine gastropod mollusks in the subfamily Emarginulinae of the family Fissurellidae, the keyhole limpets.

== Species ==
Species within the genus Manganesepta include:

- Manganesepta atiaia Simone & Cunha, 2014
- Manganesepta hessleri McLean & Geiger, 1998
