= Parmaphorella =

Scientific classification
- Kingdom: Animalia
- Phylum: Mollusca
- Class: Gastropoda
- Subclass: Vetigastropoda
- Order: Lepetellida
- Family: Fissurellidae
- Subfamily: Emarginulinae
- Genus: Parmaphorella; Strebel, 1907

Synonyms
- Parmophoridea Wenz, 1938 (unnecessary replacement name)

Genus of gastropods

Parmaphorella is a genus of sea snails, marine gastropod mollusks in the family Fissurellidae, the keyhole limpets.

Parmophoridea Wenz, 1938 is an unnecessary replacement name because Parmaphorella Strebel, 1907 is not preoccupied by Parmophorella Matthew, 1886

== Species ==
Species within the genus Parmophoridea include:

- Parmaphorella antarctica (Strebel, 1907)
- Parmaphorella mawsoni (Powell, 1958)
- Parmaphorella melvilli (Thiele, 1912)

Species brought into synonymy

- Parmaphorella barnardi Tomlin, 1932: synonym of Tugali barnardi (Tomlin, 1932)
