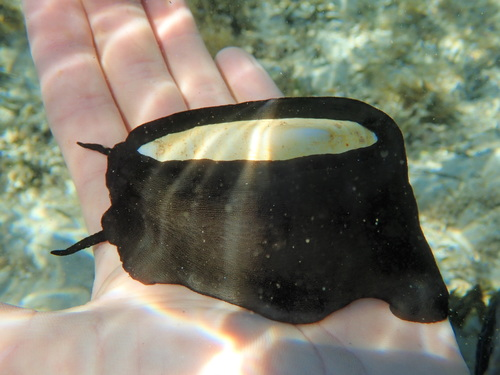
- Elephant snail in a human hand

Scientific classification
- Kingdom: Animalia
- Phylum: Mollusca
- Class: Gastropoda
- Subclass: Vetigastropoda
- Order: Lepetellida
- Family: Fissurellidae
- Genus: Scutus
- Species: S. antipodes

Binomial name
- Scutus antipodes Montfort, 1817

Synonyms
- Aviscutum veitchi Cotton, 1953; Parmophorus elongatus Blainville, 1817; Scutus elongatus (Blainville, 1817); Scutus veitchi (Cotton, 1953)

= Scutus antipodes =

Species of gastropod

Scutus antipodes, also known as the elephant snail, elephant slug, shield slug, or ducksbill limpet, is a large species of marine gastropod mollusc in the family Fissurellidae, the keyhole limpets and slit limpets. S. antipodes is endemic to the coasts of eastern Australia and Tasmania. It is often found under stones in tide pools, where it feeds on algae.

== Description ==
Scutus antipodes is recognisable by its size (up to 12.5 cm) and black mantle that often obscures or completely covers its shell. The shell is flat, white and shield-shaped.

== Gallery ==
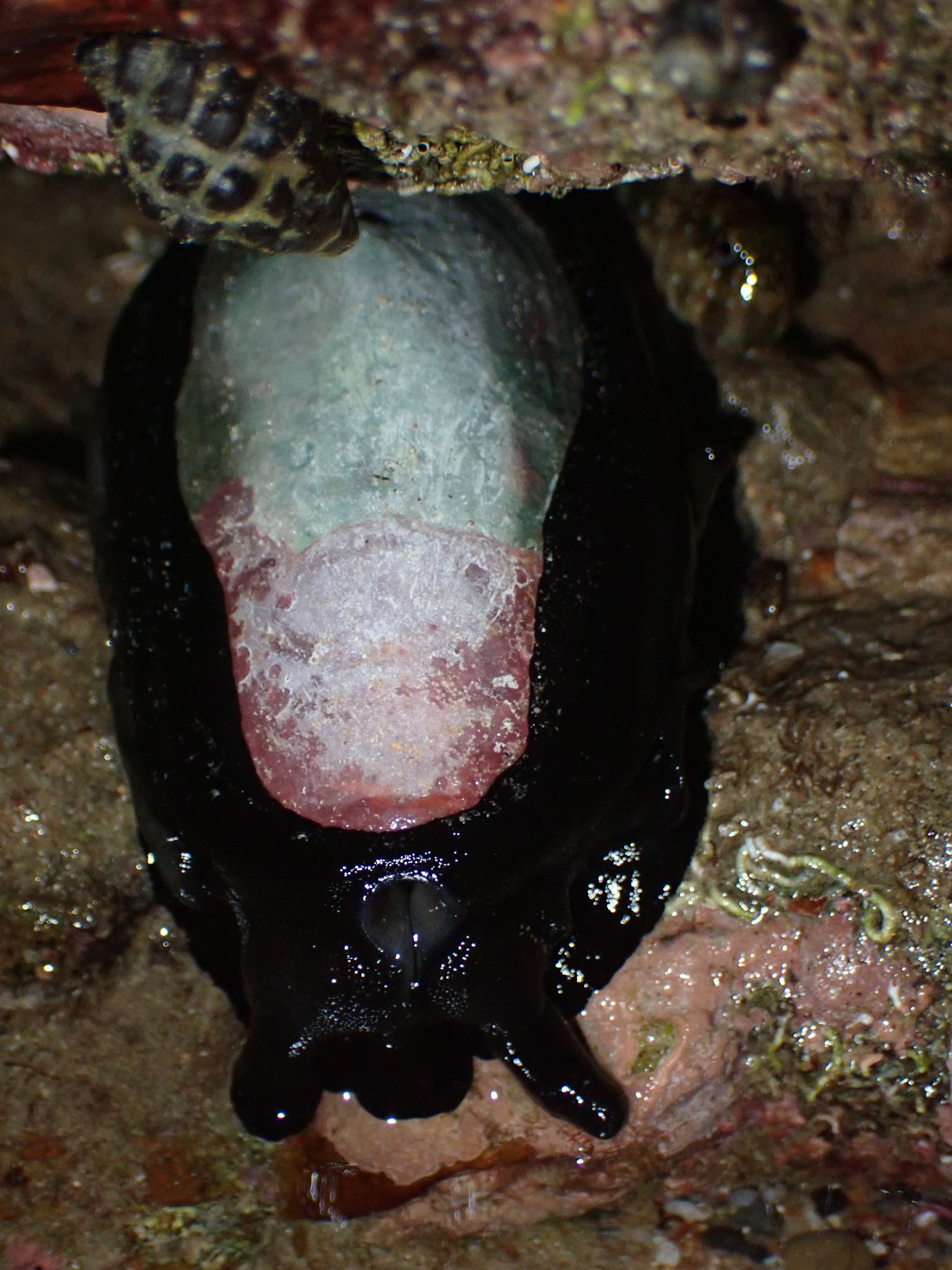
At Emerald Beach, NSW

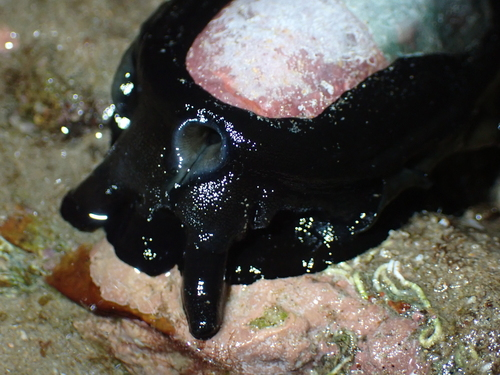
Closeup showing the head

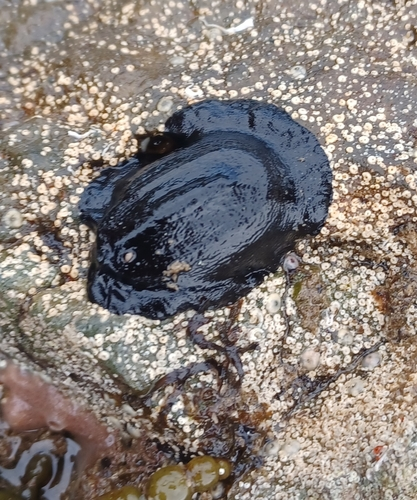
With shell completely covered by mantle

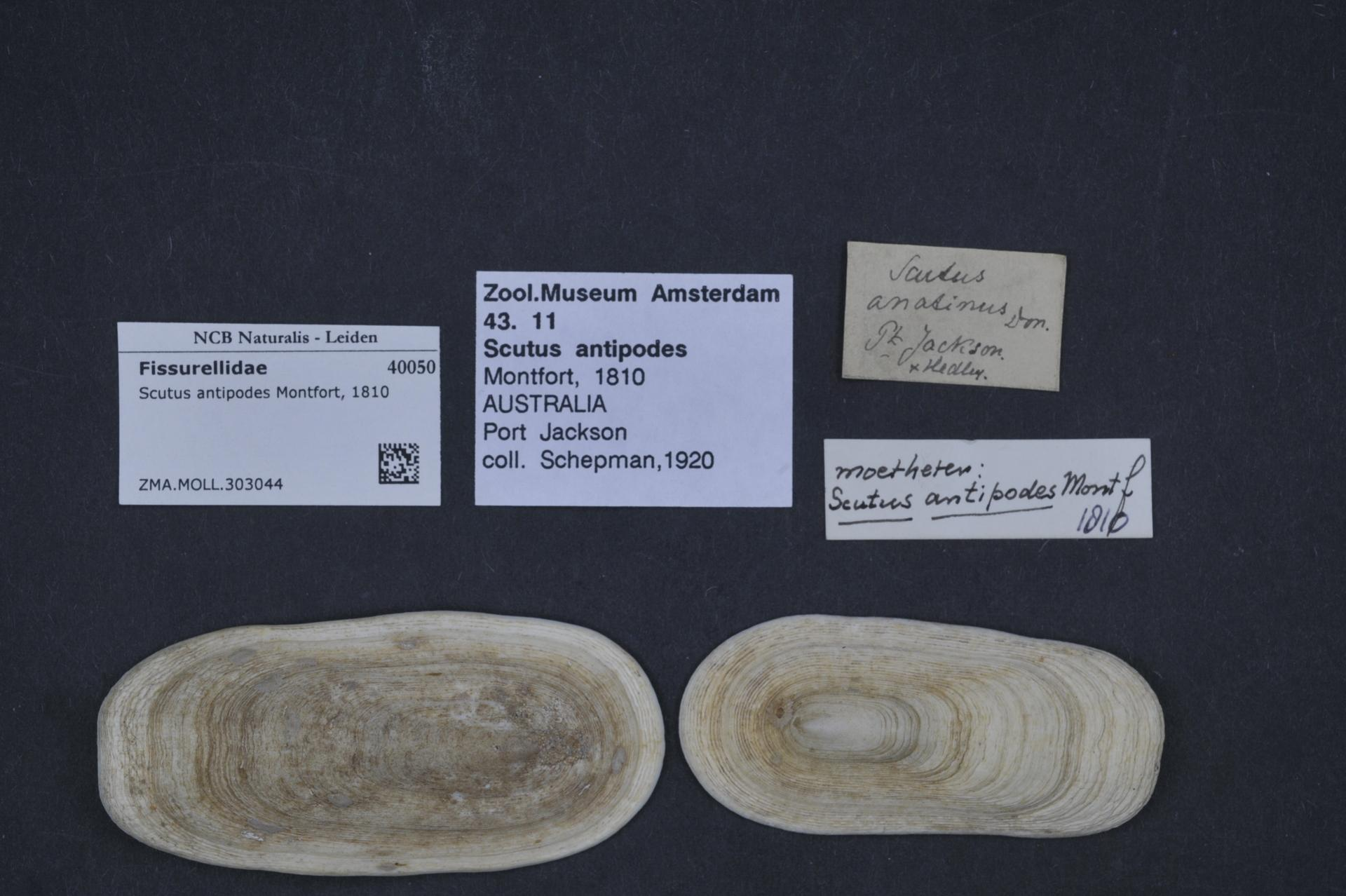
Shells from Scutus antipodes

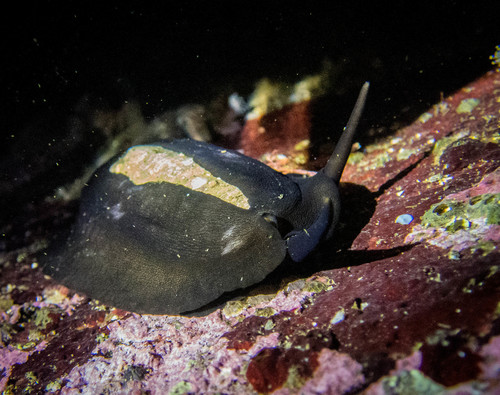
Elephant snail with mantle partially covering the shell
