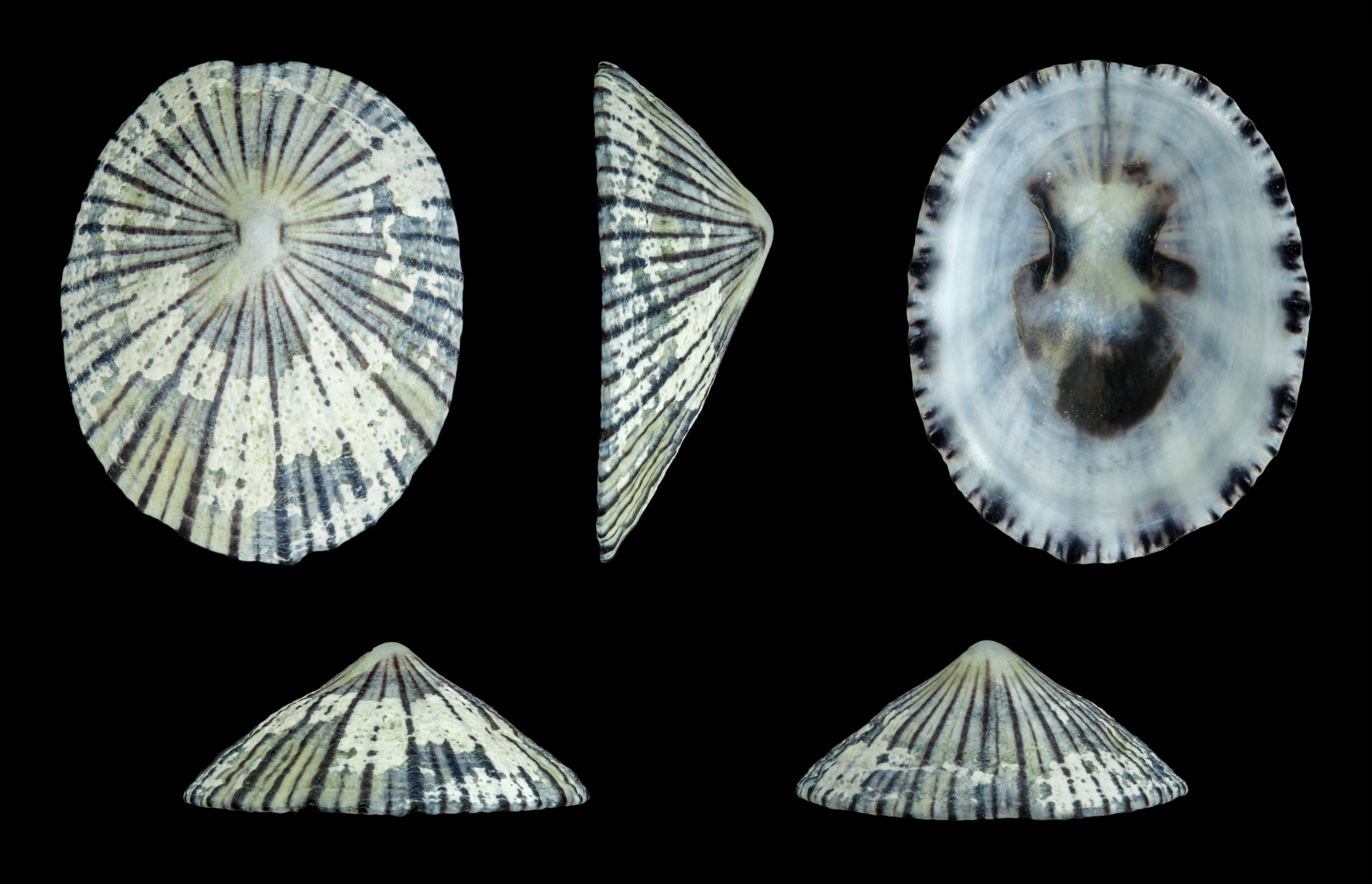

Scientific classification
- Kingdom: Animalia
- Phylum: Mollusca
- Class: Gastropoda
- Subclass: Vetigastropoda
- Order: Lepetellida
- Family: Fissurellidae
- Genus: Clypidina
- Species: C. notata

Binomial name
- Clypidina notata (Linnaeus, 1758)

Synonyms
- Patella notata Linnaeus, 1758

= Clypidina notata =

Species of gastropod

Clypidina notata, common name the black-ribbed false limpet, is a species of sea snail, a marine gastropod mollusk in the family Fissurellidae, the keyhole limpets.

== Description ==
The size of the shell reaches 18 mm.

== Distribution ==
This species occurs in the Indian Ocean.

== Gallery ==
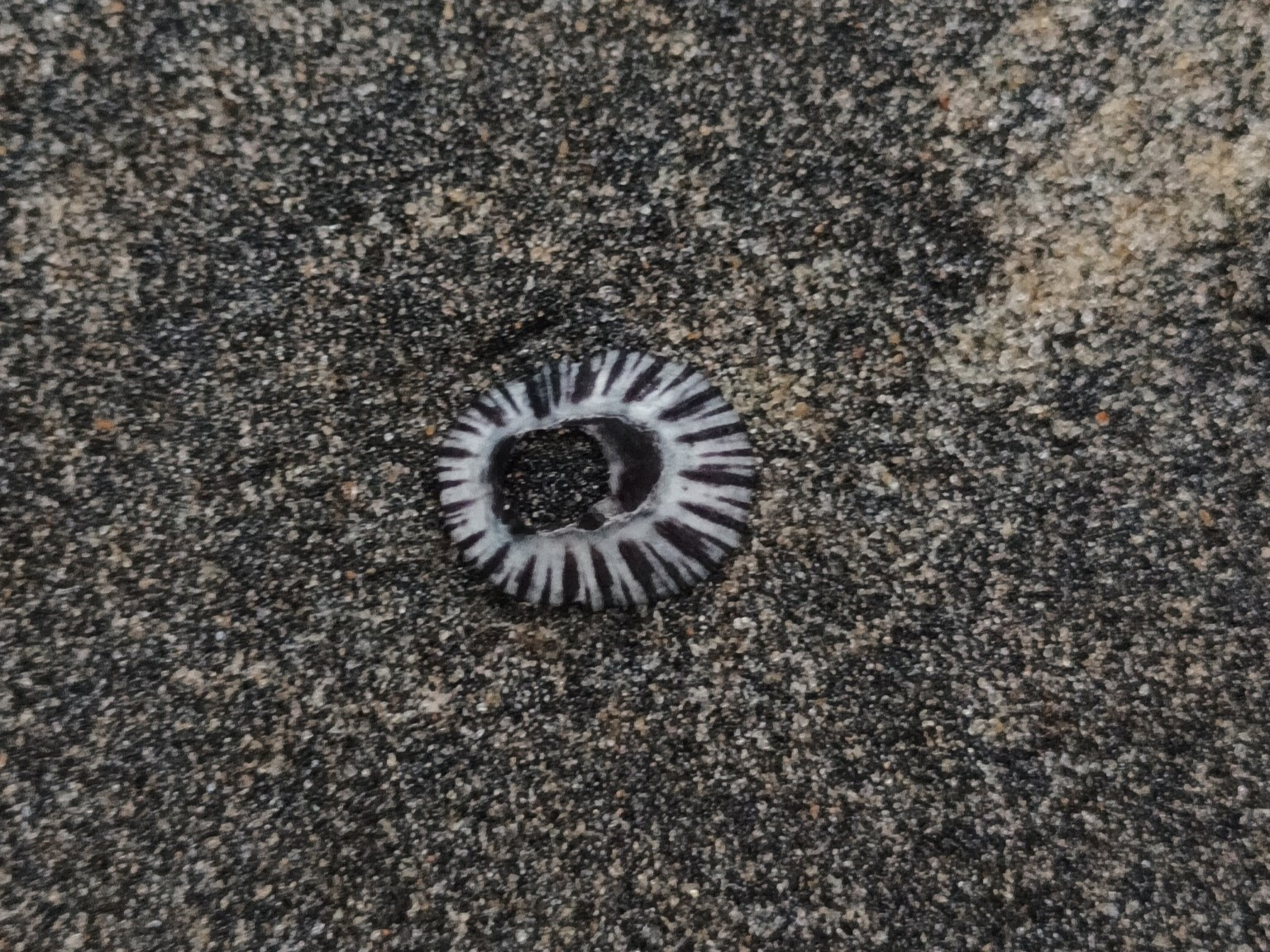
Clypidina notata from Kovalam, Trivandrum, Kerala
