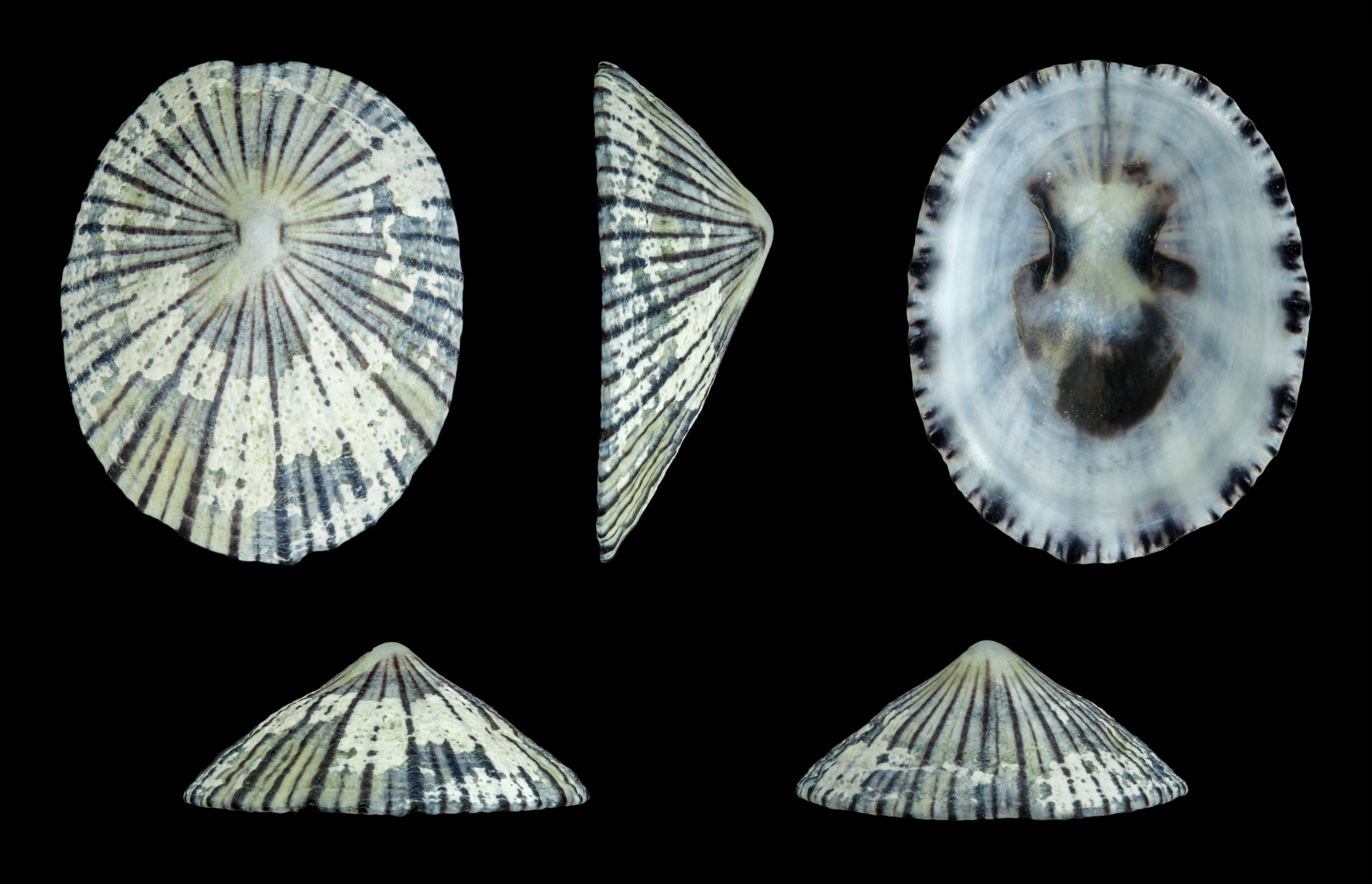
- Clypidina notata

Scientific classification
- Kingdom: Animalia
- Phylum: Mollusca
- Class: Gastropoda
- Subclass: Vetigastropoda
- Order: Lepetellida
- Family: Fissurellidae
- Subfamily: Emarginulinae
- Genus: Clypidina; Gray, 1847

= Clypidina =

Genus of gastropods

Clypidina is a genus of sea snails, marine gastropod mollusks in the family Fissurellidae, the keyhole limpets.

== Species ==
Species within the genus Clypidina include:

- Clypidina notata (Linnaeus, 1758)
- † Clypidina thurgensis Gray, 1847
