= Lucapinella limatula =

Scientific classification
- Kingdom: Animalia
- Phylum: Mollusca
- Class: Gastropoda
- Subclass: Vetigastropoda
- Order: Lepetellida
- Family: Fissurellidae
- Genus: Lucapinella
- Species: L. limatula

Binomial name
- Lucapinella limatula (Reeve, 1850)

Synonyms
- Fissurella aculeata Reeve, 1850; Fissurella limatula Reeve, 1850; Fissurellidea limatula Reeve, 1850; Lucapina limatula Reeve, 1850; Lucapinella talanteia Olsson & Harbison, 1953

Species of gastropod

Lucapinella limatula is a species of sea snail, a marine gastropod mollusk in the family Fissurellidae, the keyhole limpets.

== Description ==
Length 1/2 to 3/4 inches. Shell oval, only moderately elevated; orifice near center and large, often somewhat triangular. Sculpture of alternating larger and smaller radiating ribs, made scaly by concentric wrinkles. Color brownish, with spotted whitish rays; interior white.

== Distribution ==
This species occurs in moderately deep water in the Atlantic Ocean off the Cape Verdes, West Africa, Angola; in the Caribbean Sea, the Gulf of Mexico and the Lesser Antilles.
