= Lucapinella versluysi =

Scientific classification
- Kingdom: Animalia
- Phylum: Mollusca
- Class: Gastropoda
- Subclass: Vetigastropoda
- Order: Lepetellida
- Family: Fissurellidae
- Genus: Lucapinella
- Species: L. versluysi

Binomial name
- Lucapinella versluysi Dautzenberg, 1900

Species of gastropod

Lucapinella versluysi is a species of sea snail, a marine gastropod mollusk in the family Fissurellidae, the keyhole limpets.

== Distribution ==
This species occurs in the Mediterranean Sea and in the Atlantic Ocean off the Cape Verdes, Senegal and Congo.
