= Clathrosepta depressa =

Scientific classification
- Kingdom: Animalia
- Phylum: Mollusca
- Class: Gastropoda
- Subclass: Vetigastropoda
- Order: Lepetellida
- Family: Fissurellidae
- Genus: Clathrosepta
- Species: C. depressa

Binomial name
- Clathrosepta depressa McLean & Geiger, 1998

Species of gastropod

Clathrosepta depressa is a species of sea snail, a marine gastropod mollusk in the family Fissurellidae, the keyhole limpets.

== Description ==
The size of the shell reaches 13 mm.

== Distribution ==
This species occurs on the East Pacific Rise, a mid-ocean ridge.
