= Parmaphorella mawsoni =

Scientific classification
- Kingdom: Animalia
- Phylum: Mollusca
- Class: Gastropoda
- Subclass: Vetigastropoda
- Order: Lepetellida
- Family: Fissurellidae
- Genus: Parmaphorella
- Species: P. mawsoni

Binomial name
- Parmaphorella mawsoni Powell, 1958

Synonyms
- Parmophoridea mawsoni (Powell, 1958)

Species of gastropod

Parmaphorella mawsoni is a species of sea snail, a marine gastropod mollusk in the family Fissurellidae, the keyhole limpets.
