= Buchanania (gastropod) =

Scientific classification
- Kingdom: Animalia
- Phylum: Mollusca
- Class: Gastropoda
- Subclass: Vetigastropoda
- Order: Lepetellida
- Family: Fissurellidae
- Subfamily: Emarginulinae
- Genus: Buchanania; Lesson, 1831

Type species
- Buchanania onchidioides Lesson, 1831

Genus of gastropods

Buchanania is a genus of sea snails, marine gastropod mollusks in the family Fissurellidae, the keyhole limpets and slit limpets.

== Species ==
Species within the genus Buchanania include:

- Buchanania onchidioides Lesson, 1831
