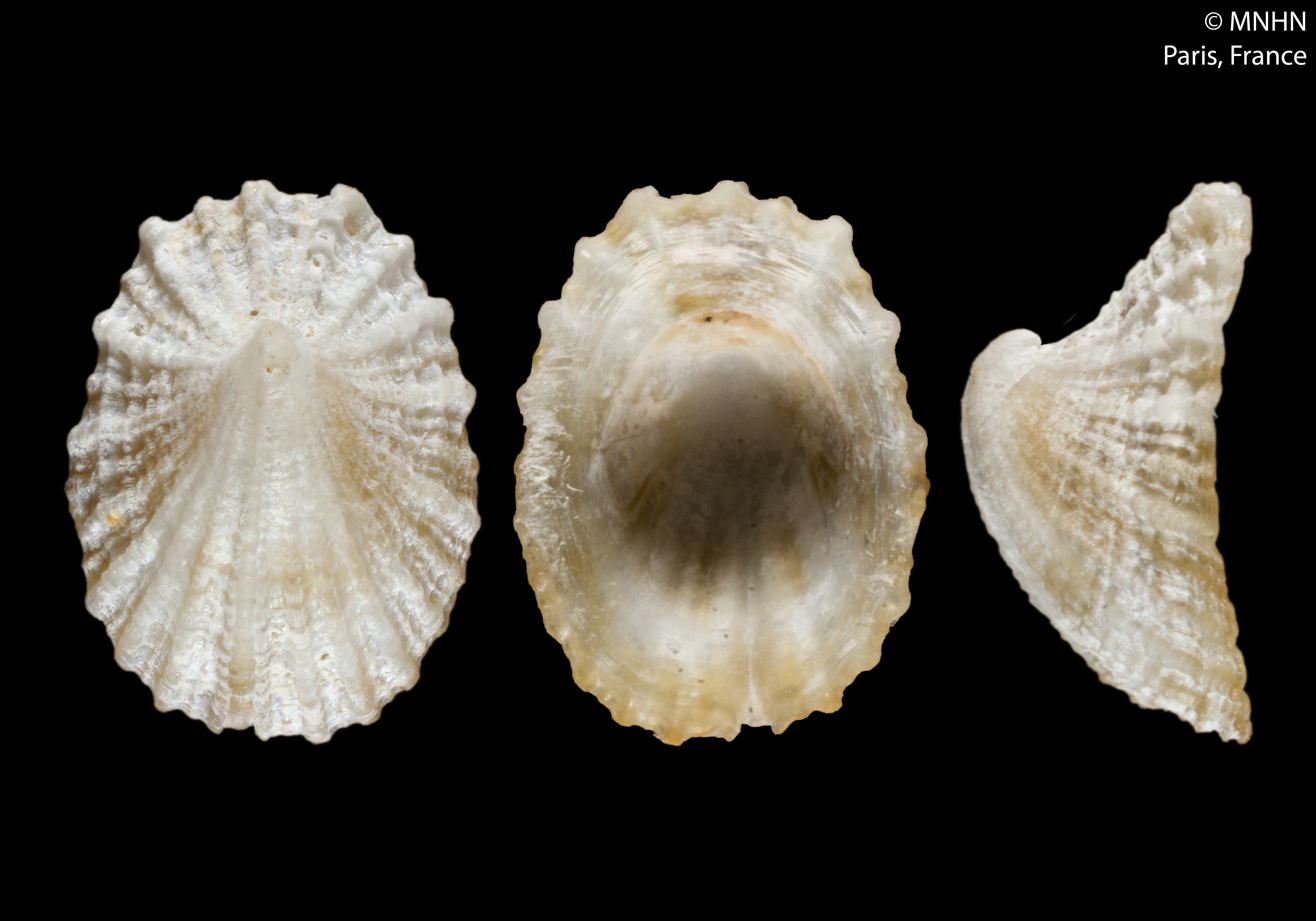
- Shell of Montfortula brevirimata (holotype at MNHN, Paris)

Scientific classification
- Kingdom: Animalia
- Phylum: Mollusca
- Class: Gastropoda
- Subclass: Vetigastropoda
- Order: Lepetellida
- Family: Fissurellidae
- Subfamily: Hemitominae
- Genus: Montfortula
- Species: M. brevirimata

Binomial name
- Montfortula brevirimata (Deshayes, 1862)

Synonyms
- Clypidina brevirimata (Deshayes, 1863); Emarginula brevirimata Deshayes, 1862

= Montfortula brevirimata =

Species of gastropod

Montfortula brevirimata is a species of sea snail, a marine gastropod mollusk in the family Fissurellidae, the keyhole and slit limpets.

== Description ==
The length of the shell attains 5 mm.

== Distribution ==
This marine species occurs off Réunion.
