= Montfortula chathamensis =

Scientific classification
- Kingdom: Animalia
- Phylum: Mollusca
- Class: Gastropoda
- Subclass: Vetigastropoda
- Order: Lepetellida
- Family: Fissurellidae
- Subfamily: Hemitominae
- Genus: Montfortula
- Species: M. chathamensis

Binomial name
- Montfortula chathamensis Finlay, 1928

Species of gastropod

Montfortula chathamensis is a species of sea snail, a marine gastropod mollusk in the family Fissurellidae, the keyhole limpets and slit limpets.
