= Emarginella planulata =

Scientific classification
- Kingdom: Animalia
- Phylum: Mollusca
- Class: Gastropoda
- Subclass: Vetigastropoda
- Order: Lepetellida
- Family: Fissurellidae
- Genus: Emarginella
- Species: E. planulata

Binomial name
- Emarginella planulata (A. Adams, 1852)

Synonyms
- Emarginula planulata A. Adams, 1852

Species of gastropod

Emarginella planulata is a species of sea snail, a marine gastropod mollusk in the family Fissurellidae, the keyhole limpets and slit limpets.
