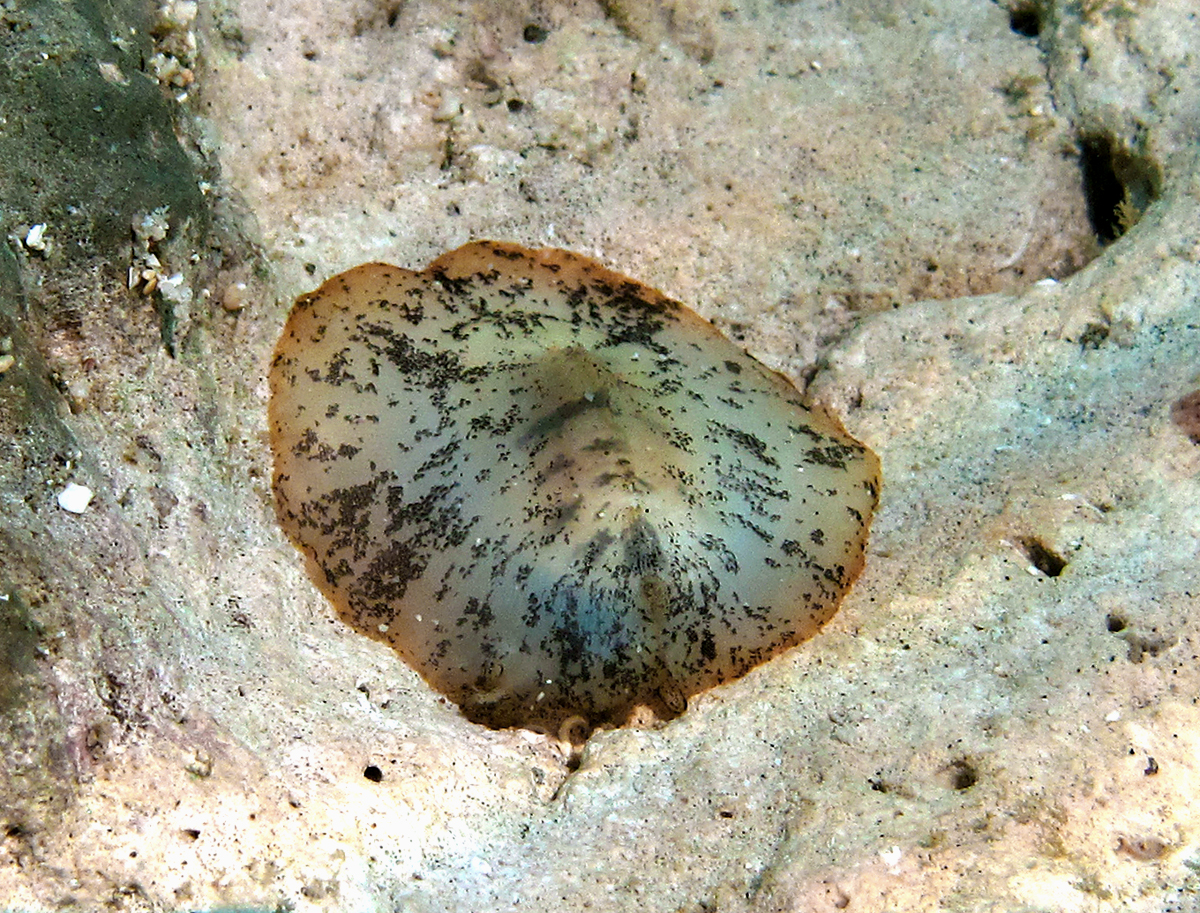
- a live Scutus sinensis

Scientific classification
- Kingdom: Animalia
- Phylum: Mollusca
- Class: Gastropoda
- Subclass: Vetigastropoda
- Order: Lepetellida
- Family: Fissurellidae
- Subfamily: Emarginulinae
- Genus: Scutus
- Species: S. sinensis

Binomial name
- Scutus sinensis (Blainville, 1825)

Synonyms
- Parmophorus chinensis Blainville, 1825; Parmophorus sinensis Blainville, 1825; Scutus (Aviscutum) sinensis (Blainville, 1825)

= Scutus sinensis =

Species of gastropod

Scutus sinensis is a species of sea snail, a marine gastropod mollusk in the family Fissurellidae, the keyhole limpets and slit limpets.
