= Clathrosepta becki =

Scientific classification
- Kingdom: Animalia
- Phylum: Mollusca
- Class: Gastropoda
- Subclass: Vetigastropoda
- Order: Lepetellida
- Family: Fissurellidae
- Genus: Clathrosepta
- Species: C. becki

Binomial name
- Clathrosepta becki McLean & Geiger, 1998

Species of gastropod

Clathrosepta becki is a species of sea snail, a marine gastropod mollusk in the family Fissurellidae, the keyhole limpets.

== Distribution ==
This marine species occurs off New Guinea.
