= Laeviemarginula =

Scientific classification
- Kingdom: Animalia
- Phylum: Mollusca
- Class: Gastropoda
- Subclass: Vetigastropoda
- Order: Lepetellida
- Family: Fissurellidae
- Subfamily: Emarginulinae
- Genus: Laeviemarginula; Habe, 1953

Type species
- Laeviemarginula membranacea Habe, 1953

Genus of gastropods

Laeviemarginula is a genus of sea snails, marine gastropod mollusks in the family Fissurellidae, the keyhole limpets and slit limpets.

== Species ==
Species within the genus Laeviemarginula include:

- Laeviemarginula kimberti (Cotton, 1930)

The following species were brought into synonymy:

- Laeviemarginula membranacea Habe, 1953: synonym of Laeviemarginula kimberti (Cotton, 1930)
