= Altrix =

Scientific classification
- Kingdom: Animalia
- Phylum: Mollusca
- Class: Gastropoda
- Subclass: Vetigastropoda
- Order: Lepetellida
- Family: Fissurellidae
- Subfamily: Emarginulinae
- Genus: Altrix; Palmer, 1942

Synonyms
- Folia Palmer, 1937; Puncturella (Esmeria) Olsson, 1964; Puncturella (Altrix) Sohl, 1992

Genus of gastropods

Altrix is a genus of sea snails, marine gastropod mollusks in the family Fissurellidae, the keyhole limpets.

== Species ==
Species within the genus Aktrix include:

- Altrix trifolium (Dall, 1881)
- Altrix altior (Meyer & Aldrich, 1886)
- Altrix leesi (Sohl, 1992)
- Altrix pacifica (Squires & Goedert, 1996)
- Altrix palmerae (Olsson, 1964)
