= Manganesepta hessleri =

Scientific classification
- Kingdom: Animalia
- Phylum: Mollusca
- Class: Gastropoda
- Subclass: Vetigastropoda
- Order: Lepetellida
- Family: Fissurellidae
- Genus: Manganesepta
- Species: M. hessleri

Binomial name
- Manganesepta hessleri McLean & Geiger, 1998

Species of gastropod

Manganesepta hessleri is a species of sea snail, a marine gastropod mollusc in the family Fissurellidae, the keyhole limpets.

== Description ==
The size of the shell reaches 2.6 mm.

== Distribution ==
This marine species occurs in the northern part of the equatorial Pacific Ocean.
