= Emarginella incisura =

Scientific classification
- Kingdom: Animalia
- Phylum: Mollusca
- Class: Gastropoda
- Subclass: Vetigastropoda
- Order: Lepetellida
- Family: Fissurellidae
- Genus: Emarginella
- Species: E. incisura

Binomial name
- Emarginella incisura (Adams, 1852)

Synonyms
- Emarginula incisura Adams, 1852

Species of gastropod

Emarginella incisura is a species of sea snail, a marine gastropod mollusk in the family Fissurellidae, the keyhole limpets and slit limpets.
