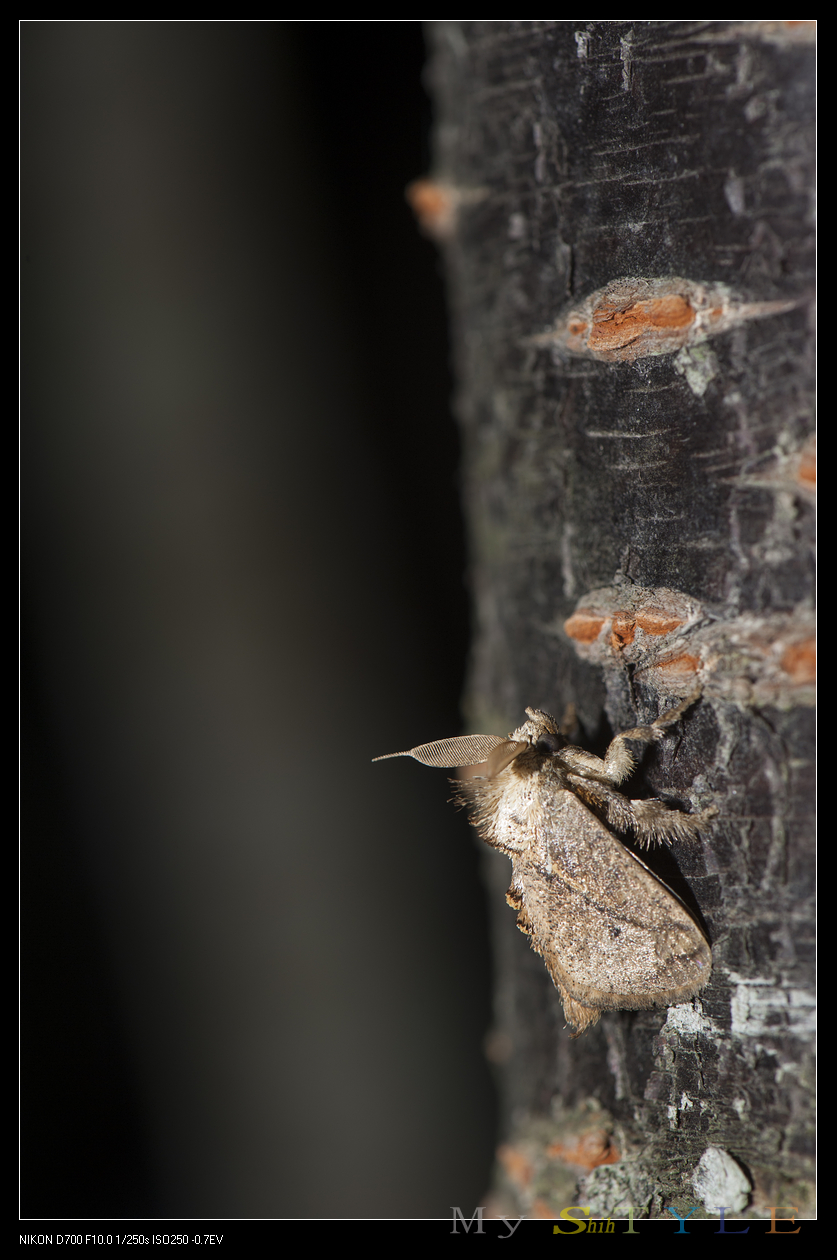

Scientific classification
- Kingdom: Animalia
- Phylum: Arthropoda
- Clade: Pancrustacea
- Class: Insecta
- Order: Lepidoptera
- Family: Limacodidae
- Genus: Susica
- Species: S. sinensis

Binomial name
- Susica sinensis (Walker, 1856)

Synonyms
- Tadema sinensis Walker, 1856; Susica formosana Wileman, 1911; Susica fusca Matsumura, 1911

= Susica sinensis =

Species of moth

Susica sinensis, the statuesque cup moth, is a moth of the family Limacodidae. It is found in China, Taiwan, Laos, Thailand and Vietnam.
