= Scoparia sinensis =

Scientific classification
- Kingdom: Animalia
- Phylum: Arthropoda
- Class: Insecta
- Order: Lepidoptera
- Family: Crambidae
- Genus: Scoparia
- Species: S. sinensis

Binomial name
- Scoparia sinensis Leraut, 1986

Species of moth

Scoparia sinensis is a moth in the family Crambidae. It was described by Patrice J.A. Leraut in 1986. It is found in the Chinese provinces of Zhejiang, Guizhou, Hubei, Shandong and Sichuan.

The length of the forewings is 7–8 mm.
