= Charles Payraudeau =

French zoologist

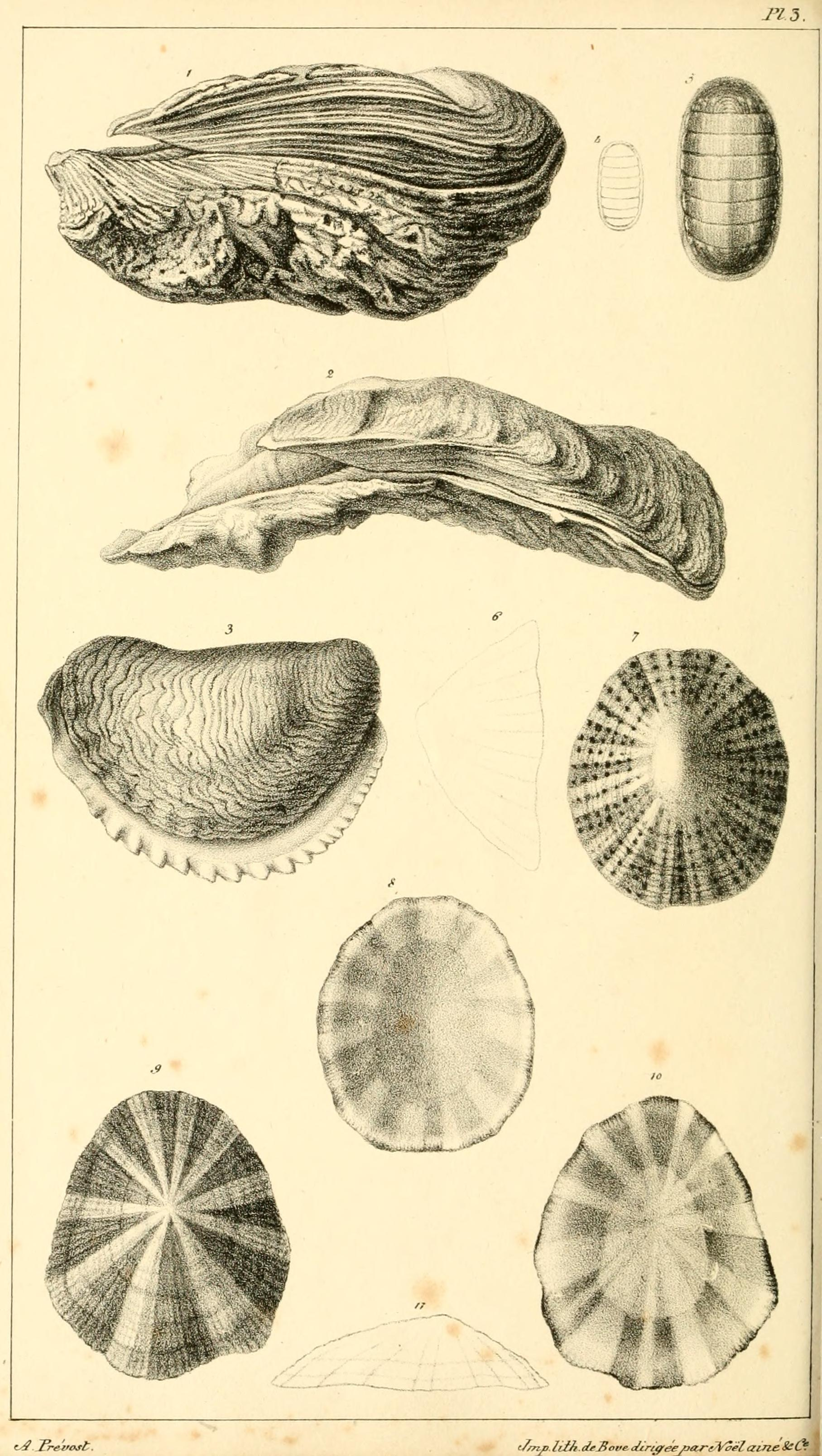
Plate from Catalogue descriptif et méthodique des annélides et des mollusques de l'île de Corse (1826)

Charles Payraudeau (1798–1865) was a French zoologist.

Benjamin Charles Marie Payraudeau studied with Jean-Baptiste de Lamarck (1744–1829) at Muséum national d'histoire naturelle. He compiled faunal lists for Corsica between 1824 and 1825. On this expedition he discovered Audouin's gull and a (now) subspecies desmarestii, of the European shag. He described them in Deux espèces nouvelles d'oiseaux, appartenant aux genres Mouette et Cormoran published in "Revue Annales de Sciences Naturelles" (Paris, 1826, tome 8, p. 460-465). He also wrote "Catalogue descriptif et méthodique des annélides et des mollusques de l'île de Corse" (1826). He is credited with providing descriptions for 71 new species of marine and terrestrial mollusks (32 of which are considered valid species today).

His entire ornithological collection is conserved as a museum in the Mairie of La Chaize-le-Vicomte in Vendée. It is named for him as Musée ornithologique Charles-Payraudeau.
