= Pierre Denys de Montfort =

French zoologist (1766–1820)

- Born: 17 June 1766; Dunkerque, France
- Died: 12 February 1821 (aged 54); Paris
- Known for: Enquiries into the existence of gigantic octopuses
- Scientific career
- Fields: Malacology

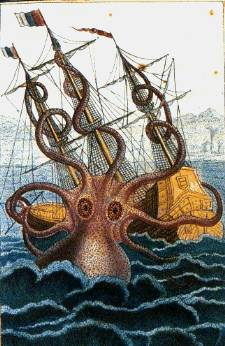
Colossal Octopus by Pierre Denys de Montfort, 1801

Pierre Denys de Montfort, also spelt Pierre Dénys de Montfort, (1766–1820) was a French naturalist, in particular a malacologist, remembered today for his pioneering inquiries into the existence of the gigantic octopuses. He was inspired by a description from 1783 of an eight-metre long tentacle found in the mouth of a sperm whale.

Montfort was author of Conchyliologie systématique, et classification méthodique de coquilles (2 vols., Paris 1808–1810) and of Histoire Naturelle Générale et Particulière des Mollusques (2 vols., Paris 1801–1802) published as an addendum to the comte de Buffon's Histoire Naturelle, générale et particulière.

He appears also to have been the author of Petit vocabulaire à l'usage des Français et des Alliés, renfermant les noms d'une partie des choses les plus essentielles à la vie en plusieurs langues: français, Latin, hébreu, hollandais, allemand, anglais, espagnol, italien, etc par M. Denys de Montfort, which appeared in 1815, as Paris filled with the polyglot armies of the Allies, after the fall of Napoleon in 1814.

Montfort later advanced more sensational claims. He proposed that ten British warships that had mysteriously disappeared one night in 1782 must have been attacked and sunk by giant octopuses. The British knew what had happened to the ships, resulting in a disgraceful revelation for Montfort. His career never recovered and he died starving and poor in Paris around 1820. Many of his sources for the "kraken octopus" probably described the very real giant squid, Architeuthis, proven to exist in 1857.

== Taxa ==
Montfort named some taxa of gastropods including:

- Lanistes Montfort, 1810 - a genus of freshwater apple snails
- Scutus antipodes Montfort, 1810
