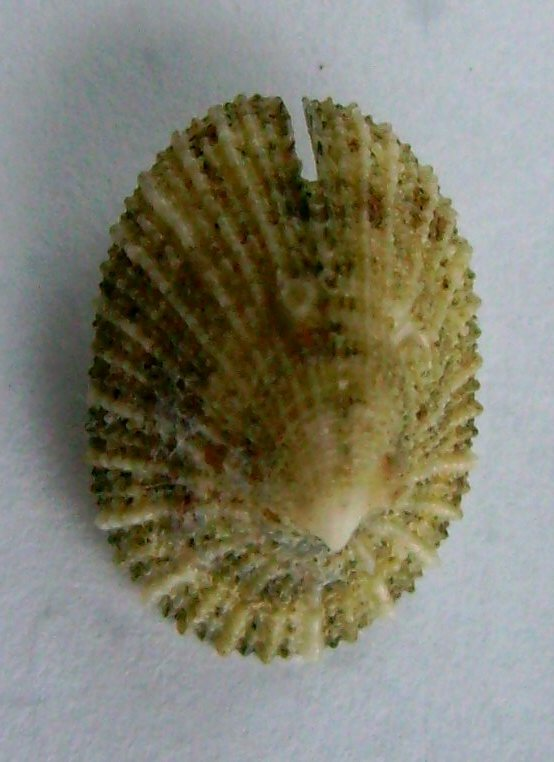
- A shell of Emarginula striatula

Scientific classification
- Kingdom: Animalia
- Phylum: Mollusca
- Class: Gastropoda
- Subclass: Vetigastropoda
- Order: Lepetellida
- Family: Fissurellidae
- Subfamily: Emarginulinae; Children, 1834

Synonyms
- Clypidinidae Golikov & Starobogatov, 1989; Emarginulidae Children, 1834 (original rank); Fissurellideinae Pilsbry, 1890

= Emarginulinae =

Subfamily of limpet-like sea snails

The subfamily Emarginulinae, common name keyhole limpets and slit limpets, is a taxonomic subfamily of limpet-like sea snails, marine gastropod molluscs in the family Fissurellidae, the keyhole limpets and slit limpets.

The subfamily consists of the following tribes:

- Tribe Emarginulini Children, 1834 - synonyms: Rimulidae, Anton, 1838; Zeidoridae Naef, 1913; Hemitominae Kuroda, Habe & Oyama, 1971; Clypidinidae Golikov & Starobogatov, 1989
- Tribe Diodorini Odhner, 1932: this tribe has been raised to the rank of subfamily Diodorinae Odhner, 1932
- Tribe Fissurellideini Pilsbry, 1890
- Tribe Scutini Christiaens, 1973

Of the subfamilies in Fissurellidae, the subfamily Emarginulinae is the oldest: its earliest known species date back to the Mesozoic.

The various tribes belong to this subfamily because of the unifying features in their radula. Several tribes were formerlysynonym of subfamilies, because of the differences in their shell. The Emargulini have a caplike shell with a slit in the margin but without an apical opening (foramen). The Scutini have a flat shield-shaped shell with a vague indentation at the back. The other tribes have a caplike shell with a round, oval or triangular apical opening.

The species of this subfamily can be found attached to rocks or coral. They are Herbivores.

== Genera ==
- Agariste Monterosato, 1892
- Altrix Palmer, 1942
- Arginula Palmer, 1937
- Buchanania Lesson, 1831
- Clathrosepta McLean & Geiger, 1998
- Clypidina Gray, 1847
- Emarginella Pilsbry, 1891
- Emarginula Lamarck, 1801
- † Entomella Cossmann, 1888
- Fissurisepta Seguenza, 1863
- Laeviemarginula Habe, 1953
- Laevinesta Pilsbry & McGinty, 1952
- Manganesepta McLean & Geiger, 1998
- Montfortula Iredale, 1915
- † Palaeoloxotoma Hansen, 201
- Parmaphorella Strebel, 1907
- Pupillaea Gray, 1835
- Rixa Iredale, 1924
- Scelidotoma McLean, 1966
- Scutus Montfort, 1810
- Stromboli Berry, 1954
- Tugali Gray, 1843
- Tugalina Habe, 1953
- Vacerrena Iredale, 1958

Taxa inquirenda

- Clypidella Swainson, 1840
- Rimulanax Iredale, 1924 (possible synonym of Puncturella)

== Synonyms ==
- Aviscutum Iredale, 1940synonym of Scutus Montfort, 1810
- Entomella Cotton, 1945synonym of Emarginula Lamarck, 1801 (invalid: junior homonym of Entomella Cossmann, 1888; Notomella is a replacement name)
- † Loxotoma P. Fischer, 1885 synonym of † Palaeoloxotoma Hansen, 2019 (invalid: junior homonym of Loxotoma Zeller, 1854 [Lepidoptera]; Palaeoloxotoma is a replacement name)
- Nannoscutum Iredale, 1937synonym of Scutus Montfort, 1810
- Notomella Cotton, 1957synonym of Emarginula Lamarck, 1801
- Parmophoridea Wenz, 1938synonym of Parmaphorella Strebel, 1907 (unnecessary replacement name)
- Parmophorus Blainville, 1817synonym of Scutus Montfort, 1810 (unnecessary substitute name for Scutus)
- Plagiorhytis P. Fischer, 1885synonym of Montfortula Iredale, 1915 (Invalid: junior homonym of Plagiorhytis Chaudoir, 1848)
- Rimularia Bronn, 1838synonym of Rimula Defrance, 1827 (unjustified emendation of Rimula Defrance, 1827)
- Scutum P. Fischer, 1885synonym of Scutus Montfort, 1810 (invalid: unjustified emendation of Scutus)
- Semperia Crosse, 1867synonym of Emarginula Lamarck, 1801
- Subzeidora Iredale, 1924synonym of Emarginula (Subzeidora) Iredale, 1924 represented as Emarginula Lamarck, 1801
- Tugalia Gray, 1857synonym of Tugali Gray, 1843
- Vacerra Iredale, 1924synonym of Vacerrena Iredale, 1958 (invalid: junior homonym of Vacerra Godman, 1900 [Lepidoptera];Vacerrena is a replacement name)
- Variegemarginula McLean, 2011synonym of Montfortula Iredale, 1915
