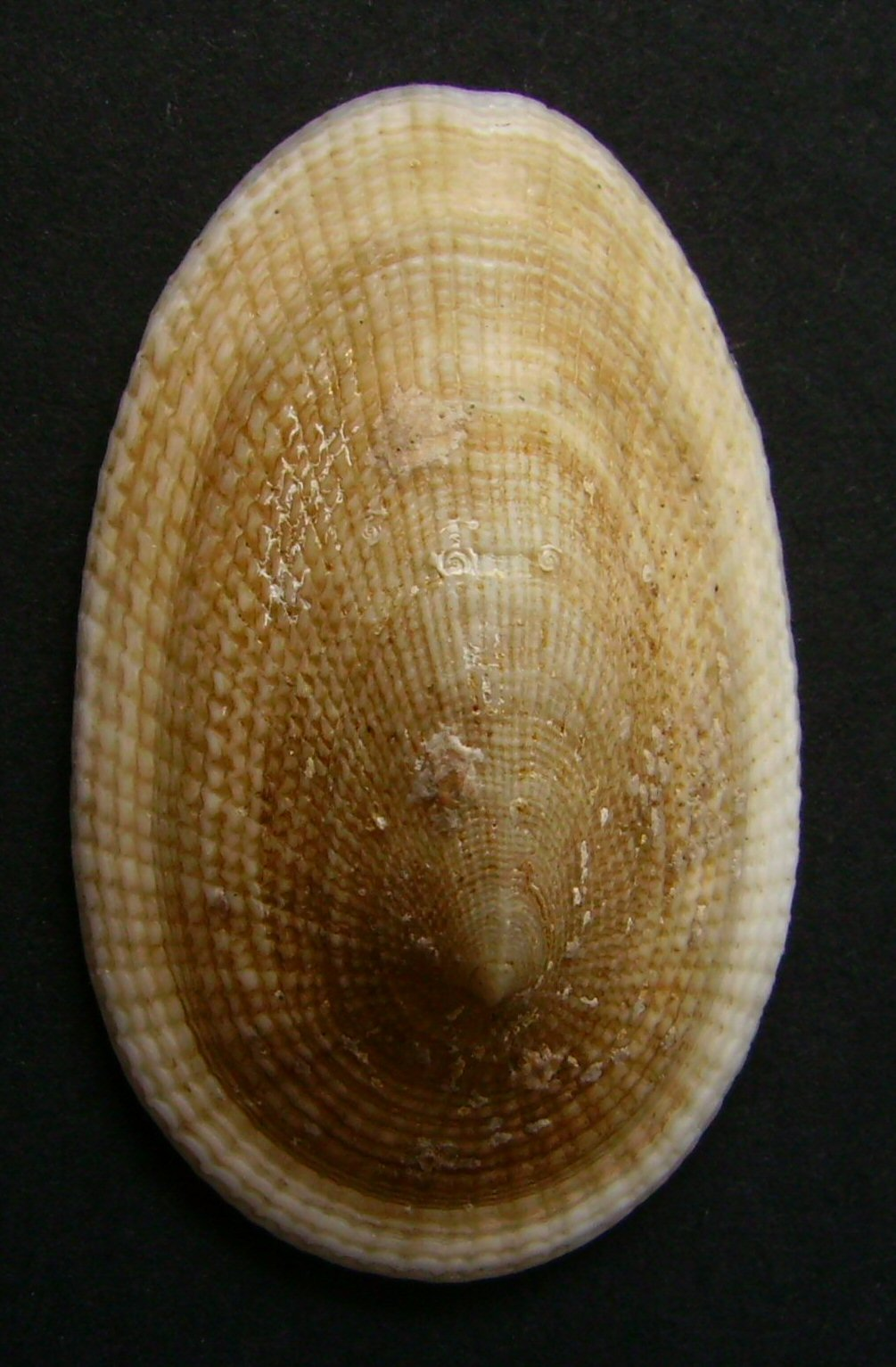
- A shell of Tugali elegans, anterior end towards the top

Scientific classification
- Kingdom: Animalia
- Phylum: Mollusca
- Class: Gastropoda
- Subclass: Vetigastropoda
- Order: Lepetellida
- Superfamily: Fissurelloidea
- Family: Fissurellidae
- Subfamily: Emarginulinae
- Genus: Tugali; Gray, 1843

Type species
- Tugali elegans Gray, 1843

Synonyms
- Emarginula (Tugali) Gray, 1843; Emarginula (Tugalia) Gray, 1857; Scutus (Tugali) Gray, 1843; Scutus (Tugalia) Gray, 1857 (incorrect subsequent spelling); Subemarginula (Tugalia) Gray, 1857 (incorrect subsequent spelling of Tugali); Tugalia Gray, 1857

= Tugali =

Genus of gastropods

Tugali is a genus of small sea snails or limpets, a marine gastropod mollusc in the subfamily Emarginulinae of the family Fissurellidae, the keyhole limpets and slit limpets.

== Species and subspecies ==
Species and subspecies within the genus Tugali include:

- † Tugali aranea Marwick, 1928
- Tugali barnardi (Tomlin, 1932)
- Tugali carinata (A. Adams, 1852)
- Tugali chilensis McLean, 1970
- Tugali cicatricosa Adams, 1852
- Tugali colvillensis Finlay, 1927
- Tugali decussata Adams, 1852
- † Tugali elata (Suter, 1917)
- Tugali elegans Gray, 1843
- Tugali oblonga (Pease, 1860)
- † Tugali opuraensis Bartrum & Powell, 1928
- Tugali parmophoidea (Quoy & Gaimard, 1834)
- † Tugali pliocenica Finlay, 1926
- Tugali scutellaris Adams, 1852
- Tugali stewartiana Powell, 1939
- † Tugali superba Powell, 1934
- Tugali suteri (Thiele, 1916)
  - Tugali suteri sutherlandi Fleming, 1948

Species brought into synonymy

- Tugali chilensis Sowerby I, 1834: synonym of Fissurella costata (Lesson, 1830)
- Tugali gigas (Martens, 1881): synonym of Tugalina gigas (Martens, 1881)
- Tugali parmophoidea Quoy & Gaimard, 1834: synonym of Tugali elegans Gray, 1843
- Tugali plana (Schepman, 1908): synonym of Tugalina plana (Schepman)
- Tugali radiata (Habe, T., 1953): synonym of Tugalina radiata Habe, 1953
- Tugali tasmanica Tenison-Woods, J.E., 1877: synonym of Tugali parmophoidea Quoy & Gaimard, 1834
- Tugali vadososinuata (Yokoyama, M., 1922): synonym of Tugalina vadososinuata (Yokoyama, 1922)
