= Tugali colvillensis =

Scientific classification
- Kingdom: Animalia
- Phylum: Mollusca
- Class: Gastropoda
- Subclass: Vetigastropoda
- Order: Lepetellida
- Family: Fissurellidae
- Genus: Tugali
- Species: T. colvillensis

Binomial name
- Tugali colvillensis Finlay, 1927

Species of gastropod

Tugali colvillensis is a species of small sea snail or limpet, a marine gastropod mollusc in the family Fissurellidae, the keyhole limpets and slit limpets.
