= Tugali barnardi =

Scientific classification
- Kingdom: Animalia
- Phylum: Mollusca
- Class: Gastropoda
- Subclass: Vetigastropoda
- Order: Lepetellida
- Family: Fissurellidae
- Subfamily: Emarginulinae
- Genus: Tugali
- Species: T. barnardi

Binomial name
- Tugali barnardi (Tomlin, 1932)

Synonyms
- Parmaphorella barnardi Tomlin, 1932

Species of gastropod

Tugali barnardi is a species of sea snail, a marine gastropod mollusk in the family Fissurellidae, the keyhole limpets and slit limpets.
