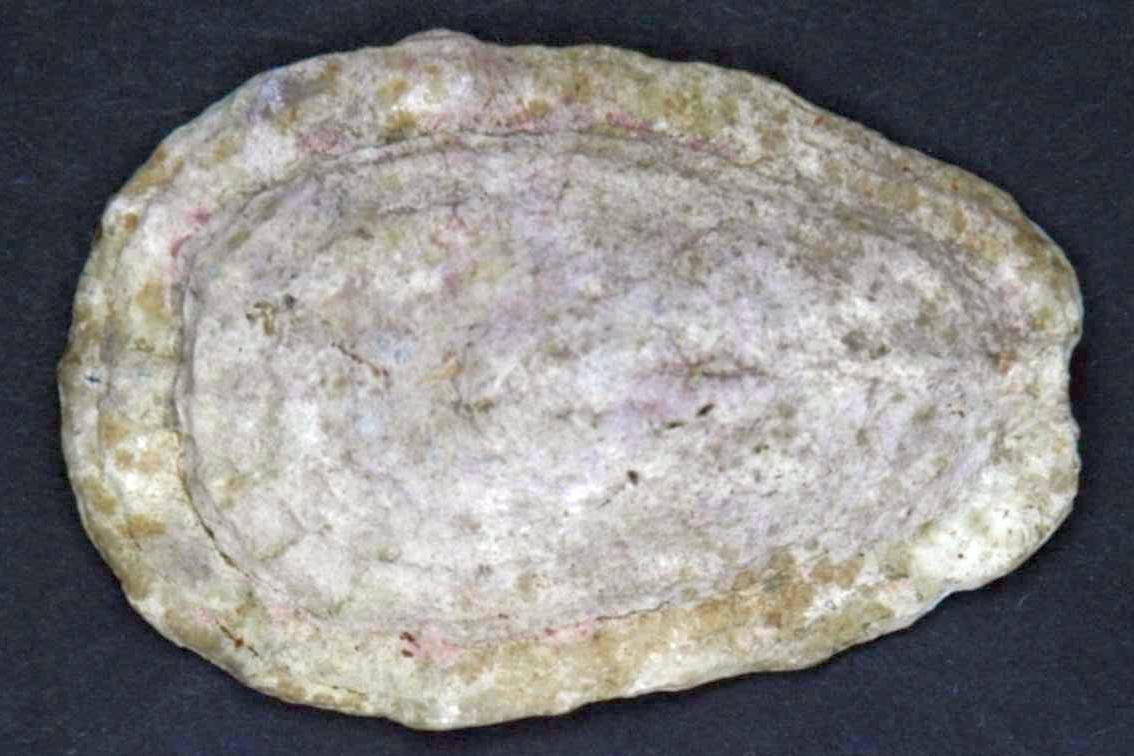
- Tugalina gigas

Scientific classification
- Kingdom: Animalia
- Phylum: Mollusca
- Class: Gastropoda
- Subclass: Vetigastropoda
- Order: Lepetellida
- Superfamily: Fissurelloidea
- Family: Fissurellidae
- Subfamily: Emarginulinae
- Genus: Tugalina; Habe, 1953

Type species
- Tugalina radiata Habe, 1953

Synonyms
- Tugali (Tugalina) Habe, 1953

= Tugalina =

Genus of gastropods

Tugalina is a genus of sea snails, marine gastropod mollusks in the family Fissurellidae, the keyhole limpets and slit limpets.

== Species ==
Species within the genus Tugalina include:

- Tugalina gigas (Martens, 1881)
- Tugalina plana (Schepman, 1908)
- Tugalina radiata Habe, 1953
- Tugalina vadososinuata (Yokoyama, 1922)
