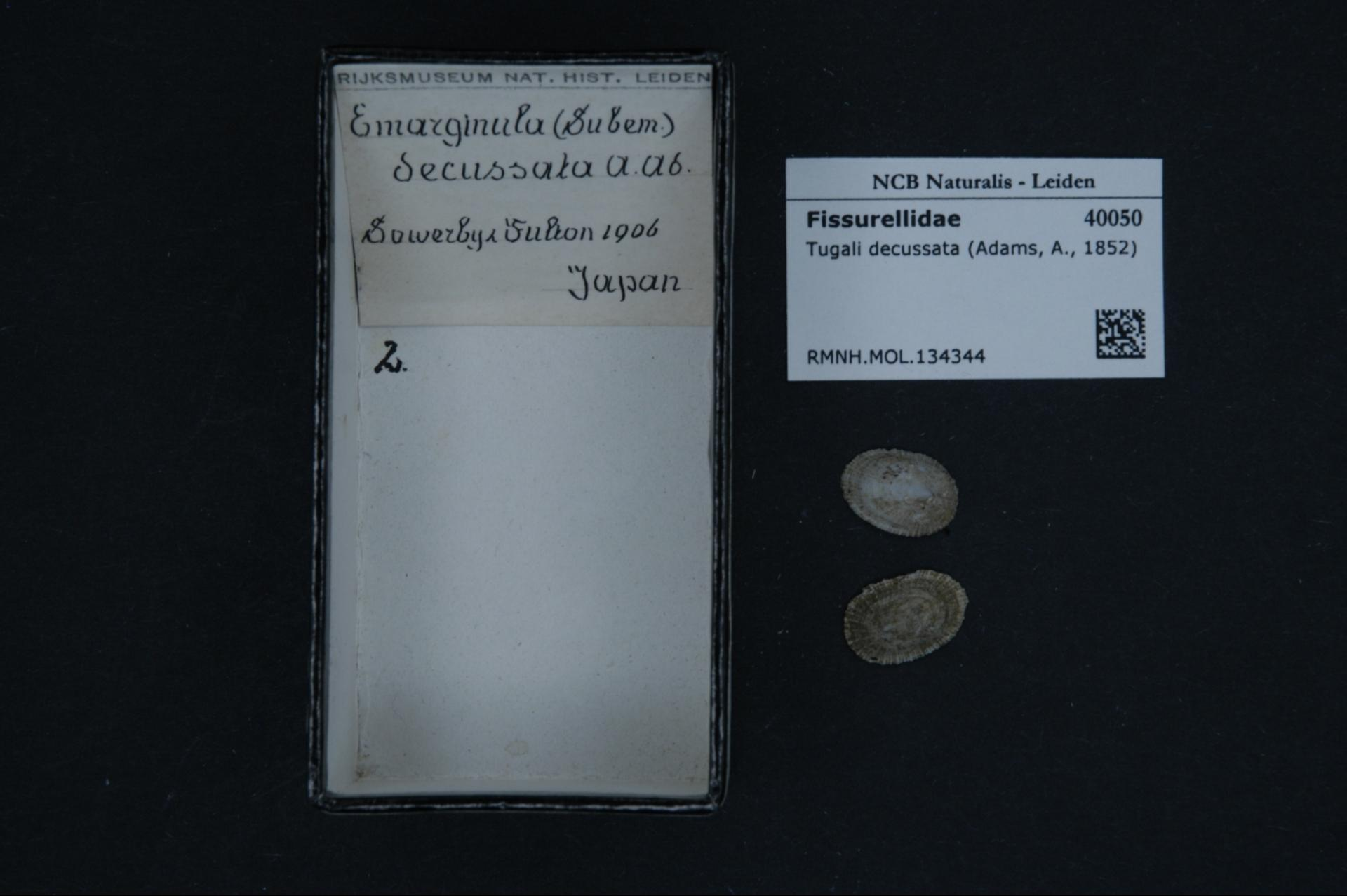
- Preserved Specimen - Tugali decussata (Adams, 1852)

Scientific classification
- Kingdom: Animalia
- Phylum: Mollusca
- Class: Gastropoda
- Subclass: Vetigastropoda
- Order: Lepetellida
- Family: Fissurellidae
- Subfamily: Emarginulinae
- Genus: Tugali
- Species: T. decussata

Binomial name
- Tugali decussata Adams, 1852

Synonyms
- Emarginula angustata Thiele, 1915

= Tugali decussata =

Species of gastropod

Tugali decussata is a species of sea snail, a marine gastropod mollusk in the family Fissurellidae, the keyhole limpets and slit limpets.
