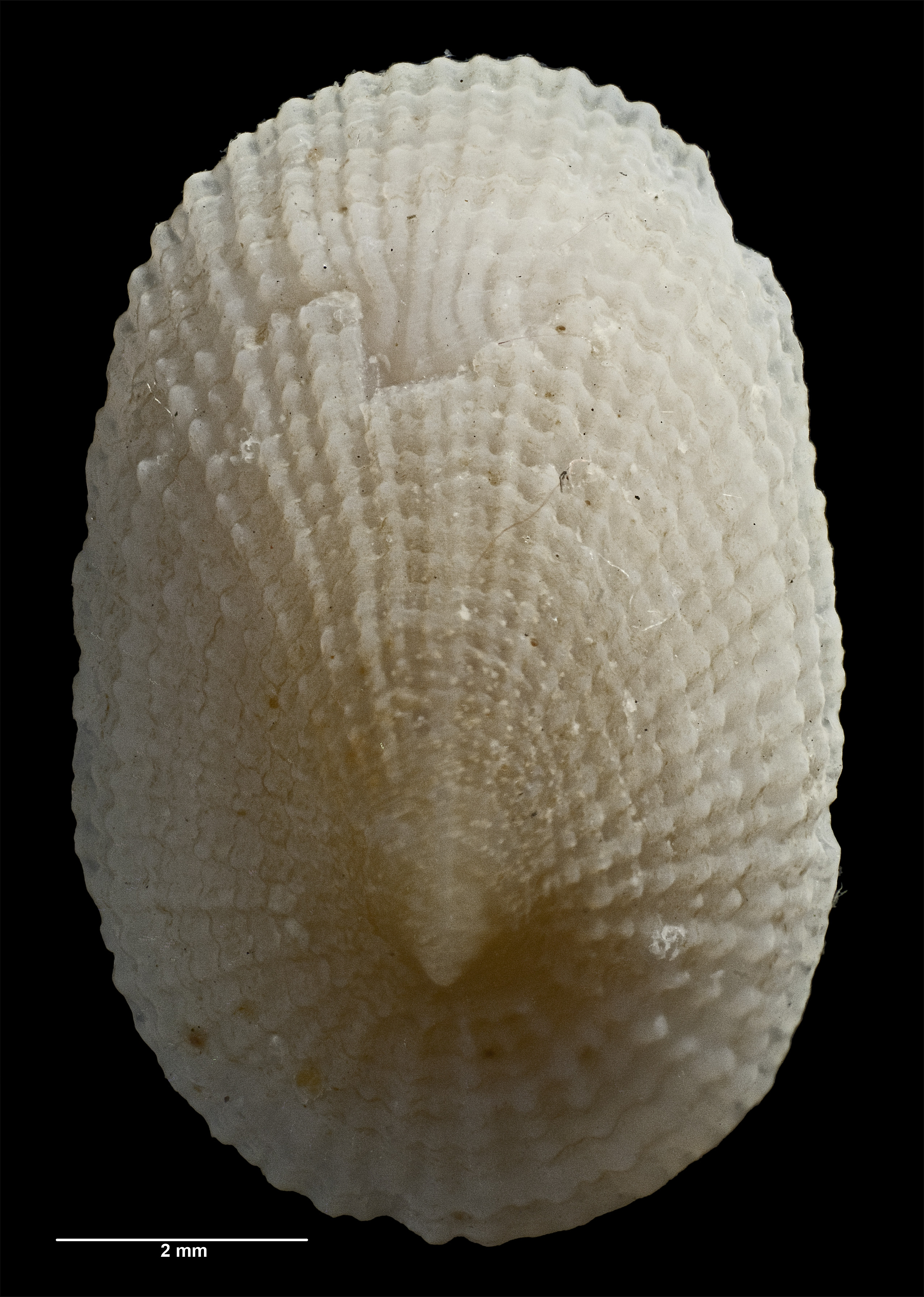
- Shell of Tugali suteri suteri (speciimen at the Auckland War Memorial Museum)

Scientific classification
- Kingdom: Animalia
- Phylum: Mollusca
- Class: Gastropoda
- Subclass: Vetigastropoda
- Order: Lepetellida
- Family: Fissurellidae
- Genus: Tugali
- Species: T. suteri

Binomial name
- Tugali suteri (Thiele, 1916)

Synonyms
- Emarginula (Tugali) suteri Thiele, 1916; Emarginula suteri Thiele, 1916 (original combination); Tugali suteri suteri (Thiele, 1916)· accepted, alternate representation; Tugalia bascauda Hedley, 1917

= Tugali suteri =

Species of gastropod

Tugali suteri is a species of small sea snail or limpet, a marine gastropod mollusc in the Family Fissurellidae, the keyhole limpets and slit limpets.

A subspecies of this limpet is Tugali suteri sutherlandi.
