= Tugali scutellaris =

Scientific classification
- Kingdom: Animalia
- Phylum: Mollusca
- Class: Gastropoda
- Subclass: Vetigastropoda
- Order: Lepetellida
- Family: Fissurellidae
- Subfamily: Emarginulinae
- Genus: Tugali
- Species: T. scutellaris

Binomial name
- Tugali scutellaris Adams, 1852

Species of gastropod

Tugali scutellaris is a species of sea snail, a marine gastropod mollusk in the family Fissurellidae, the keyhole limpets and slit limpets.

== Description ==
Shell size 11 mm.

== Distribution ==
Queensland, Australia.
