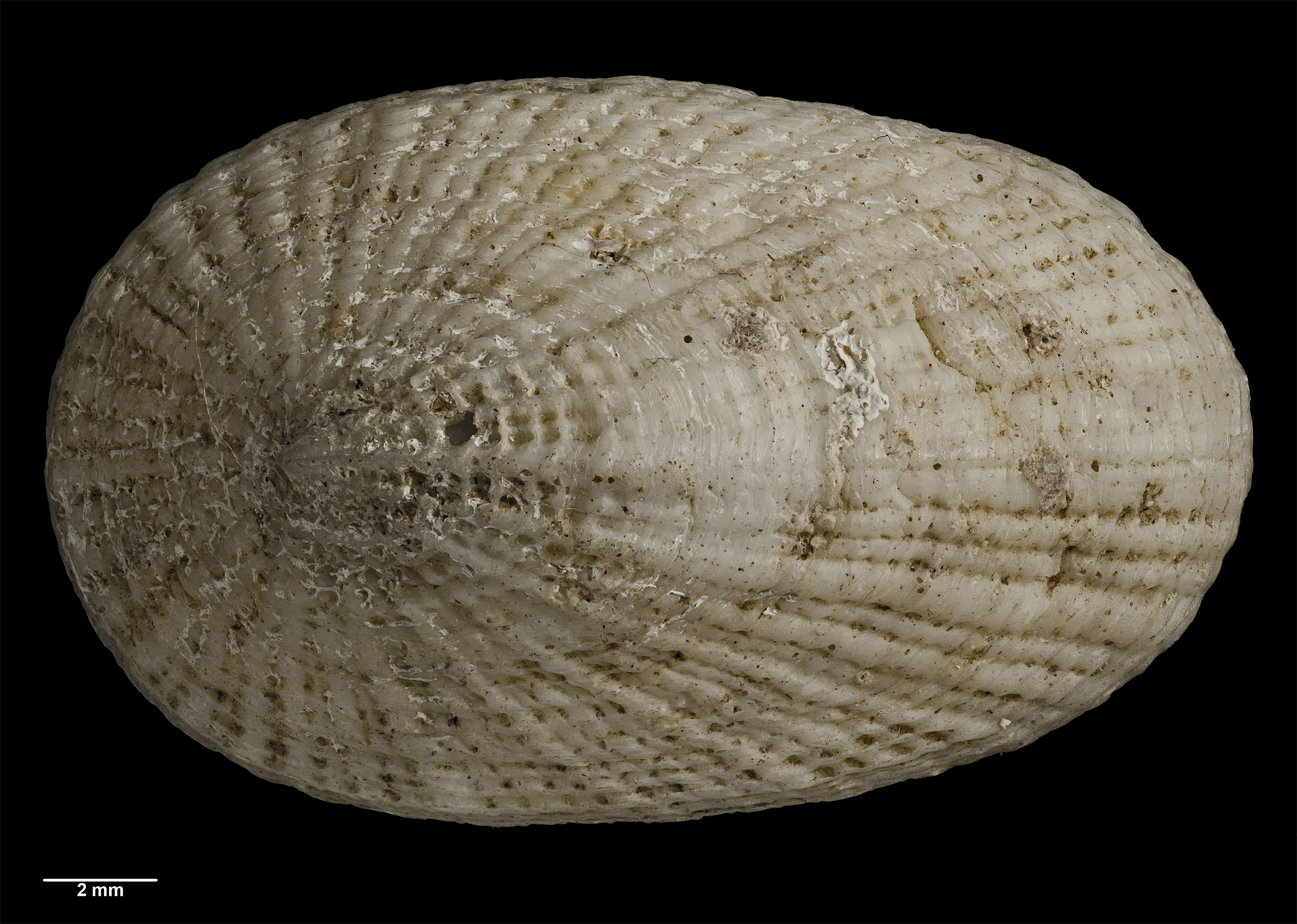
- Holotype from the Auckland War Memorial Museum

Scientific classification
- Kingdom: Animalia
- Phylum: Mollusca
- Class: Gastropoda
- Subclass: Vetigastropoda
- Order: Lepetellida
- Family: Fissurellidae
- Genus: Tugali
- Species: T. stewartiana

Binomial name
- Tugali stewartiana Powell, 1939

= Tugali stewartiana =

Species of gastropod

Tugali stewartiana is a species of medium-sized sea snail or limpet, a marine gastropod mollusc in the Family Fissurellidae, the keyhole limpets and slit limpets.
