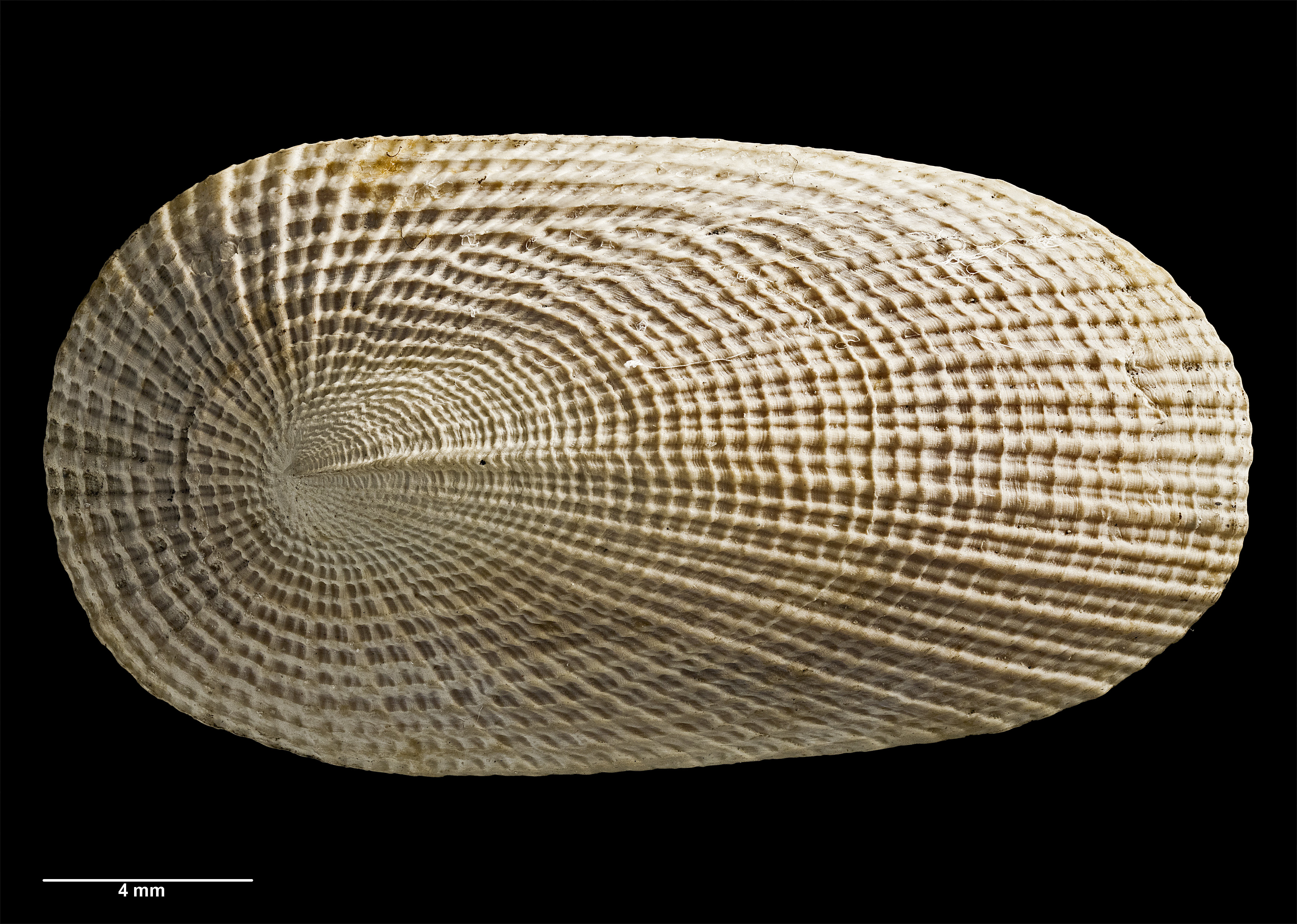
- Holotype from Auckland War Memorial Museum

Scientific classification
- Kingdom: Animalia
- Phylum: Mollusca
- Class: Gastropoda
- Subclass: Vetigastropoda
- Order: Lepetellida
- Family: Fissurellidae
- Genus: Tugali
- Species: †T. superba

Binomial name
- †Tugali superba A. W. B. Powell, 1934

= Tugali superba =

Tugali superba Temporal range: Late Pleistocene

Extinct species of gastropod

Tugali superba is an extinct species of sea snail, a marine gastropod mollusc, in the family Fissurellidae, the keyhole limpets and slit limpets. Fossils of the species date to the Late Pleistocene, and occur in the strata of Te Piki in the eastern Bay of Plenty, New Zealand.

== Description ==
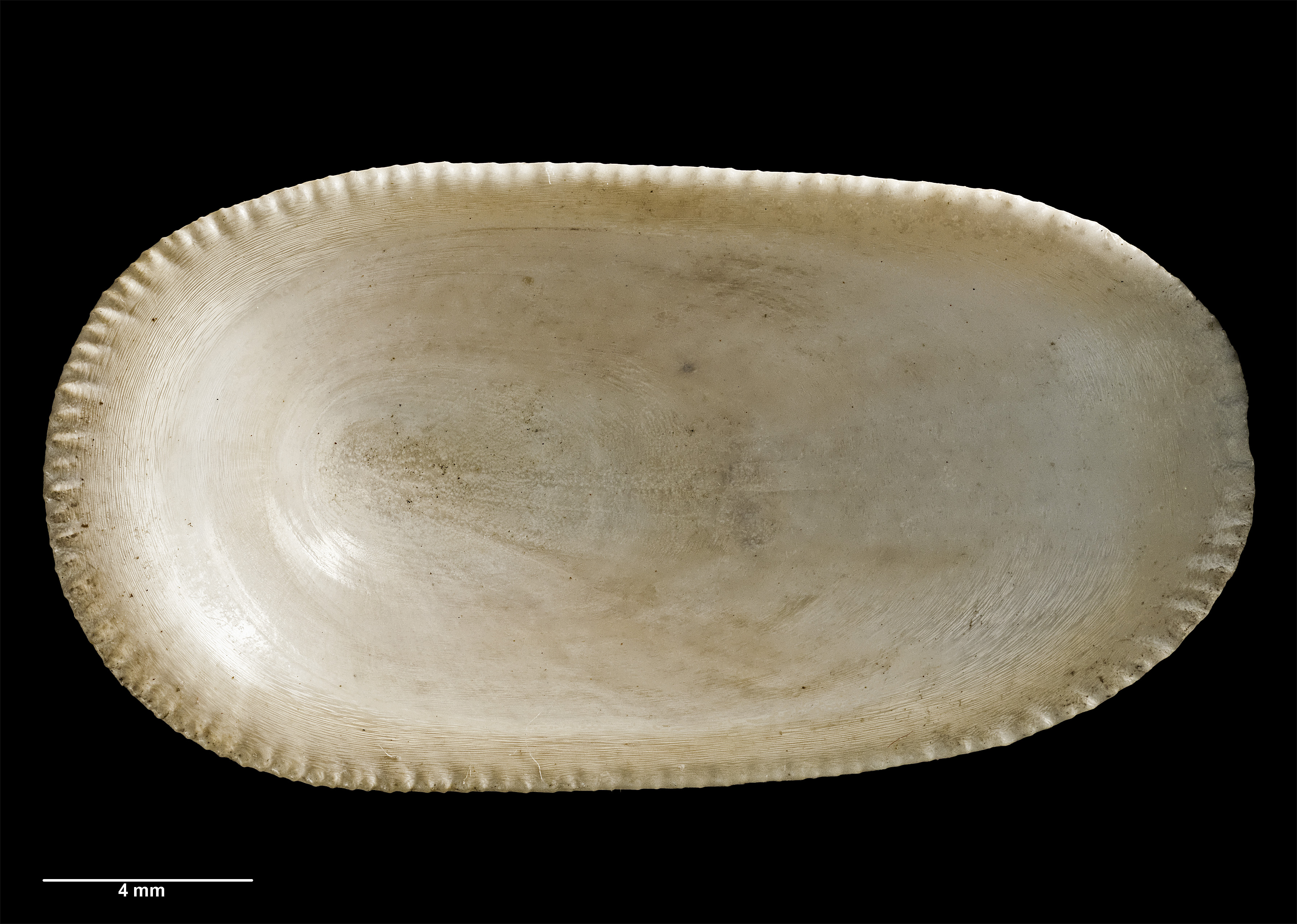
Underside view of holotype

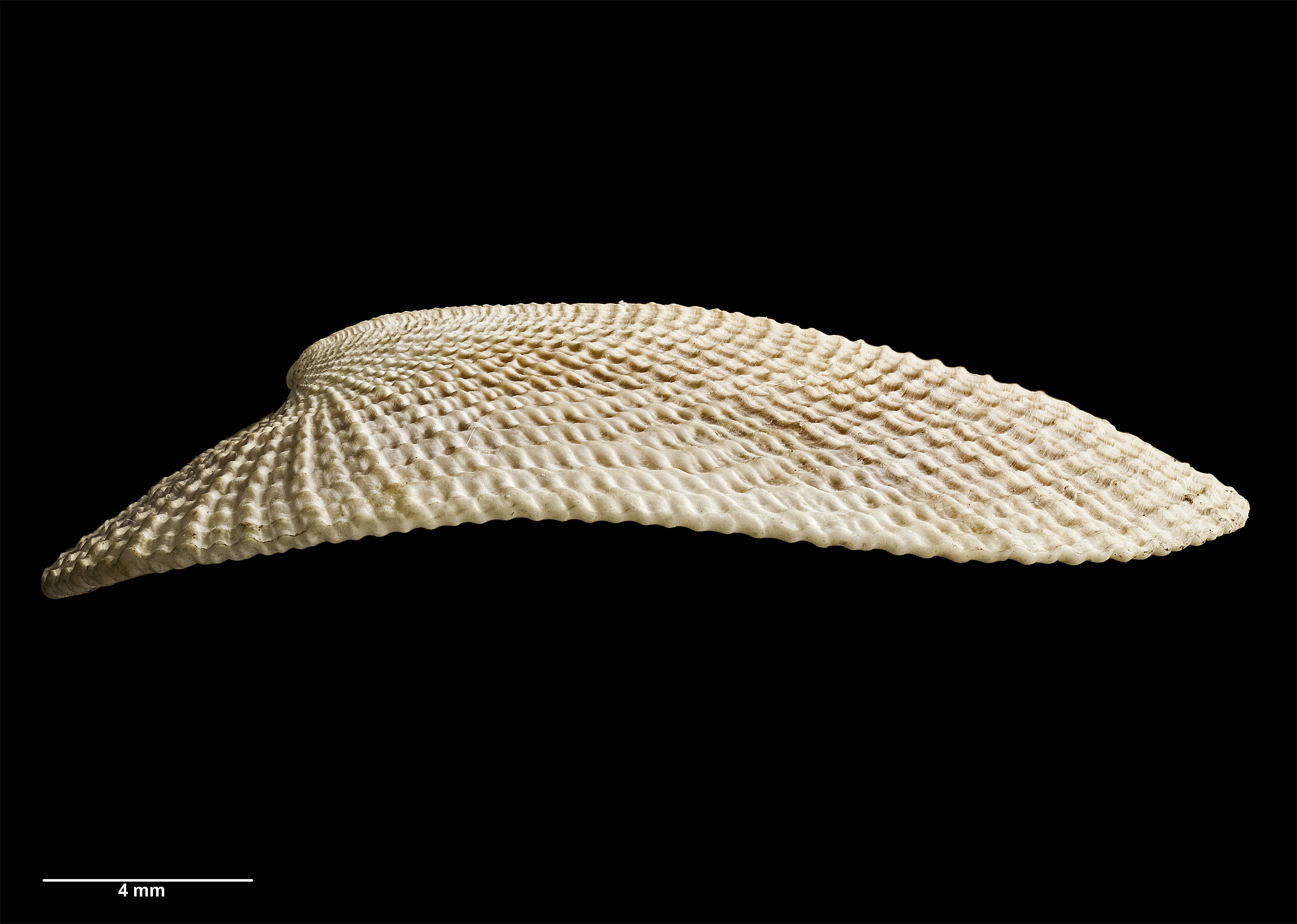
Side view of holotype

In the original description, Powell described the species as follows:

Shell moderately large, depressed, oblong, not noticeably narrowed in front. Sculptured with a fairly open, crisp reticulation of radial and concentric ribs. Sinus rib distinctly tricarinate, which places the species in the elegans—pliocenica—opuraensis—navicula series, although with its rectangular outline the shell simulates the shape of the bascauda, bicarinate-ribbed series. Apex at the posterior fifth, low. Sides parallel, broadly rounded at both ends, but very slightly narrowed anteriorly. Radial sculpture at the margin consists of about 88 regularly alternating crisp rounded radials, of which 51 are primaries. The radials are crossed by slightly finer crisp, concentric ridges, which enclose rectangular interspaces that are considerably longer than wide. Interior smooth and polished, margins crenulated, corresponding to the external ribbing.

The holotype of the species measures 23 mm (0.91 in) in length, 12.25 mm (0.482 in) in width, and 5.25 mm (0.207 in) in height. The species can be identified due to its very depressed shape, very slight anterior narrowing, and due to having crisp ribbing and more open interstices.

The species has microscopic growth lines, spiral striae, and numerous, fine, subperipheral spirals, which were not noted by Powell. Powell felt that Tibersyrnola semiconcava was closely related to the species, but differs due to lower and broader whorl proportions in T. tepikiensis.

== Taxonomy ==
The species was first described by A.W.B. Powell in 1934. The holotype was collected by Powell in August 1933 from 6 km (3.7 mi) east of Cape Runaway in the Bay of Plenty Region, and is held by the Auckland War Memorial Museum.

== Distribution ==
This extinct marine species dates to the Late Pleistocene (Haweran), and is only known to occur in the strata of the Waipaoa Formation (Te Piki Member), in the eastern Bay of Plenty, New Zealand.
