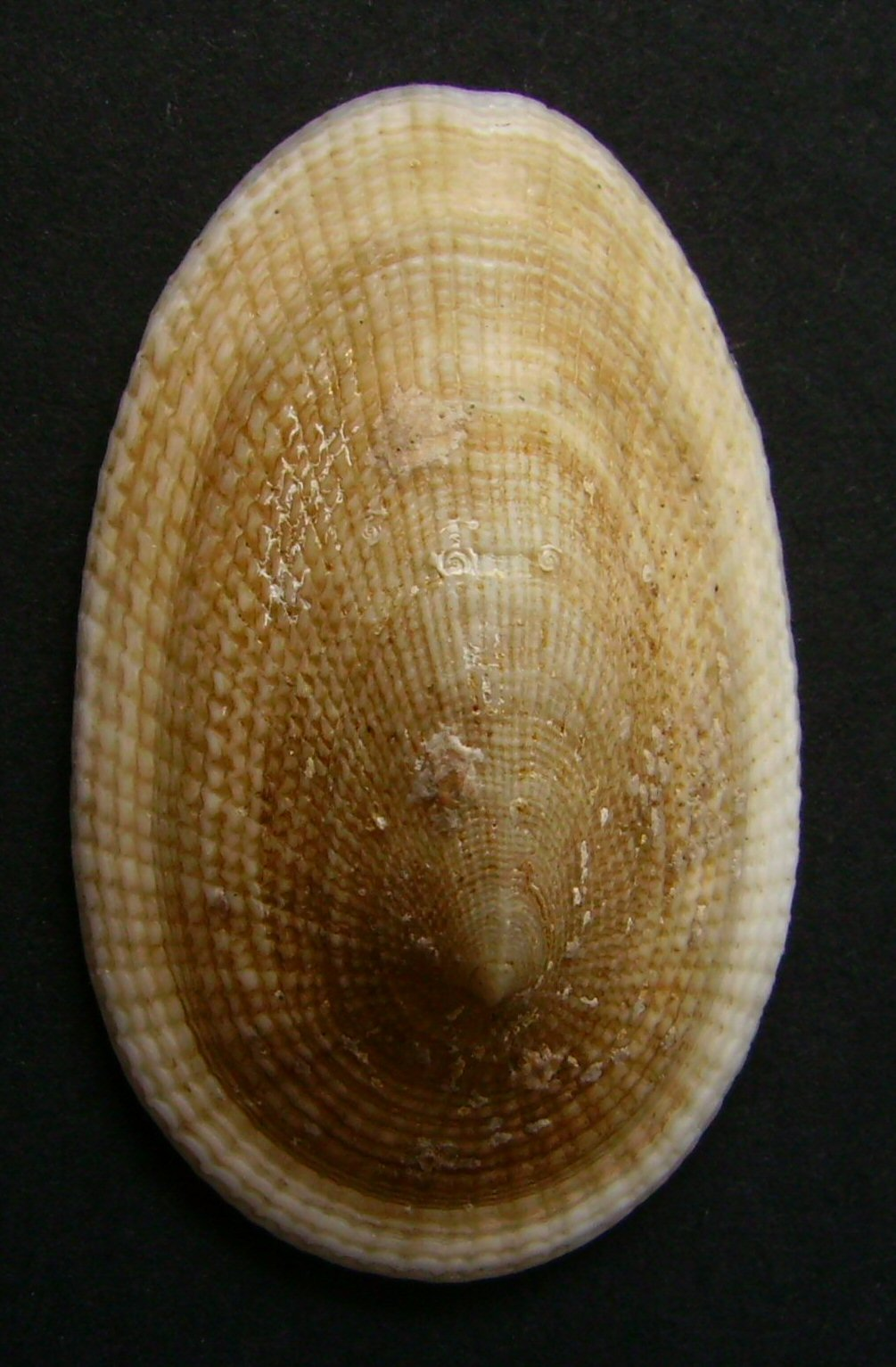
- Dorsal view of a shell of Tugali elegans, from Langs Beach, New Zealand
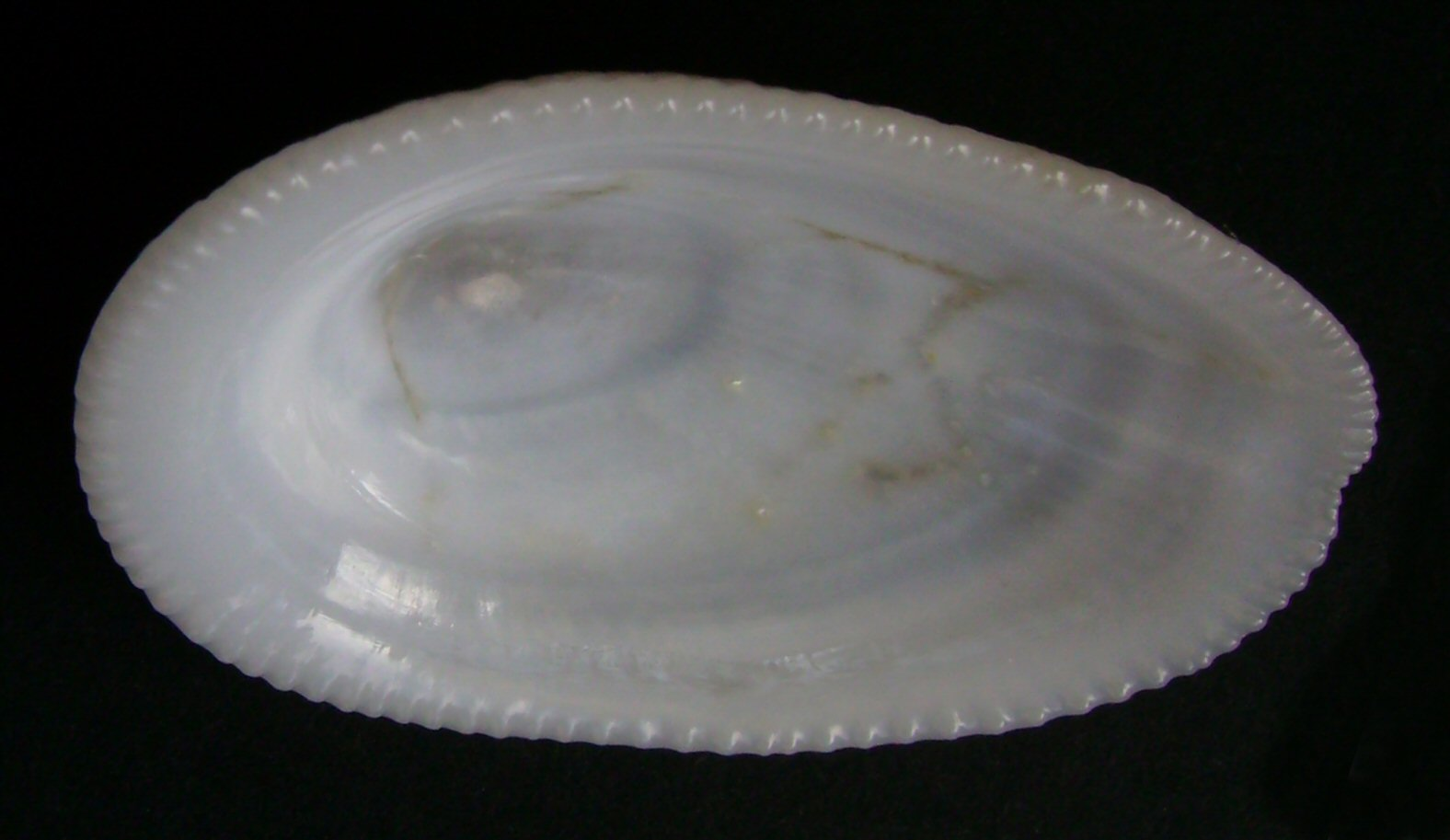
- Internal view of the same shell

Scientific classification
- Kingdom: Animalia
- Phylum: Mollusca
- Class: Gastropoda
- Subclass: Vetigastropoda
- Order: Lepetellida
- Family: Fissurellidae
- Genus: Tugali
- Species: T. elegans

Binomial name
- Tugali elegans Gray, 1843

Synonyms
- Emarginula parmophoidea Quoy & Gaimard, 1834; Tugali parmophoidea Quoy & Gaimard, 1834

= Tugali elegans =

Species of gastropod

Tugali elegans is a species of large sea snail or limpet, a marine gastropod mollusc in the Family Fissurellidae, the keyhole limpets and slit limpets.
