= Tugalina plana =

Scientific classification
- Kingdom: Animalia
- Phylum: Mollusca
- Class: Gastropoda
- Subclass: Vetigastropoda
- Order: Lepetellida
- Family: Fissurellidae
- Subfamily: Emarginulinae
- Genus: Tugalina
- Species: T. plana

Binomial name
- Tugalina plana (Schepman, 1908)

Synonyms
- Subemarginula plana Schepman, 1908

Species of gastropod

Tugalina plana is a species of sea snail, a marine gastropod mollusk in the family Fissurellidae, the keyhole limpets and slit limpets.
