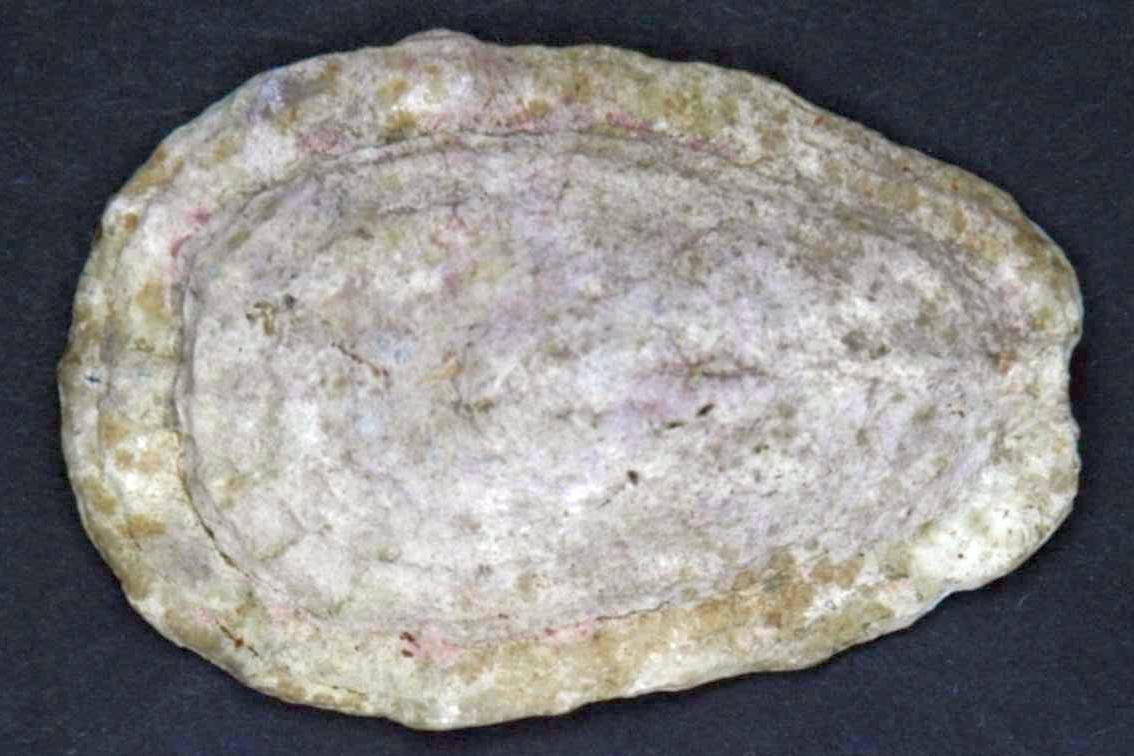

Scientific classification
- Kingdom: Animalia
- Phylum: Mollusca
- Class: Gastropoda
- Subclass: Vetigastropoda
- Order: Lepetellida
- Family: Fissurellidae
- Subfamily: Emarginulinae
- Genus: Tugalina
- Species: T. gigas

Binomial name
- Tugalina gigas (Martens, 1881)

Synonyms
- Scelidotoma gigas (Martens, 1881); Subemarginula gigas Martens, 1881; Tugali (Tugalina) gigas (Martens, 1881) · unaccepted (unaccepted combination); Tugali gigas (Martens, 1881) · unaccepted; Tugalia gigas Martens, 1881

= Tugalina gigas =

Species of gastropod

Tugalina gigas is a species of sea snail, a marine gastropod mollusk in the family Fissurellidae, the keyhole limpets and slit limpets.

== Habitat ==
This species is found in the following habitats:

- Brackish
- Marine
